= Antvorskov County =

Former Danish county

Antvorskov County (Danish: Antvorskov Amt) was a county on the southwestern part of Zealand, Denmark.

== History ==
Antvorskov County was created in 1662 as a replacement of the old Antvorskov Fief (Antvorskov Len). The county consisted of two hundreds, Vester Flakkebjerg Herred and Øster Flakkebjerg Herred. At the 1793 Danish County Reform, with effect from 1798, Antvorskov County, Ringsted County and Korsør County were merged into Sorø County.

== List of county governors ==
Portrait	Name	Term
	Hugo Lützow	1656–1693
	Hans von Bøfke	1693–1694
	Claus Henrik Vieregg	1694–1703
	Christian Vind	1704–1712
	Johan Frederik Thillemann	1712–1713
	Ernst Gottschalck Bülow	1713–1716
	Heinrich Leopold von Schindel	1716–1723
	Simon Henrik von Donop	1723–1727
	Frederik Rostgaard	1727–1730
	Christian Hans von Warnstedt	1730–1734
	Christen Borregaard	1734–1741
	Villum Berregaard	1741–1751
	Frederik de Løvenørn	1751–1779
	Wolf Veit Christoph von Reitzenstein (acting)	1773–1780
	Carl Adolf Raben	1780–1781
	Esajas Fleischer	1781–1785
	Vilhelm Mathias Skeel	1785–1798
	Poul Christian Stemann	1798–1803
