= Ringsted County =

Former Danish county

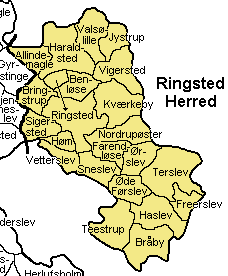
Ringsted County.

Ringsted County (Danish: Sorø Amt) was a Danish county on central Zealand. The largest town was Ringsted.

== History ==
Ringsted County was created in 1662 as a replacement of the old Ringsted Fief (Ringsted Len). The county consisted of a single hundred (Ringsted Herred). Beginning in 1748, Ringsted County was administrated together with Sorø County. At the 1793 Danish County Reform, with effect from 1798, Ringsted County, Korsør County, and Antvorskov County were merged into Sorø County.

== List of county governors of Sorø ==
The governors of Ringsted County (Danish: Amtmænd, singular Amtmand) from 1653 until its dissolution in 1798, were:

Portrait	Name	Term	Notes
	Jørgen Christoffersen Seefeld	1630—1662	
	Henning Pogwisch	1662—1664	
	Jørgen Recdtz	1664—1671	
	Hugo Lützow	1671—1680	
	Adam Ehrenreich von Prehn	1680—1684	
	Frederik Gabel	1684—1691	
	Frederik Giese	1692—1693	
	Frederik Gabel	1693—1694	2nd term
	Poul (Hals) Moth	1694—1'700	
	Johan Diderik Grüner	1700—1712	
	Jacob Frants von der Osten	1712—1734	
	Tomas Lillienskjold	1734—1748	
	Christoph Ernst von Beulwitz	1743—1745	
	Heinrich von Reuss	1745—1754	
	Carl Juel	1754—1760	
	Frederik Danneskiold-Samsøe	1760—1764	
	Wolf Veit Christoph von Reitzenstein	1764—1781	
	Carl Adolph Raben	1781—1784	
	Gregers Christian Haxthausen	1784—1787	
	Vilhelm Mathias Skeel	1787–1798	
