= Frederik Giese =

Danish civil servant, county governor and landowner

Frederik Giese (15 June 1625 – 12 February 1693) was a German-Danish court official, county governor and landowner. He established the manor of Giesegaard near Ringsted.

== Early life and education ==
Giese was born on 15 June 1625 in Husom, the son of town scribe and local councilman Joachim Giese (died 1645) and Salome Moldenit (died 1669). In 1639, he was sent to the chancellery at Gottorp Castle where he worked for the local administration for four years under Eilhard Schacht.

== Career ==
In 1644, he was sent to Copenhagen with a recommendation to rigsmarsk Anders Bille from county governor of Rendsburg Christian Rantzau (1614–1663). His first employment in the Danish central administration was as Secretary of War. In 1647, he was appointed military prosecutor (auditør) in Jutland. In 1652, he was sent on a four-year journey abroad as Hofmeister for Henrik Bille on his Grand Tour to France, Italy Germany, England and the Netherlands. This gave him the opportunity to study at the universities in Tübingen (1652) and Padua (1656). In 1657, Frederick III appointed him chief military prosecutor (generalauditør). In 1659, he was sent to Norway.In November 1660 (with effect from February 1661), he was appointed chamber secretary in the new Skatkammerkollegium. In June 1670, he was promoted to assessor. In December 1679, he was transferred to the new Rentekammerkollegium. In May 1682, he was appointed Admiralty Councillor (Admiralitetsråd). In 1684. he was appointed kommerceråd.

In 1692, when C.S. von Plessen took over the management of Rentekammeret in 1692, Giese was removed from the central administration. He was instead appointed county governor of Ringsted.

== Property ==
In the 1660s, Giese received land in Koldinghus County. In 1668, he returned it to the crown in exchange for land in Nordrup Åarish, Ringsted. He was later able to expand it with more land, partly acquired from the crown and partly from private landowners. In 1683, he was able to establish the manor of Giesegaard.

== Personal life ==
On 18 December 1665, Giese married to Margaretha Elisabeth Schönbach (died c. 1719). She was the daughter of Johann Christoph Schönbach (1616–1683) and Susanne Elisabeth Lange (1621–1673). After Giese's death, Giesegaard passed to his wife and his son, Christoffer Joachim Giese. It was sold in 1719.

Civic offices
Preceded by Frederik Gabel	County Governor of Ringsted Amt; 1692—1693	Succeeded by Frederik Gabel
