= Wolf Veit Christoph von Reitzenstein =

Danish county governor and headmaster

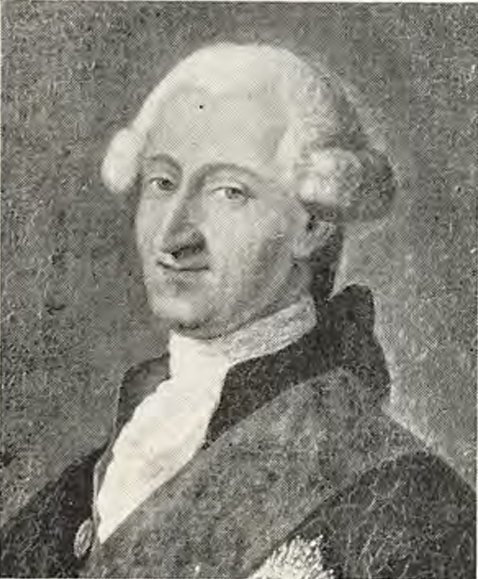
Veit Christof von Reitzenstein.

Wolf Veit Christoph von Reitzenstein (30 November 1710 – 25 December 1781) was a Danish county governor and headmaster of Sorø Academy.

== Early life and education ==
Reitzenstein was born on 30 November 1710 in Lichtenberg am der Selbnitz, the son of Wolf Christoph von Reitzenstein (1663–1729) and Maria Sabina v. Würtzburg (born 1683). He came to Denmark at an early age.

== Career ==
In 1734, Reitzenstein became an army officer. In 1736, he became a page (kammerjunker) at queen Sophie Magdalene's court. In 1747, he was promoted to court marshall and jægermester. In 1756, he was appointed county governor of Segeberg County. In 1757, he returned to Zealand as county governor of Vordingborg and Tryggevælde. In 1766, he was appointed county governor of Sorø and Ringsted. At the same time, he was appointed headmaster of Sorø Academy. In 1779–1780, he also served as acting county governor of Korsør and Antvorskov counties.

In 1759, he was awarded the title of gehejmeråd. In 1769, he was awarded the title of gehejme-konferensråd. He became a White Knight in 1760 and a Vlue Knight in 1777.

== Personal life ==
On 11 April 1755, Reitzenstein married Øllegaard von Gramm (1735–1759). She was a daughter of overjægermester Carl Christian von Gramm (1703–80) and Birgitte C. Friis (1715–75). After the death of his first wife, he married the gofdame to the queen dowager, Theresia Sophie von Zedwitz (1713-1799).

Civic offices
Preceded by Hannibal Wedell	County Governor of Tryggevælde Amt; 1757–1766	Succeeded by Christian Ditlev Rantzau
Preceded by Hannibal Wedell	County Governor of Vordingborg Amt; 1757—1766	Succeeded by Christian Ditlev Rantzau
Preceded by Frederik Danneskiold-Samsøe	County Governor of Ringste Amt; 1766—1781	Succeeded by Frederik Danneskiold-Samsøe
Preceded by Veit Christof von Reitzenstein	County Governor of Sorø Amt; 1766—1781	Succeeded by Carl Adolph Raben
Preceded by Frederik de Løvenørn	County Governor of Antvorskov Amt; 1779—1780	Succeeded by Carl Adolph Raben
Preceded by Frederik de Løvenørn	County Governor of Korsør Amt; 1779—1780	Succeeded by Carl Adolph Raben
