= Frederik Krag =

Danish nobleman (Baron) and senior civil servant

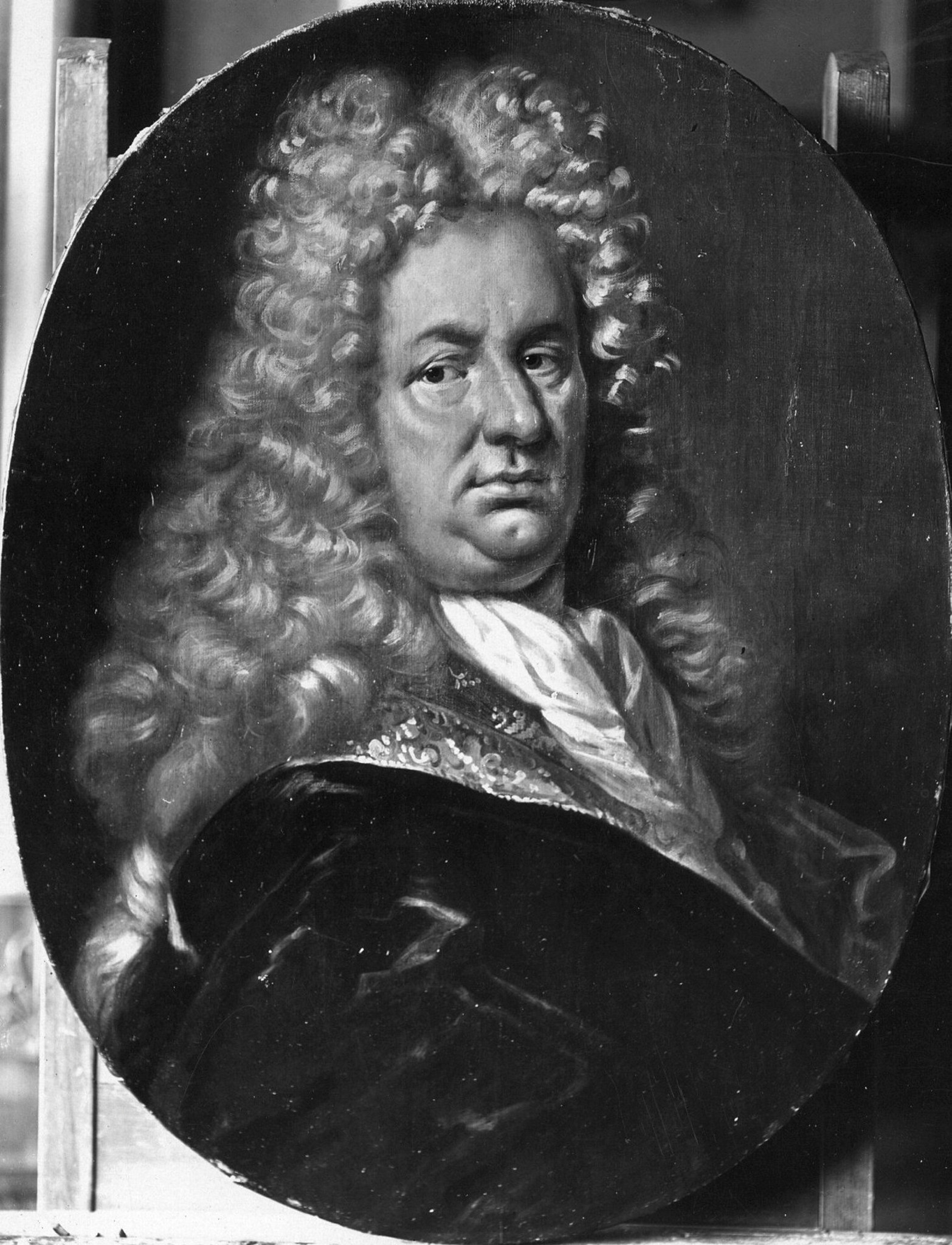

Governor-general of Norway
- In office 19 September 1713 – 1722
- Preceded by: Claus Henrik Vieregg
- Succeeded by: Ditlev Vibe

Personal details
- Born: 6 March 1655 Flensborg, Slesvig-Holsten
- Died: 24 September 1728 (aged 73) Stensballegård, Horsens, Denmark
- Awards: Order of the Dannebrog

Frederik Krag (6 March 1655 – 24 September 1728) was a Danish nobleman (Baron) and senior civil servant who served kings Frederick IV and Frederick V. He was the Governor-General of Norway, from 1713 until 1722. He is not fondly remembered in Norway due to his attempts to subordinate the farmers there in a similar level of service to that which was common in Denmark of the period.

== Early life ==
He was born in Flensburg, Schleswig, Denmark (now Schleswig-Holstein, Germany). His father, Erik Krag (1620–72), served as Supreme Secretary of the Danish chancery and his mother, Vibeke Pallesdatter Rosenkrantz (died in 1708) was of the Danish-noble Rosenkrantz line dating back to Knight Neils Rosenkrantz in 1341.

== Civil service ==
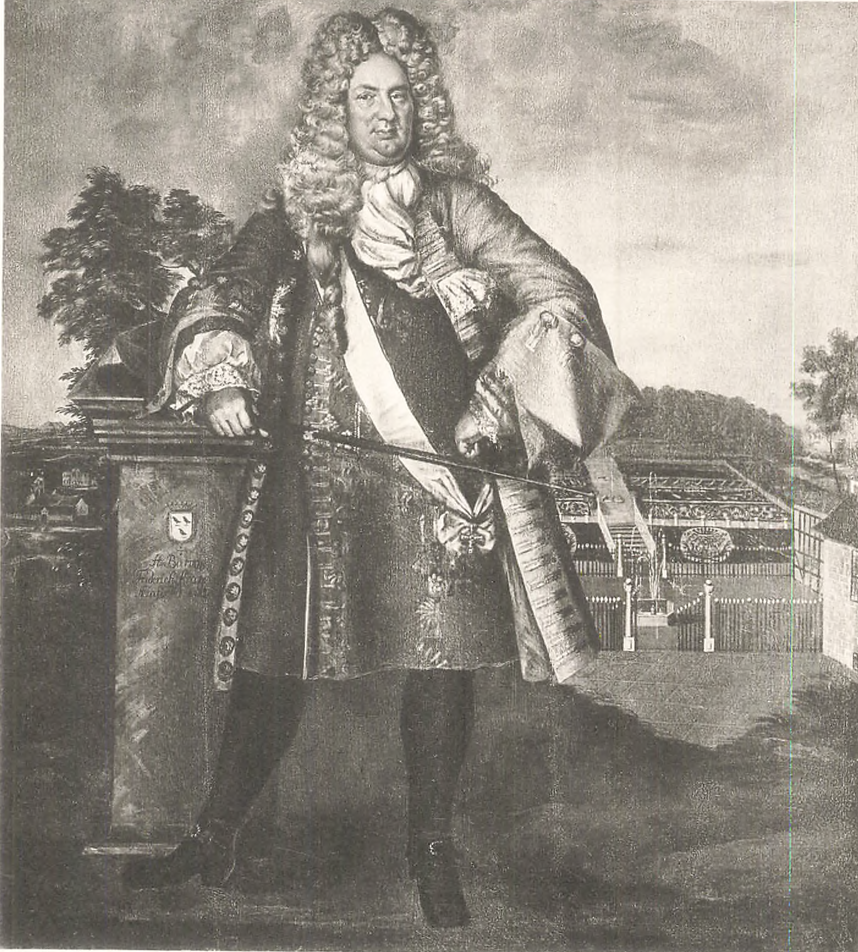
Frederik Krag.

Frederik Krag began his government service by serving from 1675 through 1678 with the Danish delegation in Paris and later in Nijmegen for the negotiations among the European powers that aimed to put an end to the constant warfare that had ravaged the continent for years. The result was the Treaty of Nijmegen signed in 1678, which failed to provide for a lasting peace.

Upon returning to Copenhagen he attended the Danish queen for several years (as a Kammerjunker), rising to master of ceremonies. It was during this period that he married Baroness Juel.

In 1684 he proceeded to the Dutch Republic, remaining there as ambassador until 1688. Frederik Krag was named a Knight of the Order of the Dannebrog, in 1708, and in 1712 he was elevated to counselor of the Danish realm (geheimeråd).

He became governor of the Diocese of Viborg and was the magistrate in Hald municipality from 1695 to 1713. He served as Governor-General of Norway from 1713 until 1722. He became Governor-General as successor to Claus Henrik Vieregg (1655–1713) who had died in office.

== Family ==
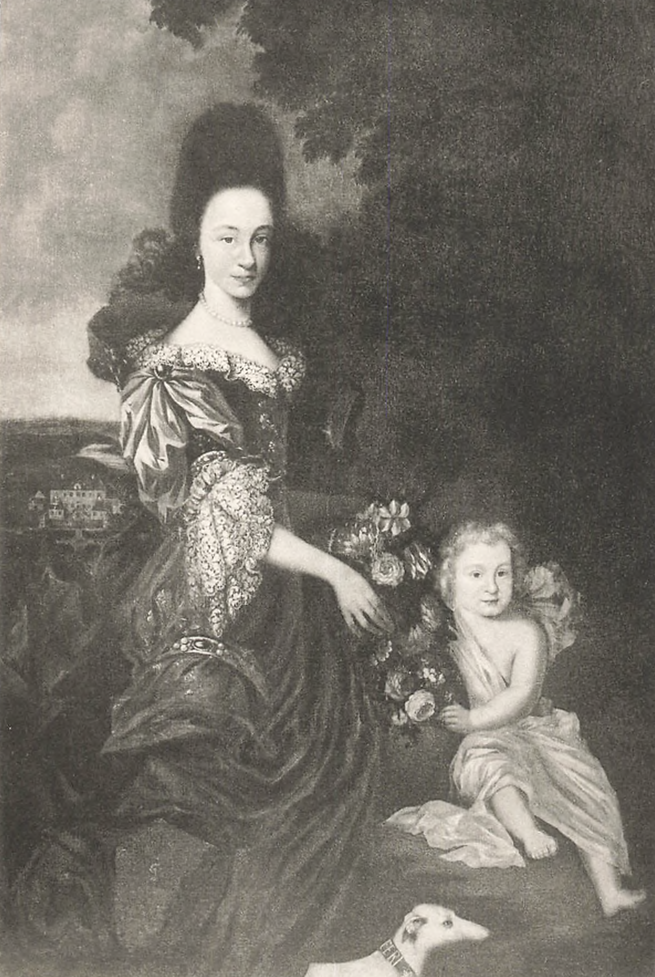
Charlotte Amalie Krag with one of her children.

Frederik Krag was married three times to women from noble families. He was first married in 1683 to Baroness Hedevig Eleonore Juell (1662–1686), the daughter of Baron Jens Juel (1631–1700) and Vibeke Ottesdatter Skeel.

His second marriage in November 1690 was with Charlotte Amalie Griffenfeld (1672–1703), the daughter of the Lord Chancellor, Count Peder Griffenfeld (1635–1699) and Karen Nansen (1656–1672). This marriage brought the manor Stensballegård at Vær Sogn in Horsens municipality into the Krag family, where it remained until 1927.

His third marriage was in 1705 to 19-year-old Edele Nielsdatter Krag (1686–1751), daughter of Niels Ottesen Krag and Sophie Nielsdatter Juel.
