= Bygdøy Royal Estate =

Royal Estate from the early 18th century in Oslo, Norway

Coordinates: 59°54′39.73″N 10°40′39.51″E

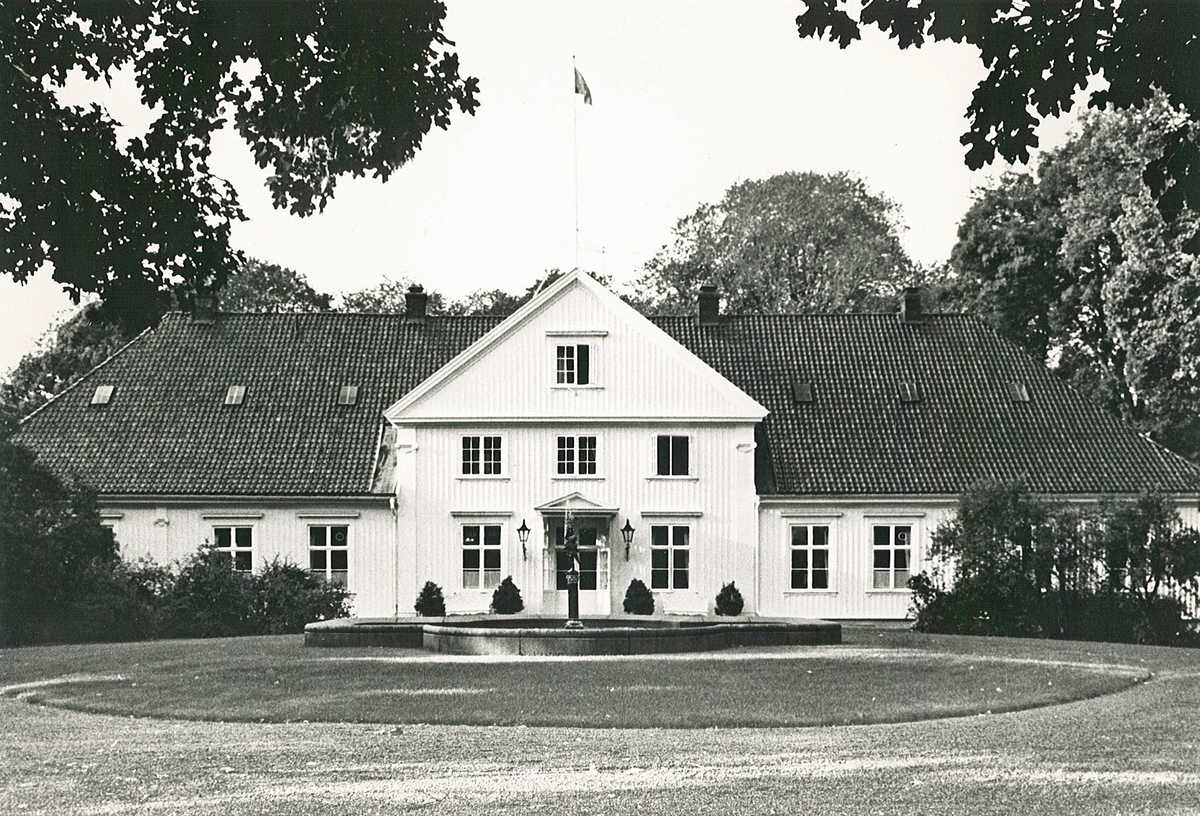
- Black and white photo from the 1980s
- Interactive map of the Bygdøy Royal Estate area

General information
- Architectural style: Baroque
- Location: Oslo, Norway
- Completed: 1733
- Client: Christian Rantzau
- Owner: Haakon VIII

Bygdøy Royal Estate (Norwegian: Bygdøy kongsgård), also known as the Bygdø Royal Farm, is a Kongsgård estate and manor house that occupies a large part of the northwestern part of the Bygdøy peninsula in Oslo, Norway. It is the official summer residence of the king of Norway.

== History ==
=== Middle Ages ===
The estate originally belonged to the Cistercian monastery on Hovedøya. At the end of the thirteenth century, Bygdøy was purchased from the Hovedøya monastery by King Haakon V of Norway as a gift for his wife, Queen Euphemia of Rügen. Their daughter, Ingeborg of Norway, later returned the island to the monastery.

It was acquired by King Christian III of Denmark-Norway. during the Protestant Reformation to supply Akershus Fortress and its garrison. The later kings of Denmark-Norway would also use the estate for hunting and as a hunting lodge. A zoological garden was set up by King Christian IV of Denmark-Norway.

=== Current estate ===
The current main building was erected in 1733 as a summer residence and maison de plaisance for the Governor-general of Norway, Christian Rantzau (1684–1771). King Christian Frederick lived on the estate in 1814 after he was forced to give up the throne and before he left for Denmark. Following the establishment of the Swedish-Norwegian Union, King Charles III purchased the remaining estate grounds from the Norwegian government in 1837.

King Oscar I would later erect the palace Oscarshall close to the estate grounds while his son, King Charles IV, later sold much of the estate back to the government. King Oscar II, the last king of the union, invested considerably in the estate and constructed six villas which functioned as both residences and guest houses (only one of these villas exists today). King Oscar II also established the world's first open-air museum on the estate in the year 1881, a museum which in 1907 was overtaken by the Norwegian Museum of Cultural History.

=== Recent years ===
After the election of King Haakon VII in 1905, the King and Queen Maud lived their first year in Norway at the estate while the Royal Palace in Oslo was refurbished. Queen Maud created new English landscape and rock gardens on the estate grounds with the help of Charles Edward Hubbard. The royal family would later use the estate as a summer residence, a tradition which was continued by King Olav V and later Harald V.

A comprehensive restoration of the main building and gardens began in 2004. The buildings and gardens have undergone extensive refurbishments and the estate is again set to be the regular summer residence of Harald V and Queen Sonja . As a birthday present when the King and Queen turned 70 in the year 2007, the Norwegian government restored a statue of Herman Wedel Jarlsberg, which was erected by King Charles IV and unveiled in 1845, while also restoring the original buildings in the Dronningberget-park which is close to the estate.

== Public accessibility ==
Bygdøy Royal Estate is the largest organic dairy producer in the city of Oslo with a visit yard, riding school, organic food production and horticulture. Jams from fruit grown on the farm are for sale. There is a cafe in the gardener's house every Saturday and Sunday most of the year. Opening hours: Saturday and Sunday 12 noon - 4 pm. The farm buildings except the main building and the royal park, such as the stable and the barn are open to the public every Saturday from March to June and August to October.

== Gallery ==
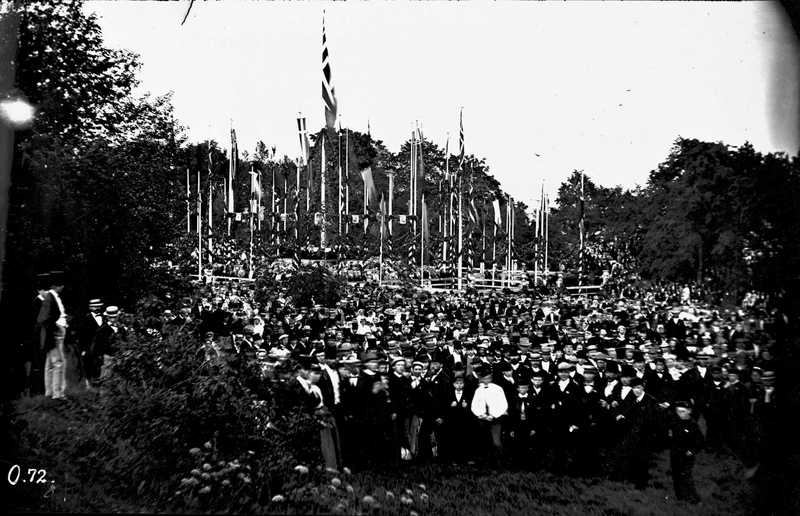
Royal wedding celebrations in 1869

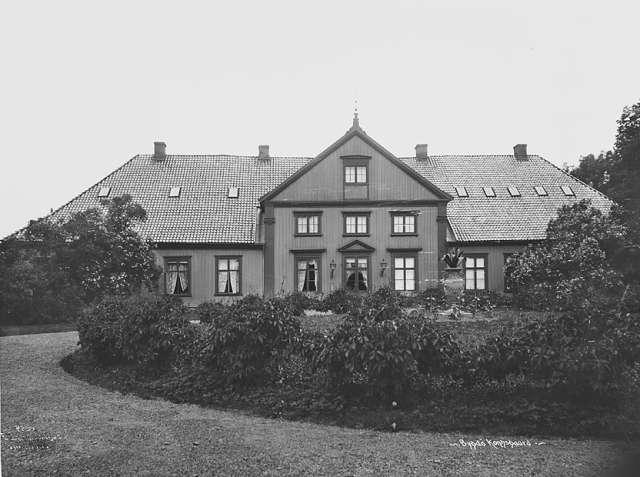
The estate in 1903

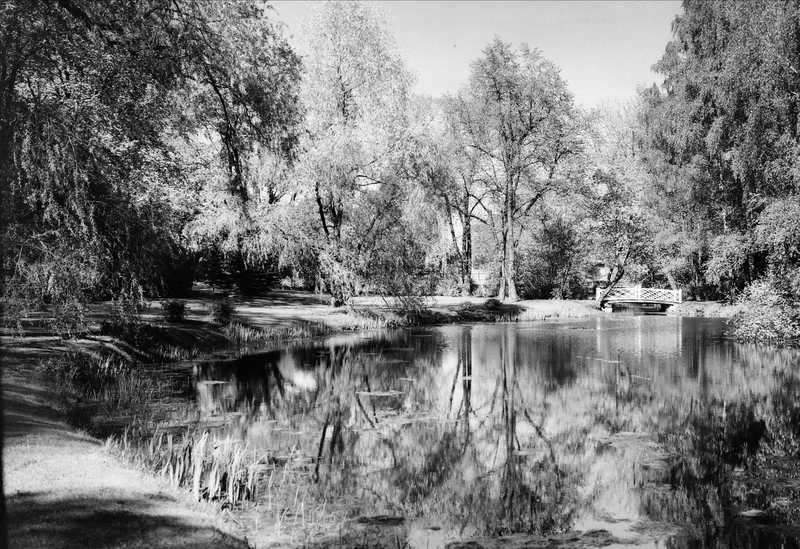
The estate's English landscape garden

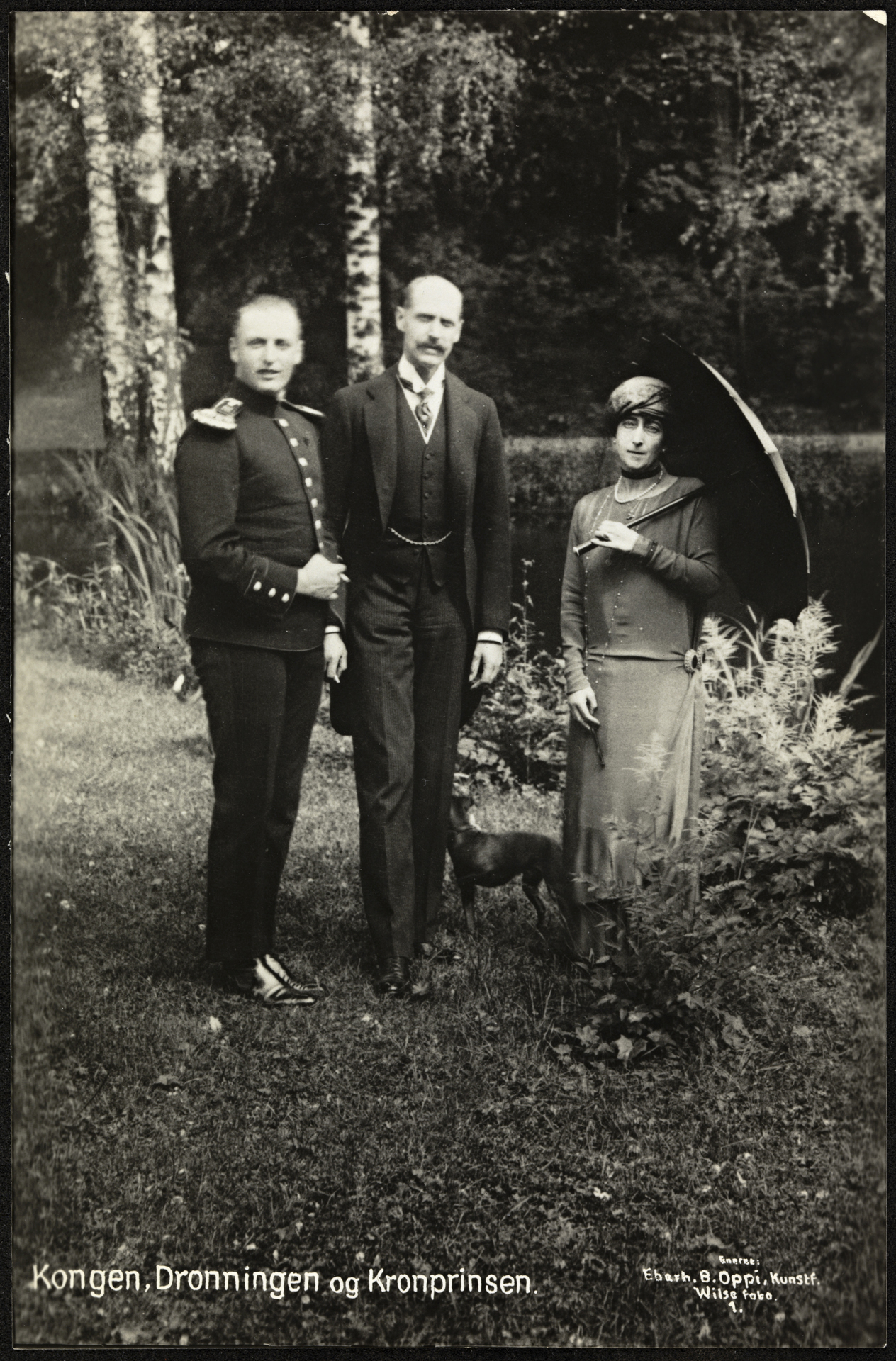
King Haakon VII, Crown Prince Olav and Queen Maud in the estate gardens, 1924

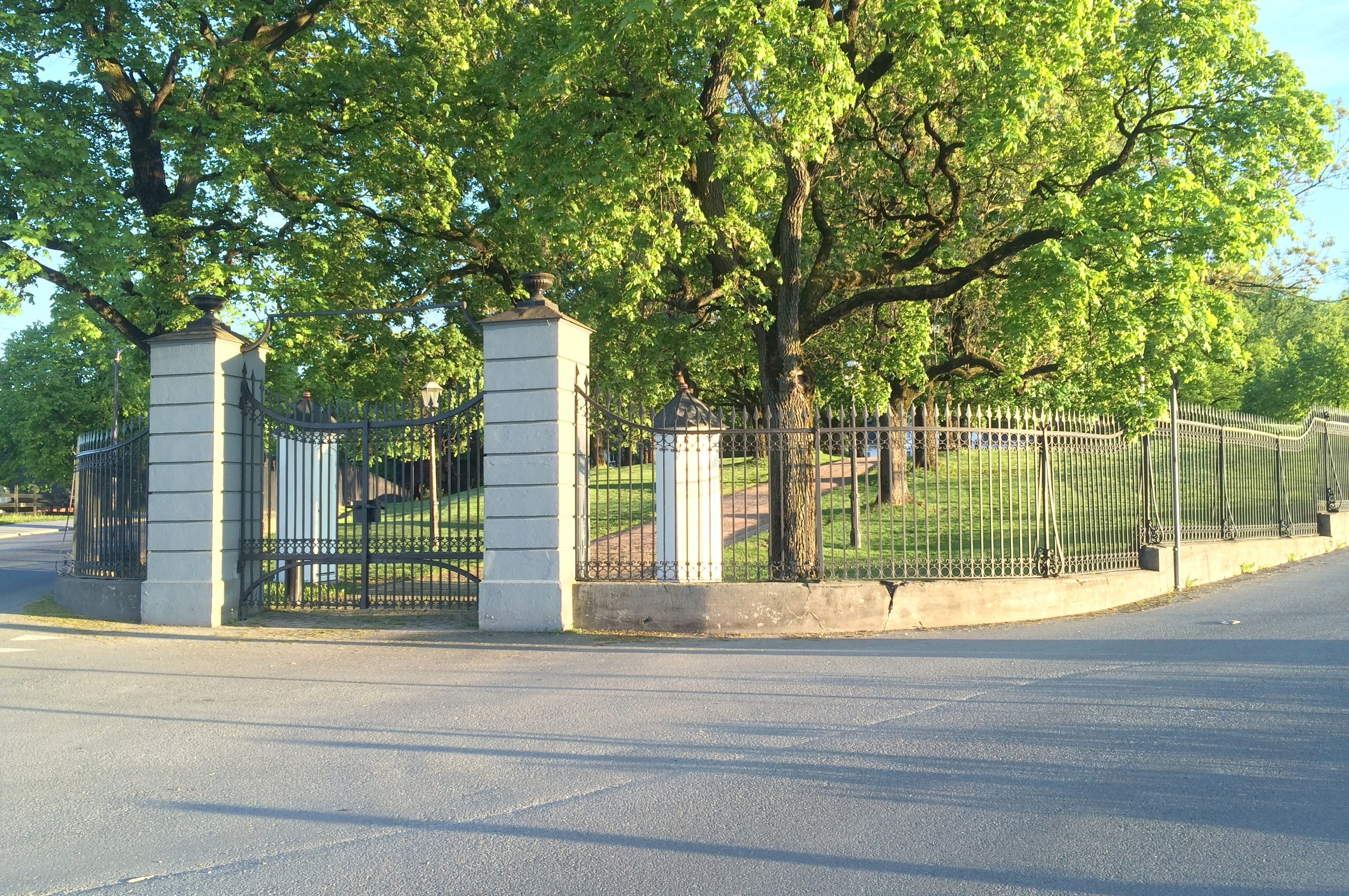
Gates leading to Bygdøy Royal Estate

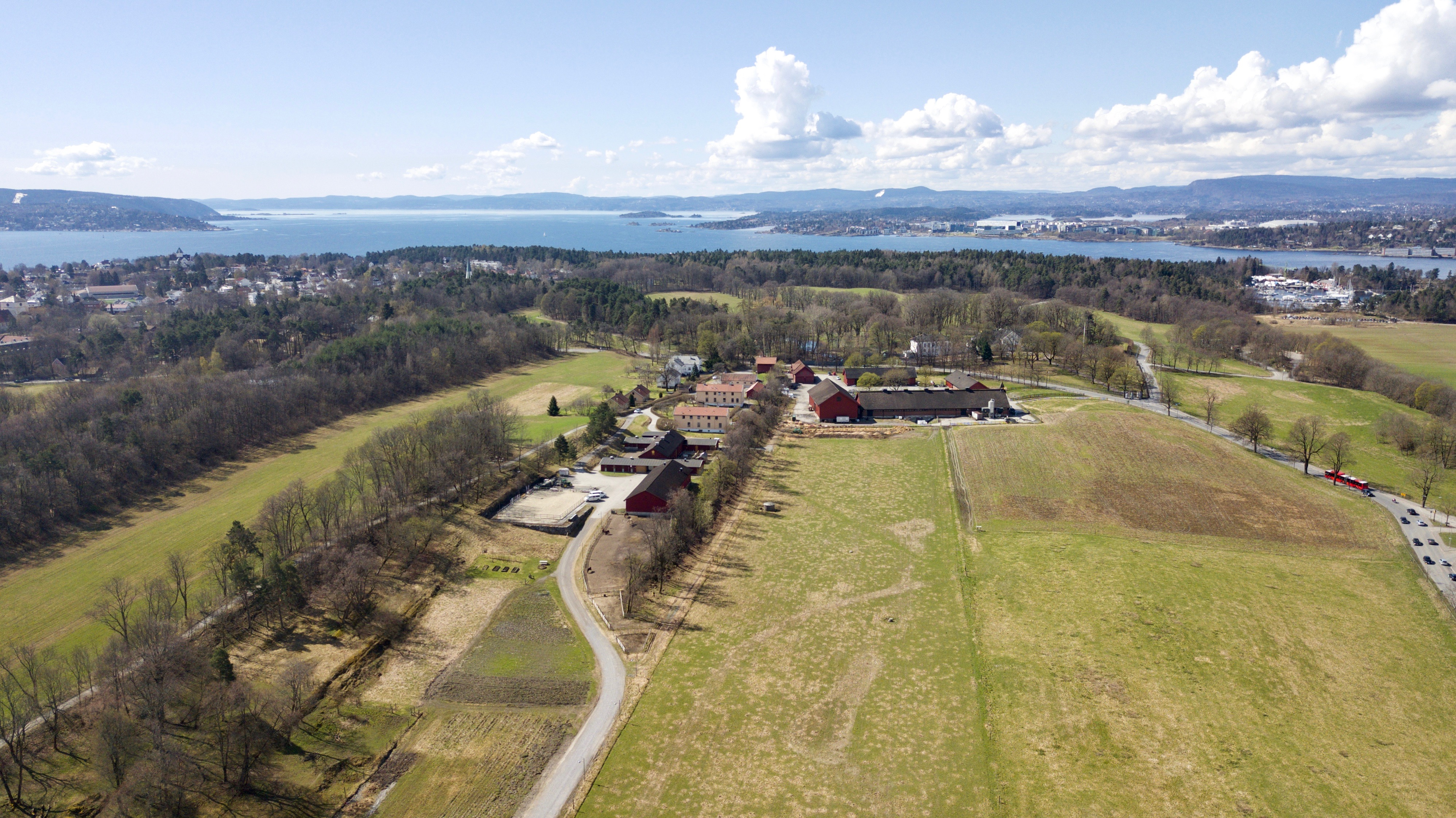
Aerial view of the estate in 2018
