= Jørgen Reedtz =

County governor, diplomat and landowner (c. 1625–1682)

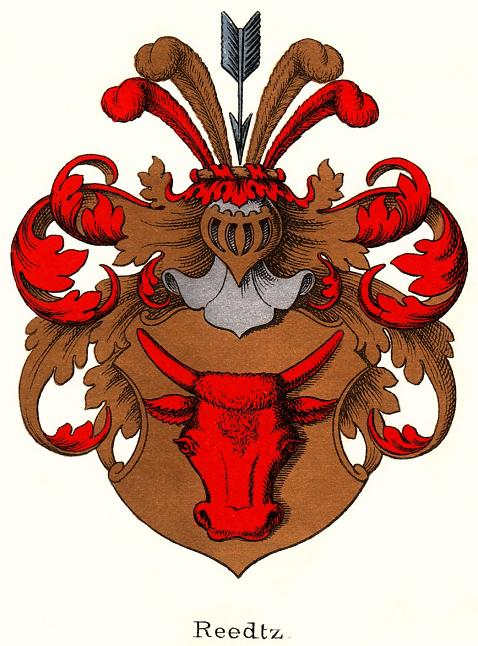
Reedtza's coat of arms.

Jørgen Reedtz (c. 1625 – 1682) was a Danish government official, diplomat and landowner. He served as Danish ambassador to the Spanish court in the 1670s. He was married to Mette Trolle.

== Biography ==
Reedtz was born in c. 1625 at Tygestrup, the son of Frederik Reedtz til Tygestrup and Birgitte Brahe. In 1649–1654, Reedtz served as royal secretary. In 1660–1661, Reedtz served as county governor of Tryggevælde. In 1664–1671, he served as county governor of Ringsted.

In 1659, he inherited the estates Jungshoved on Zealand and Vedø in Djursland.

On 4 June 1654, he married Mette Trolle (b. 1637). She was a daughter of Niels Trolle and Helle Rosenkrantz. She engaged in an affair with Peder Schumacher. When Schumarcher planned to marry Karen Nansen, he had his mistress removed from Copenhagen by having Jørgen Reedtz sent to Madrid as Danish envoy (1671—79). In her memoirs, Marie Mancini mentions Reedtz's wife as a woman of great influence at the Spanish court in 1675. His wife and their three children all converted to Catholicism. Their two daughters lived out their lives as nuns and their son became a monk.

Reedtz stayed in Marid until his wife's death in 1680. After his return to Denmark, he settled on his estate Vedø. He died in 1682.

Civic offices
| Preceded by [None | County Governor of Tryggevælde Amt; 1660—1661 | Succeeded by Otto Krabbe |
| Preceded by Henning Pogwisch | County Governor of Ringsted Amt; 1694—1671 | Succeeded by Hygo Lützoy |
