= Hans von Bøfke =

Danish government official and landowner

Hans Bøfke (died 1707) was a Danish government official and landowner. He was ennobled by Christian V of Denmark in 1684 under the name von Bøfke. He owned Førslevgaard at Holbæk.

== Early life and background ==
Bøfke was born in c. 1656 in Copenhagen, the son of Ditmer Bøfke (Ditmer Boefke) and Maren Nansen. His maternal grandfather was mayor Hans Nansen. His father was from Dortmund but had settled in Copenhagen in 1625. He was a wealthy merchant, major stakeholder in the Danish Iceland Company and took part in public life as councilman and one of the city's 32 Men. At the time of his death in 1681, he left an inheritance of 134,932 rigsdaler in bonds and 16,000 rigsdaler in cash for Bøfke and his elder half brother Jørgen.

== Career ==
Unlike the half brother Jørgen, Bøfke did not follow in their father's footsteps but entered government service. On 12 April 1684, he was awarded the title of Kommerceraad.

On 17 September 1687, he was appointed deputy county governor of Antvorskov and Korsør counties. On 28 March 1693, he was appointed county governor of the same counties. In August 1694, he was transferred to Bornholm. In 1694, he was also promoted to etatsråd. He retired as county governor of Bornholm on 30 September 1699.

== Personal life ==
On 30 April 1684, he married Anna Marie von Ehrenschild (1667–1723), She was a daughter of Conrad Bierman von Ehrenschild and Anna Knoff. Less than a month after the wedding, on 24 May, he was ennobled under the name von Bøffke. In 1685, he bought Gørskevgaard from Steen Hohendorff. In 1705, he sold it to Peter Rodsteen.

Bøfke died in 1707. His son Conrad became the last male member of the noble branch of the Bøfke family. Their daughter Charlotte Amalie Bøfke was married to Caspar Martin Schøller.

Civic offices
Preceded by Hugo Lützow	County Governor of Antvorskov Amt; 1693–1694	Succeeded by Claus Henrik Vieregg
Preceded by Hugo Lützow	County Governor of Korsør Amt; 1694–1671	Succeeded by Claus Henrik Vieregg
Preceded by Johan Didrik Wettberg	County Governor of Korsør Amt; 1694–1671	Succeeded by Valdemar Reedtz
