= Gideon von der Lühe =

Danish government official

Gideon von der Lühe (3 September 1704 — 5 February 1755) was a Danish government official. He served as county governor of Vordingborg County.

== Biography ==
Lühe was born on 3 September 1704 in Rostock, the son of Didrik Otto von d. Lühe til Dambek and Amalie du Puits.

== Vareer ==
In 1719, Lüh was appointed court page for princess Arabella Amalie. In 1729, he was promoted to hofjunker. In 1736, he became kammerjunker fpor princess Charlotte Amalie. On 4 September 1848, he was created a Knight in the Order of the Dannebrog.

On 27 September 1748, Lühe succeeded Caspar Martin Schøller as county governor Vordingborg. As of 10 November 1750, he concurrently served as county governor of Tryggevøæde. Pn 23 September 1751, he was transferred to Bykøbing County.

== Personal life ==
Lühe was married to Margrethe Hedevig Lützow (1727—1768) on 18 March 1749.She was a daughter of army major Christian Julius von Lützow and Johanne Christine von Leuenburg. After Their children included county governor and writer Frederik Carl Emil v. d. Luhe (1751-1801)..

Lühe died on 5 February 1755. His widow married secondly to county governor in Joachim Ehrenreich von Behr.

Civic offices
Preceded by Caspar Martin Schøller	County Governor of Vordingborg County; 1746—1750	Succeeded by Ludvig Christian Oertz
Preceded by Ludvig Christian von Oertz	County Governor of Tryggevøæde County; 1750—1751	Succeeded by Ludvig Christian von Oertz
Preceded by Peter Otto Rosenorn	County Governor of Nyløbing County; 1746—1750	Succeeded by Ludv. Chr. v. Oertz
