= Ditlev Vibe =

Danish government official

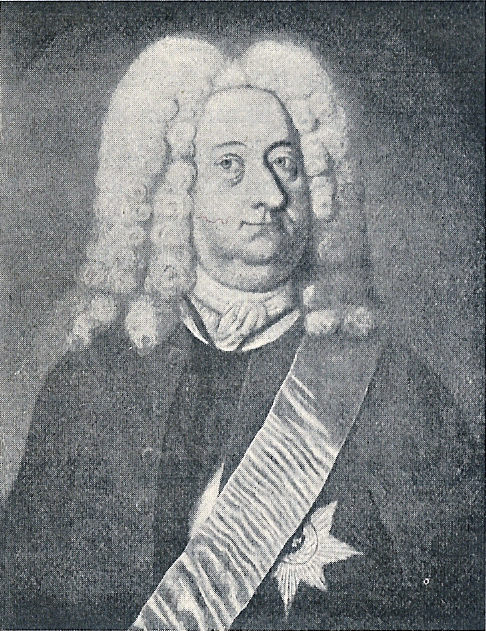

Governor-general of Norway
- In office 11 April 1722 – 5 October 1731
- Preceded by: Frederik Krag
- Succeeded by: Christian Rantzau

Personal details
- Born: 15 October 1670 Breitenburg
- Died: 5 October 1731 (aged 60) Christiania
- Resting place: St. Peter's Church
- Awards: Order of the Elephant and Order of the Dannebrog

Ditlev Vibe (15 October 1670 – 5 October 1731) was a Danish government official and Governor-general of Norway from 1722 until his death.

== Early life and family ==
He was born at Breitenburg in the Duchy of Holstein (now Schleswig-Holstein), Germany. He was the son of Vice Chancellor Michael Madsen Wibe (1627–1690) and Margrethe Catharine Reimer (1643–1683). Vibe belonged to an influential Danish family. His father was knighted in 1679. His grandfather, Mads Jensen Medelfar (1579–1637), had been the Bishop of Diocese of Lund (1620–1637).

== Career ==
He finished his formal education with an extended journey abroad, returning to Denmark in 1695. In 1704 he accompanied King Frederick IV of Denmark-Norway on a tour of Norway during the Great Northern War. During the winter of 1708–09, he accompanied the king on his journey to the Italian city of Venice. Vibe served as an adviser to the king and was in 1708 appointed to the Privy Council; later that year he became a member of the national government.

He was appointed Governor-general of Norway in 1722. He came into conflict with Bartholomæus Deichman, bishop of the Diocese of Oslo. Vibe often opposed his proposals and won acceptance for his view with the king. He lived at the Bygdøy Royal Estate, and became the owner of Rosendal Estate in 1725. Since 1690, Vibe had also owned Freidenfelde Manor in the Duchy of Holstein and in 1725 he became the owner of Barony Rosendal in Hardanger. He was decorated with the Order of Dannebrog and with the Order of the Elephant.
