= Mette Trolle =

Danish noblewoman

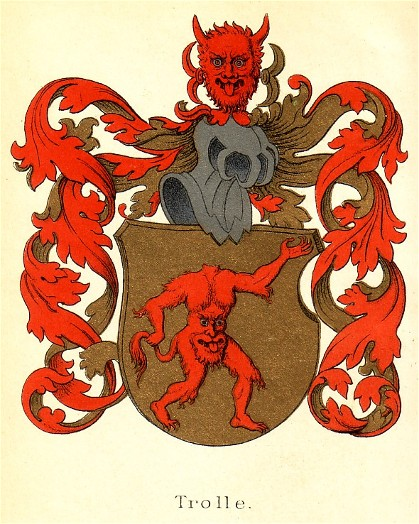
Trolle coat of arms.jpg

Mette Trolle (1637 – floruit 1679), was a Danish noblewoman, poet and Catholic convert, known for her unconventional life style.

== Biography ==
She was the daughter of noble Niels Trolle (1599-1667) and Helle Rosenkrantz (1618-85), and was in 1654 forced to marry the noble Jørgen Reedtz til Vedø in an arranged marriage against her will. The marriage was notoriously unhappy, and Trolle mocked Reetz in public. Mette Trolle was described as talented, educated, gifted and charming, and wrote poems in French and Dutch. She caused a scandal by her love affair with Peder Schumacher Griffenfeld. In 1670, when Griffenfeld wished to terminate their relationship and marry another, he convinced the King to appoint Jørgen Reedtz Danish ambassador to Spain and order her to accompany him there. However, she and Griffenfeld continued their love affair by correspondence. In Spain, Mette Trolle became a favourite of the regent of Spain, Mariana of Austria. She and several of her children converted to Catholicism, and when her spouse returned to Denmark in 1679, she remained. Regent Mariana awarded Mette Trolle a Spanish royal pension and the title Duchess of Avela.
