= Christen Friis =

Danish nobleman, politician and patron of arts and science

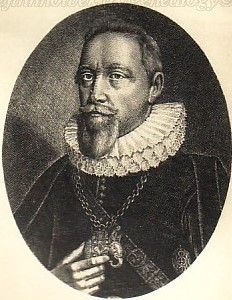
- Christen Friis by Simon van de Passe
- Born: November 4, 1581; Kastrup, Denmark
- Died: October 1, 1639 (aged 57); Copenhagen, Denmark
- Parent: Jørgen Friis
- Honours: Order of the Elephant (1616)

Christen Friis (4 November 1581 – 1 October 1639) was a Danish nobleman, politician, and patron of arts and science.

== Biography ==
Friis was born on 4 November 1581 in Kastrup to Jørgen Friis and Else Bjørnsdatter. He attended Sorø Academy. In 1610 he inherited Borreby Castle from his paternal uncle, Johan Friis. He later also inherited Kragerup in 1610 and purchased Lindholm manor in 1633. He married Barbara Wittrup (1591–1653) on 8 May 1614, with whom he had several children, including Hans Friis and Else Friis.

Friis became Chancellor of Denmark in 1616. He was an opponent of the continuation of the Kalmar War and advocated peace measures to Christian IV of Denmark.

He was a patron of the astronomer Christen Sørensen Longomontanus and the historians Johannes Pontanus and Johannes Meursius, and a friend of the natural historian Ole Worm.

Friis died on 1 October 1639 in Copenhagen.
