= Ernst Gottschalck Bülow =

German-Danish military officer and county governor

Ernst Gottschalck Bülow (22 July 1672 – 27 December 1721) was a German-Danish military officer and county governor of Antvorskov County. He was forced to marry Charlotte Helene von Schindel, Frederick IV's former mistress, after having engaged in an affair with her which resulted in the birth of a daughter.

== Biography ==
Bülow was born on 22 July 1672 at Northeim at Hannover, the son of captain and later major-general Barthold Bülow (c. 1620-94) and Anna Elisabeth von Hitzacker. He went into French military service in 1692. In 1702, he went into Danish military service in Flanderen. In 1704, he was promoted to major. He was wounded in the battles of Oudenarde and Malplaquet. In 1710, he became the leader of a dragoon regiment as part of the Danish campaign in Swedish Pomerania. On 5 December 1711, he was severely wounded in the Battle of Wismar.

Bülow left the army in 1713. In the same year, he was appointed county governor of Antvorskov. Not long thereafter, he entered into an affair with Frederick IV's former mistress Charlotte Helene von Schindel, Countess of Frederiksholm, which resulted in the birth of a daughter. The couple tried to conceal their child, but when the monarch was informed, they were given orders to marry and immediately leave the country. The wedding took place on 9 February 1716. Næsbyholm and Bavelse reverted to the crown when the countship was dissolved. The couple settled in Hamburg with a modest pension from the king.

Civic offices
| Preceded by Johan Frederik Thillemann | County Governor of Antvorskov Amt; 1713–1716 | Succeeded by Heinrich Leopold von Schindel |
