= Axel Gyldenstierne =

Danish statesman

Governor-general of Norway
- In office 1588–1601
- Monarch: Christian IV
- Preceded by: Ludvig Munk
- Succeeded by: Jørgen Friis

Personal details
- Born: Aksel Knudsen Gyldenstierne c. 1542
- Died: 13 July 1603 Sandviken, Gotland

Axel Gyldenstierne (born c. 1542, died 13 July 1603 at Sandviken, Gotland) was a Danish-Norwegian official and Governor-general of Norway from 1588 until 1601.

== Northern Seven Years' War ==
He is first mentioned in the records during the Northern Seven Years' War (1563–1570), when he served at King Frederik II’s court, as well as in field operations. He was a member of the king's retinue at the peace treaty negotiations at Roskilde and served as the government's messenger to peace mediators in Szczecin. His records were a significant contribution to the recorded Danish history of this war. The Treaty of Stettin was concluded on 13 December 1570, ending the Northern Seven Years' War between the Swedish Empire and Denmark-Norway (in alliance with Lübeck and Poland-Lithuania). The treaty was favorable for Denmark, assuring Danish hegemony in Northern Europe for a short period.

== Danish National Council ==
After the war he was awarded feudal lordships in Denmark and Skåne. From 1579 he served as a judge in Skåne; from 1581, he was a member of the Danish National Council and in 1585 he and Christoffer Valkendorf were responsible for the national government in the king's absence.

== Service in Norway ==
When King Fredrik II died in 1588 Christian IV's regents (Christian IV was inducted as a child king), appointed Gyldenstierne to serve as Governor-general of Norway and feudal overlord of Akershus. He worked in close consultation with the regents, traveling annually to Copenhagen to confer with them and participate in Danish meetings. During his time as governor-general he established a ministry of justice, upgraded Akershus fortress, raised taxes, and limited the ingress of Sweden in the north.

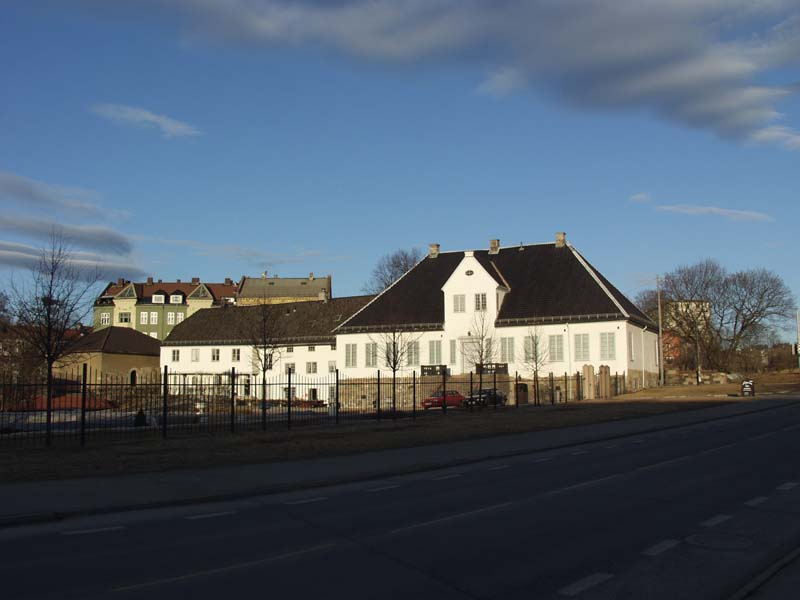
Old Bishop's Palace in Oslo

While there, Gyldenstierne played a central role at the wedding of James VI of Scotland and Princess Anne of Denmark in Oslo. Anne and James were formally married at the Old Bishop's Palace in Oslo on 23 November 1589, "with all the splendour possible at that time and place". So that both bride and groom could understand, Leith minister David Lindsay conducted the ceremony in French, describing Anne as "a Princess both godly and beautiful...she giveth great contentment to his Majesty". On 15 December 1589 James VI decided to reward Steen Brahe and Gyldenstierne for their good service in attending Anne of Denmark and organising the reception and lodging of his retinue with a gift of silver plate. The cupboard of silver had been a gift from Queen Elizabeth.

Gyldenstierne also organized the Norwegian tribute to Christian IV in June 1591. He also played a personal role in encouraging Peder Claussøn Friis, a historian, linguist and scientist, to translate the Norse sagas which tell of the lives of Scandinavian kings from old Norse to Danish-Norwegian. The translations came into the possession of Ole Worm, who first printed them in 1633.

== Retirement ==
Gyldenstierne left on his own initiative in 1601, and received two fiefs in Blekinge. He participated in a trip to Russia, 1602–03, as an escort for the Danish king's brother, Prince Hans, who was to marry Tsar Boris Godunov's daughter Ksenia (Xenia), but fell ill and died before the marriage could take place. He died during the journey back home.
