= Claus Henrik Vieregg =

Danish-Norwegian politician (1655–1713)

Deputy Governor-general of Norway
- In office 4 August 1712 – 14 July 1713
- Monarch: Frederick IV
- Preceded by: Woldemar Løvendal
- Succeeded by: Frederik Krag

Personal details
- Born: 1655; Mecklenburg-Güstrow
- Died: 14 July 1713 (aged 57-58); Norway
- Citizenship: Denmark-Norway
- Occupation: politician

Claus Henrik von Vieregg (1655 – 14 July 1713) was a German-Danish government official who served as county governor on Zealand and director of the General Post Office (Postvæsenet) before his appointment as deputy Governor-general of Norway (then part of Denmark-Norway) from 1712 to 1713.

== Early life and family ==
Vieregg was born in 1655 to Joachim Heinrich von Vieregg and Anna Margrethe von Hahn. His father was a member of the privy council of Gustav Adolph, Duke of Mecklenburg-Güstrow, and was a major general and commandant in Glückstadt. Vieregg's younger brother, Volrad Paris von Vieregg (1662–1736), became a successful Mecklenburg politician and Danish military officer.

== Biography ==
Vieregg began his career in 1684 when he was appointed chamberlain to Prince Christian. In 1690, he was appointed the prince's hofmester, or court master. He married Margrethe Lucie von Brockdorff in 1690.

In 1694, Vieregg was made Amtmann of Antvorskov and Korsør counties, located in modern-day Slagelse municipality. He held these positions until 1703 when he was promoted to the privy council of King Frederick IV. In 1704, he was promoted to a deputy in the General Commission for the Land and Maritime Administration. He was appointed county governor of Vordingborg County in 1710.

In 1711, Vieregg was appointed Director of the General Post Office, which he served until August 1712 when he was promoted to deputy Governor-general of Norway. He held this position until his death on 14 July 1713.

Civic offices
Preceded by Hans von Bøfke	County Governor of Antvorskov Amt; 1694—1703	Succeeded by Christian Vind
Preceded by Hans von Bøfke	County Governor of Korsør Amt; 1694—1703	Succeeded by Christian Vind
Preceded by Otto Krabbe	County Governor of Vordingborg County; 1710–1712	Succeeded by Christoffer Joachim Giese
