= Johan Vibe =

Danish military officer and engineer

Johan de Vibe
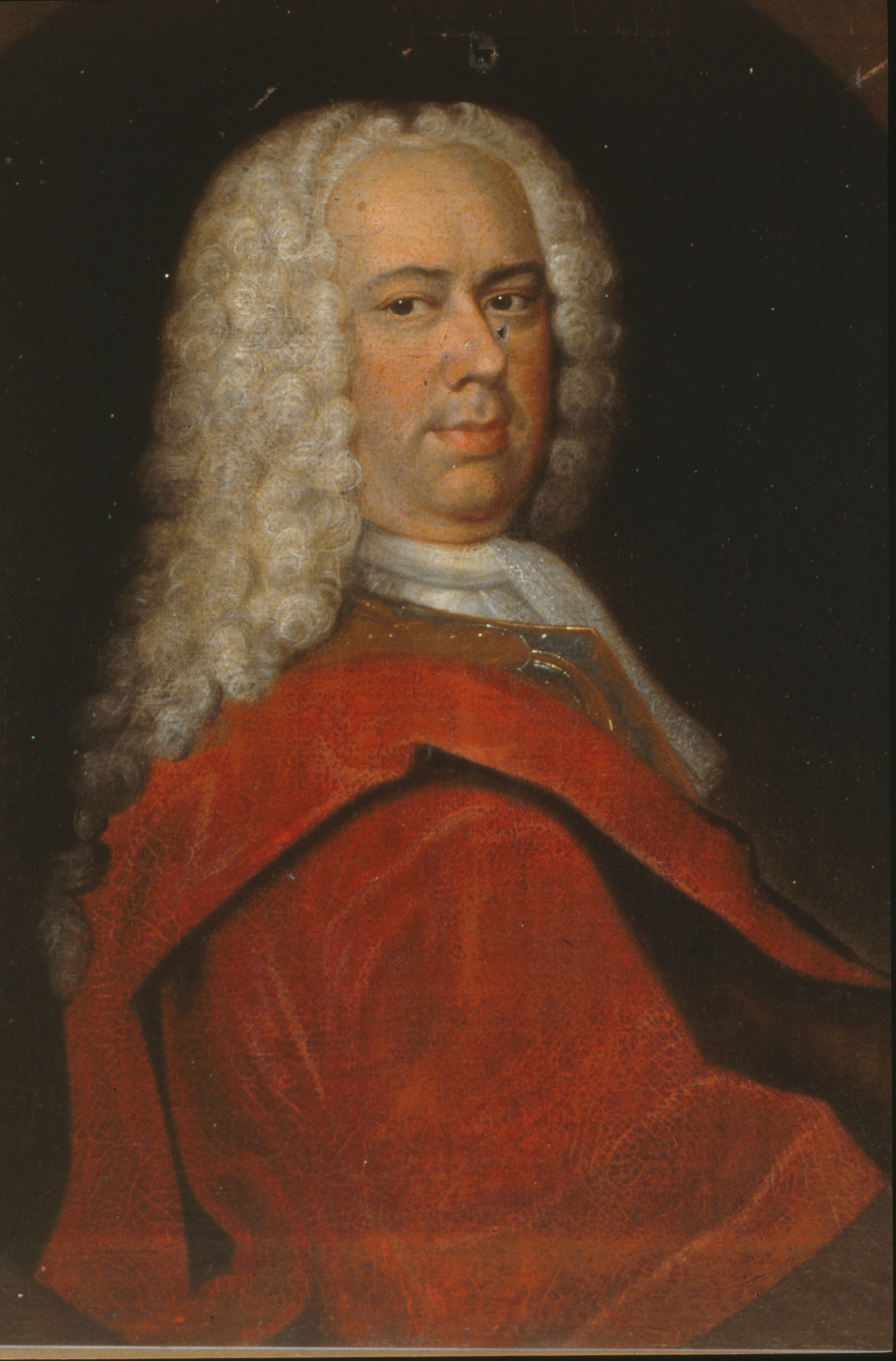
- Born: 16 April 1637; France
- Died: 20 February 1710 (aged 72) Christiania, Norway
- Buried: Nidaros Cathedral
- Allegiance: Denmark-Norway
- Service years: 1659 - 1710
- Rank: Major General
- Commands: Commander of the Norwegian army north of the Dovrefjell mountains

Johan Vibe (also Wibe) (16 April 1637 – 20 February 1710) was a Danish military officer and engineer, who was appointed Governor-General of Norway from 10 April 1708 until his death.

== Biography ==
Johan Vibe was born on as one of two illegitimate children of the Danish nobleman Peder Wibe (c. 1596–1658) and an unnamed French woman. He was raised as a legitimate son and ennobled using his father's arms in 1671. He received a military education in the Netherlands, finishing in 1659 and joined the Norwegian Army shortly after.

For his performance in the Gyldenløve War, for which the Norwegian offensives were generally successful but only served to offset the Danish setbacks elsewhere, he was promoted to major in 1675 and lieutenant colonel in 1676. He was given command of the squadron which gave support to the fleet with which Governor-General Ulrik Frederik Gyldenløve attacked the historically Norwegian Province of Bohuslan, which had been ceded to Sweden by the Treaty of Roskilde in 1658. Vibe kept enemy ships trapped in Alfsborg and prevented them from going out.

Johan Vibe was named a Knight of the Order of the Dannebrog in 1693. In 1708 he was elevated to counselor of the Danish realm (geheimeråd). Vibe advanced to major general in 1682 and was transferred to Trondheim as commander of the Norwegian military forces north of the Dovrefjell mountains.

He appointed Governor-General of Norway by the Danish-Norwegian crown from 1708 as successor to Frederik Gabel. Following his death in 1710, he was succeeded as Governor-General by Woldemar Gyldenløve (1660–1740), son of Ulrik Frederik Gyldenløve and Sophie Urne.
