= Woldemar Løvendal =

Danish statesman (1660–1740)

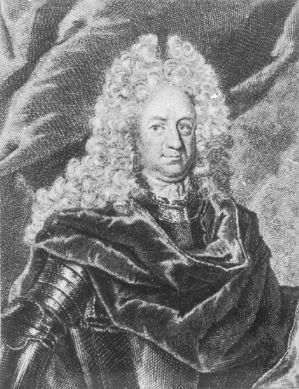

15th Governor-general of Norway
- In office 1 August 1710 – 30 April 1712
- Preceded by: Johan Vibe
- Succeeded by: Claus Henrik Vieregg

Personal details
- Born: Ulrik Fredrik Valdemar von Danneskiold-Løvendal; 25 September 1660 Denmark
- Died: 4 June 1740 (aged 79) Dresden, Saxony
- Children: Ulrich Friedrich Woldemar von Löwendal; Hedevig baroness Løvendal; +4 (died in infancy)
- Parents: Ulrik Fredrik Gyldenløve; Sophia Urne

Ulrik Fredrik Valdemar baron Løvendal (German: Woldemar Freiherr von Löwendal; 25 September 1660 – 4 June 1740), was a Danish-Norwegian baron, civil servant, and military officer. He served as Governor-general of Norway from 1710 to 1712, serving under King Frederick IV. He also served as Commanding General of Norway during the Great Northern War, and later as a high-ranking politician in Dresden.

== Early life ==
Ulrik Fredrik Valdemar Løvendal was born in Denmark on 25 September 1660 to Ulrik Frederik Gyldenløve and his first wife Sophie Urne, daughter of marshal Jørgen Knudsen Urne. He was born into the House of Oldenburg as his father was an illegitimate son of King Frederick III. Løvendal was born with a twin brother, Carl, who died in 1689.

== Career ==
=== Early military career ===
Løvendal started his military career in 1679 in the Blue Guards of the Dutch Republic, where he eventually achieved the rank of Lieutenant. In 1682, Løvendal and his brother Carl were both awarded the title of Baron von Løvendal.

In 1683, Løvendal served as an imperial guard colonel, equivalent to the rank of Major, during the Battle of Vienna. Following this, he entered Danish military service as a Lieutenant Colonel and an adjutant general in Norway. In 1684 he was promoted to the rank of Colonel and assigned commander of a new dragoon regiment which was garrisoned in Holstein. He was present with the French Army during the siege of Namur in 1682.

He was promoted again in 1699 to Brigadier, and after distinguishing himself with his service in the Great Northern War in 1700, he was promoted to Major General. After his promotion to Major General, Løvendal settled in Hamburg where he became a merchant.

=== Early political career in Dresden ===
His wife Dorothea died in 1706, causing him to move to Dresden. There, he gained favor with high ranking-politicians with the assistance of his late wife's cousin, the Countess of Cosel. This led to his employment in the court of Augustus II in 1707, where he was Chamber President and Chief Mining Director. While in Dresden, he gained favor with King Frederick IV of Denmark-Norway.

=== Governor-general of Norway ===
He returned to Denmark in 1710 and was promoted to Commanding General of Norway. He was also given the title of Director-General of Civil Service, making him the governor-general of Norway.

Resuming his leadership of the Danish-Norwegian troops in Norway during the Great Northern War, Løvendal led an invasion of Bohuslän in 1711 to prevent Sweden from sending troops to Germany. The incursion failed, however Løvendal garnered widespread support for Norway among the population of Bohuslän. Løvendal encouraged public anger towards Swedish king Charles XII by pointing out the king's friendliness towards the Ottoman Empire and the Turks. Because of this, he was awarded the Order of the Elephant when he returned to Denmark in 1712.

=== Later political career in Dresden ===
Shortly after returning to Denmark, Løvendal left the Danish military and returned to Dresden to replace August II's chief court marshal who had died. He was also appointed to August II's Privy Council, and later became a cabinet minister in 1717.

In 1721, Løvendal was awarded the Order of the White Eagle. He continued to serve his political positions until his death in 1740.

== Personal life and death ==
Løvendal married Dorothea Margrethe Brockdorff of the Holsteiner Brockdorff family in 1687. They had two children together, Hedevig and Ulrich Friedrich Woldemar von Löwendal. After the death of his first wife, he remarried to Benedicte Margrethe Rantzau of the Saxon Rantzau family in 1709. They had four children together, however none of them survived infancy.

Løvendal owned three estates in Brandenburg throughout his life. He first purchased the Schloss Elsterwerda manor in Elsterwerda in 1708. In 1716, he purchased two additional manors at Schloss Mückenberg in Lauchhammer and Schloss Saathain in Röderland. After encountering financial troubles, Løvendal sold his manor at Schloss Elsterwerda to August II in 1727.

Løvendal died in Dresden on 4 June 1740.
