= Vordingborg County =

Former Danish county

Vordingborg County is a former Danish county on the southernmost part of Zealand. It was named for the town of Vordingborg. The county's largest town was Næstved.

== History ==
Vordingborg was established in 1662 as a replacement of the old Vordingborg Len. Just one year later, in 1663, it was expanded with the short-lived Jungshoved County. From then on, it comprised the hundreds Bjæverskov, Fakse and Stevns. In 1860, Vordingborg County was administrated together with Tryggevælde County. In 1803, Vordingborg and Tryggevælde counties were formally merged as Præstø County.

== List of county governors ==
| Portrait | Incumbent | Term |
|---|---|---|
| | Ulrik Frederik Gyldenlove | 1660—166 |
| | Christoffer Parsberg | 1664—1671 |
| | Otte Krabbe | 1671—1672 |
| | Vacant (Franke Meinertsen acting) | 1672—1680 |
| | Christian Siegfried von Plessen | 1680—1698 |
| | Otto Krabbe (2nd term) | 1698—1710 |
| | Claus Henrik Vieregg | 1710—1712 |
| | Christoffer Joachim Giese | 1712—1719 |
| | Caspar Martin Schøller | 1719—1748 |
| | Gideon von der Lühe | 1748—1755 |
| | Ludvig Christian Oertz | 1751—1755 |
| | Hannibal Wedell | 1755—1757 |
| | Wolf Veit Christoph von Reitzenstein | 1757—1766 |
| | Christian Ditlev Rantzau | 1766—1767 |
| | Henrik Brockenhuus | 1767—1776 |
| | Johan Rudolph Bielke | 1776—1803 |

== See also ==
- List of county governors of Copenhagen
- List of county governors of Møn
