= Christian Vind =

Danish army officer and county governor (1664–1712)

Christian Vind (12 August 1664–11 September 1712) was a Danish army officer and county governor.

== Early life and background ==
Vind was born on 12 August 1664, the son of Holger Vind til Harrestedgård and Moder Margrete Ovesdatter Vind (née Gjedde). His maternal grandfather was Ove HGedde. His brother was Frederik Vind.

== Career ==
Vind became an army officer in 1684. On 30 July 1701, he reached the rank of colonel-lieutenant in Prince Carl's Regiment in Italy. After returning to Denmark, on 2 February 1704, he was appointed county governor of Antvorskov and Korsør counties. On 7 November 1708, he was awarded the title of etatsråd.

== Personal life ==
Vind was married twice. His first wife was Anne Cathrine Walkendorff (1662–1697), a daughter of Christopher Walkendorff and Anne Jørgensdatter Vind. She was the widow of county governor Joachim Christoffer Bülow til Rosenlund. Secondly, he was married on 30 April 1701 to Elisabeth Juel (1675–1741). She was a daughter of Peder Juel til Vrejlev and Helvig Krabbe.

Vind died on 11 September 1712. Together, he and his second wife had two children. The son Holger Christian Christianson Vind (1704–1763), an army officer, with rank of major-general, served as commandant of Nyborg Castle. He was married to Hedevig Albertine von Ahlefeldt (1705–1775), a daughter of Claus von Ahlefeldt and Anna Margrethe Hedevig Christiansdatter Vind (1707–1756) inherited Vrejlev Priory, Rønnovsholm and Fuglsig from her aunt, Ingeborg Juel. She was later married to Johan Ludvig Holstein (1694–1763). He served as president of Fanske Kancelli and constructed Ledreborg Castle.

Civic offices
Preceded by Claus Henrik Vieregg	County Governor of Antvorskov Amt; 1704–1712	Succeeded by Johan Frederik Thillemann
Preceded by Claus Henrik Vieregg	County Governor of Korsør Amt; 1704–1712	Succeeded by Johan Frederik Thillemann
