= Jørgen Friis =

Danish statesman (died 1616)

Governor-general of Norway
- In office 1601–1608
- Monarch: Christian IV
- Preceded by: Axel Gyldenstjerne
- Succeeded by: Enevold Kruse

Personal details
- Died: 1616 Skørping, Denmark
- Children: Christen Friis

Jørgen Friis (died 1616 in Skørping) was a Danish lord and Governor-general of Norway from 1601 to 1608.

During his lifetime, the Danish nobility had a monopoly on a number of administrative offices. Friis was a member of that small class of upper nobility whose had access to the highest positions in Denmark-Norway, including membership on the riksråd. He became Governor-general of Norway in 1601 and initiated a major effort to revise the Norwegian law which led to Christian IV’s Norwegian Law of 1604.

== Personal life ==
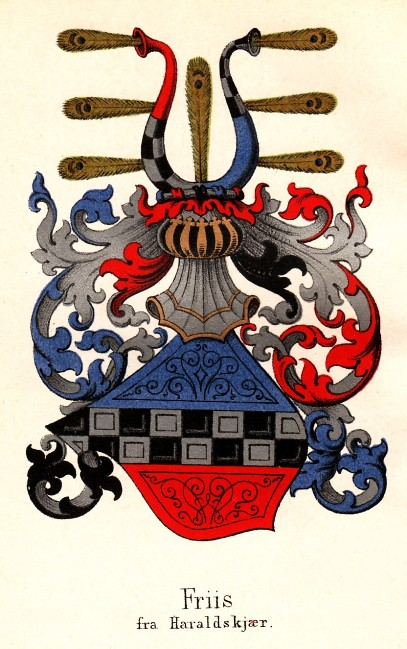
Coat of arms of the Friis family, illustrated by Anders Thiset, 1886.

The date of Friis' birth is unknown, though it is likely that he was born at Nes Castle in Denmark. His father, Ivar Friis (died 1557), was the lord at Nes, and his mother was Sophie Andersdatter Glob (died after 1574). His family was part of an early noble line from southern Jutland, which has been traced back to at least the mid 1300-century, based on the earliest recording of their coat-of-arms. The family belonged to the leading noble circles in Jutland, and Jørgen Friis had an upbringing that was common for young men of his standing. As a young man he experienced military action when in 1576 he served in the king's retinue during a campaign into Mecklenburg.

He was married three times, first on 2 August 1573 to the Danish nobelwoman Anne Pallesdatter Juel (died 19 December 1576), daughter of Palle Juel (died 1585), the judge in Nordjylland and Anne Lykke (died 1585). His second marriage was to the Danish nobelwoman Else Bjørnsdatter (1558–1594), daughter of the danish national counselor Bjørn Andersen (1532–1583) and Sidsel Truidsdatter Ulfstand (died 1561). His third marriage was to the Norwegian nobelwoman Lisbeth Christoffersdatter Galle (died 1616), daughter of the lord of Steinvikholm, Christoffer Galle (died 1555) and Birte Clausdatter Bille (1534–1613). She served as Acting County Sheriff of the County of Vinstrupgård, taking charge of the tenantry after the death of her first husband, Eggert Ulfeldt.

Friis had a total of twelve children: four daughters and eight sons. Several of his sons died while studying abroad. His son Christen Friis became Chancellor of Denmark in 1616. Friis died in 1616 in Skørping and was buried on the same day as his wife Lisbeth.

== Career ==
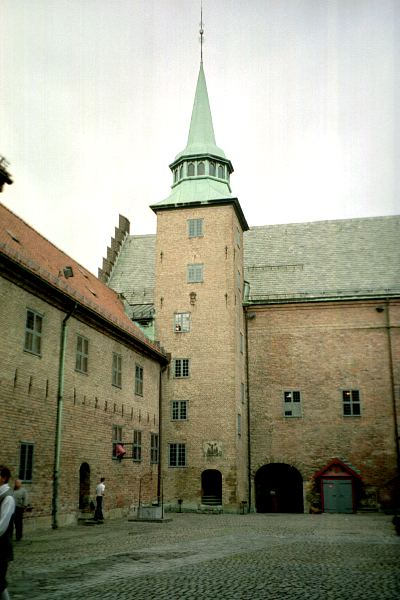
Friis resided at Akershus Fortress

Friis followed the traditional early career path of a nobleman, with service at court and as a court Junker in 1578. In 1580s-90s he served with various smaller in Denmark, and 1595, he became a judge in North Jutland, which provided him a good knowledge of the law and its interpretation. He achieved the highest rank in 1596, when he was named to the Danish national council (riksrådet).

Most of Friis' labor went to managing the numerous fiefs for which he was responsible. He also devoted attention to his personal interests. He had inherited Krastrup manor in North Jutland from his mother. The manor house at Krastrup burned in 1612, but was restored at Jørgen Friis’ direction.

=== Governor-general of Norway ===
In 1601 he was granted Norway's most important fief, Akershus, as well as the position of Governor-general of Norway. Friis served as Governor-general of Norway until 1608, when he returned to Denmark, where he was granted the far less labor-intensive Seilstrup fief, which he held until his death. When he assumed the role of Governor-general (statholder) from Axel Gyldenstjerne, Christian IV was present in Norway. Friis had to pledge that we would "listen and pay diligent heed to the complaints of the common people and help them secure justice."

His most important contributions were in translating and organizing the law. The Danish-Norwegian administrators found it absolutely necessary to recast the old Norwegian law, which was written in old Norse and difficult for them to interpret and apply. Moreover, there were newer laws that were not properly entered into the older documented law record. As early as 1557 Christian III had directed a revision of the Norwegian laws, without success. Frederick II had also directed a revision of the law in 1572, without success. Yet another royal direction to translate the laws and add provisions for fines had been addressed to the governor, Axel Gyldenstierne, in 1592.

Christian IV was one of the most remarkable of the Danish-Norwegian kings, having initiated many reforms and projects in both Denmark and Norway. He visited Norway 26 times, more times than all his predecessors combined, and became aware of the egregious abuses of the law by fief holders like Ludvig Munk. In 1602 Christian IV resided in Akershus, reviewed the need to revise the laws, and the governor-general Jørgen Friis, with the support of Anders Green and various men of the law, was commanded to prepare a new law book. Under the eye of the king, the commission work quickly, and the new law book, which was printed in 1604, entered into force in January 1605 under the name, KONG CHRISTIAN DEN FJERDES NORSKE LOVBOG af 1604. The law was essentially a Danish translation of the older Norwegian law created by Magnus VI and recorded in Norwegian from 1274 to 1276.

Friis' work on the Norwegian law was of great importance, since it produced a law book which was better suited to conditions that existed at that time in Scandinavia. As is common with the law, it had to be updated multiple times, including revisions by Jens Bjelke, but it served as the essential source of law until it was superseded by kong Christian 5s Norske Lov av 1687 (King Christian V's Norwegian Law of 1687).
