= Christoffer Joachim Giese =

Danish landowner and county governor

Christoffer Joachim Giese (6 January 1668 – 1719) was a Danish landowner and government official. He served as county governor of Vordingborg County.

== Early life and education ==
Giese was born on 6 January 1668 to Frederik Gise and Margrete Elisabeth von Schönbach. His father was a court official, first in Skatkammerkollegiet (until 1673) and then in Rentekammeret. His father established Giesegaard manor in 1663. In 1702, just one year prior to his death, he became county governor of Ringsted County. After his father's death in 1693, Giese and his mother became joint owners of Giesegaard.

== Career ==
Giese became a councillor (deputeret) in the Land- og Søetatens Generalkommissariat. On 19 July 1706, he was awarded the title of etatsråd. On 9 August 1712, he replaced Claus Henrik Vieregg, who had been appointed as deputy governor of Norway, then part of Denmark-Norway, as county governor of Vordingborg County.

== Personal life ==
Giese was married twice. His first wife was Charlottte Amalie Liime, a daughter of royal commissioner Claus Lauridsen Lyhme and Marie Jonasdatter Heinemark. They had eight children. After her death, Giese married secondly to Elisabeth Cathrine Wienecke, a daughter of royal mint master Christian Wienicke and baroness Anna Maria Jürgens. Giese died on 6 July 1719.

Civic offices
Preceded by Claus Henrik Vieregg	County Governor of Vordingborg County; 1712–1719	Succeeded by Caspar Martin Schøller
