= Enevold Kruse =

Danish noble (1554–1621)

Governor-general of Norway
- In office 1608–1618
- Monarch: Christian IV
- Preceded by: Jørgen Friis
- Succeeded by: Jens Hermansson Juel

Personal details
- Born: October 28, 1554
- Died: March 8, 1621 (aged 66); Sjælland, Denmark

Enevold Kruse (October 28, 1554 – March 8, 1621) was a Danish nobleman who served as Governor-general of Norway from 1608 to 1618.

== Career ==
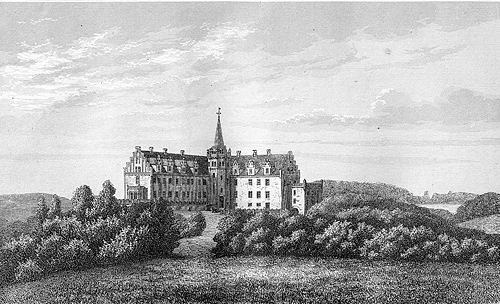
Tranekær castle - old etching

After studying abroad, including in Helmstedt, Germany, he was employed in 1578 at the Danish chancery, and his career advanced rapidly. He served in the Danish Treasury (responsible for accounting, payment and collection of customs duties and taxes, as well as management of state property, including forests, roads, and buildings) beginning in 1582 and retained that position until 1608.

In 1608, he was named feudal lord to Akershus in Norway, Governor-general of Norway, and a member of the Danish national council. He served as commander for the Norwegian forces during the Kalmar War between Denmark-Norway and Sweden from 1611 to 1613. As Governor-general, he accomplished relatively little in his latter years, falling into disagreement with Norwegian nobleman Jens Bjelke, who was the Chancellor of Norway.

During the last three years of his life, 1618–1621, he was named feudal lord at Tranekjær on Langeland in Denmark. He died at Sjælland.
