= Vilhelm Mathias Skeel =

Danish landowner, county official and military officer (1746–1817)

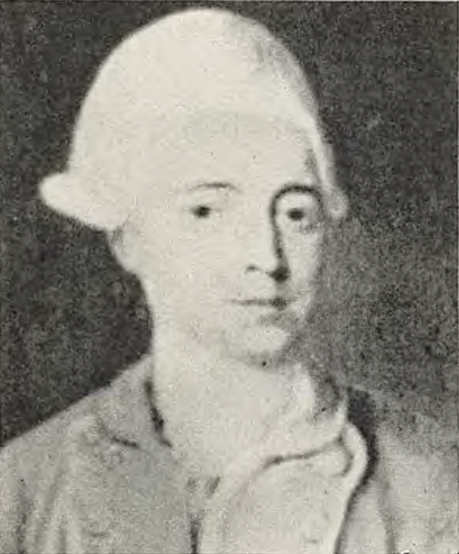
Vilhelm Mathias Skeel.

Vilhelm Mathias Skeel (2 June 1746 – 9 April 1817) was a Danish landowner, county official, and military officer.

== Early life and education ==
Skeel was born on 2 June 1747 at Nordborg Castle on Als, the son of Holger Andersen Skeel and Regitze Sophie Skeel (née baroness Gyldenkrone). His father owned the estates Til Birkelse, Broholm and Mullerup. Skeel matriculated from Sorø Academy. In 1760, he became a lieutenant at the Jutland Cacalry Regiment. In 1876, he earned a law degree (Cand.jur.) from the University of Copenhagen. In the same year, he reached the rank of ritmester. In 1766, he necame a kammerjunker. He left the army in 1770.

== Career ==
In 1772, Skeel was sent to Norway to serve as County Governor of Stavanger. On 21 October 1773, he was awarded the title of chamberlain. In 1781, he returned to Denmark. From 10 December 1783, he held a post in Rentekammeret (as "surnummerer deputeret"). In 1785, he was appointed as county governor of Korsør and Antvorskov counties (from 7 August). From 1787, he served concurrently as county governor of Sorø and Ringsted counties. In December 1798, he was dismissed from all the posts (with effect from 1 January 1799). In 1798, he had been appointed as patron of Roskilde Adelige Jomfrukloster.

== Persinal life ==
Skell was married to Alette Vind, a daughter of Holger Vind and Christiane Amalie Frederikke Rampe. After her death, he was married to her sister Mette Holgersdatter Vind. Vilhelm and Mette had six children.

Skeel owned Fårevejle (until 1767) and Krummerupgård and succeeded his father to Det Skeel'ske Majorat (1815).

Government offices
Preceded by Gunder Gundersen Hammer	County Governor of Stavanger amt 1772–1781	Succeeded by Peter Frederik Ulrik Benzon
Preceded by Esajas Fleischer	County Governor of Antvorskov Amt; 1785–1790	Succeeded by Poul Christian Stemann
Preceded by Esajas Fleischer	County Governor of Korsør Amt; 1785–1790	Succeeded by Poul Christian Stemann
