= Sorø County =

Former Danish county

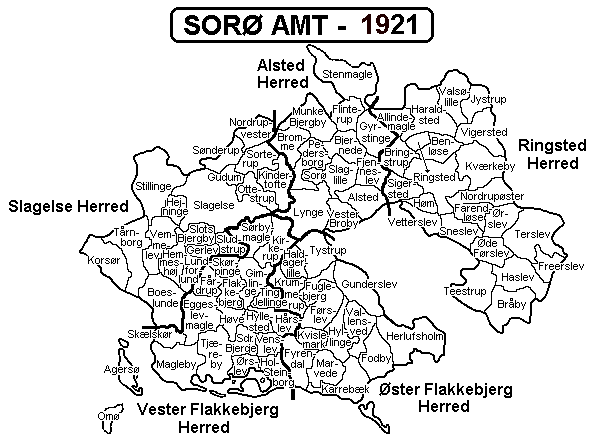
Sorø County.

Sorø County (Danish: Sorø Amt) was a Danish county on Zealand.

== History ==
Sorø County was created in 1662 as a replacement of the old Sorø Fief (Sorø Len). The county consisted of a single hundred. Beginning in 1748, Sorø County was administrated together with Ringsted County. At the 1793 Danish County Reform, with effect from 1798, Ringsted County, Korsør County, and Antvorskov were merged into Sorø County.

As of 1 April 1970, it was merged with Holbæk County as West Zealand County (Vestsjællands Amt).

== List of county governors of Sorø ==
The governors of Sorø County (Danish: Amtmænd, singular Amtmand) from 1653 until its dissolution in 1970, were:

Portrait	Name	Term
	Jørgen Rosenkrantz	1653—1675
	Niels Hansen Overberg	1675—1678 (acting)
	Friederik von Vicregge	1678—1684
	Frederik Gabel	1684—1695
	Poul (Hals) Moth	1696—1699
	Johan Diderik Grüner	1699—1712
	Jacob Frants von der Osten	1712—1735
	Wilhelm August von der Osten	1735—1743
	Christoph Ernst von Beulwitz	1743—1745
	Heinrich von Reuss	1745—1754
	Carl Juel	1754—1760
	Frederik Danneskiold-Samsøe	1760—1764
	Wolf Veit Christoph von Reitzenstein	1764—1781
	Carl Adolph Raben	1781—1784
	Gregers Christian Haxthausen	1784—1787
	Vilhelm Mathias Skeel	1787–1798
	Poul Christian Stemann	1798—1827
	Christian Ludvig Stemann	1827—1847
	Frederik Marcus Knuth	1847—1848
	Torkil Abraham Hoppe	1848—1871
	Emil Vedel	1871—1902
	Anton Groothoff	1903—1913
	Axel Henrik Bille-Brahe	1913—1928
	Vilhelm Topsoe	1928–1955
	Vilhelm Wedell-Wedellsborg	1955–1970

== See also ==
- List of county governors of Korsør
