= Kragerup =

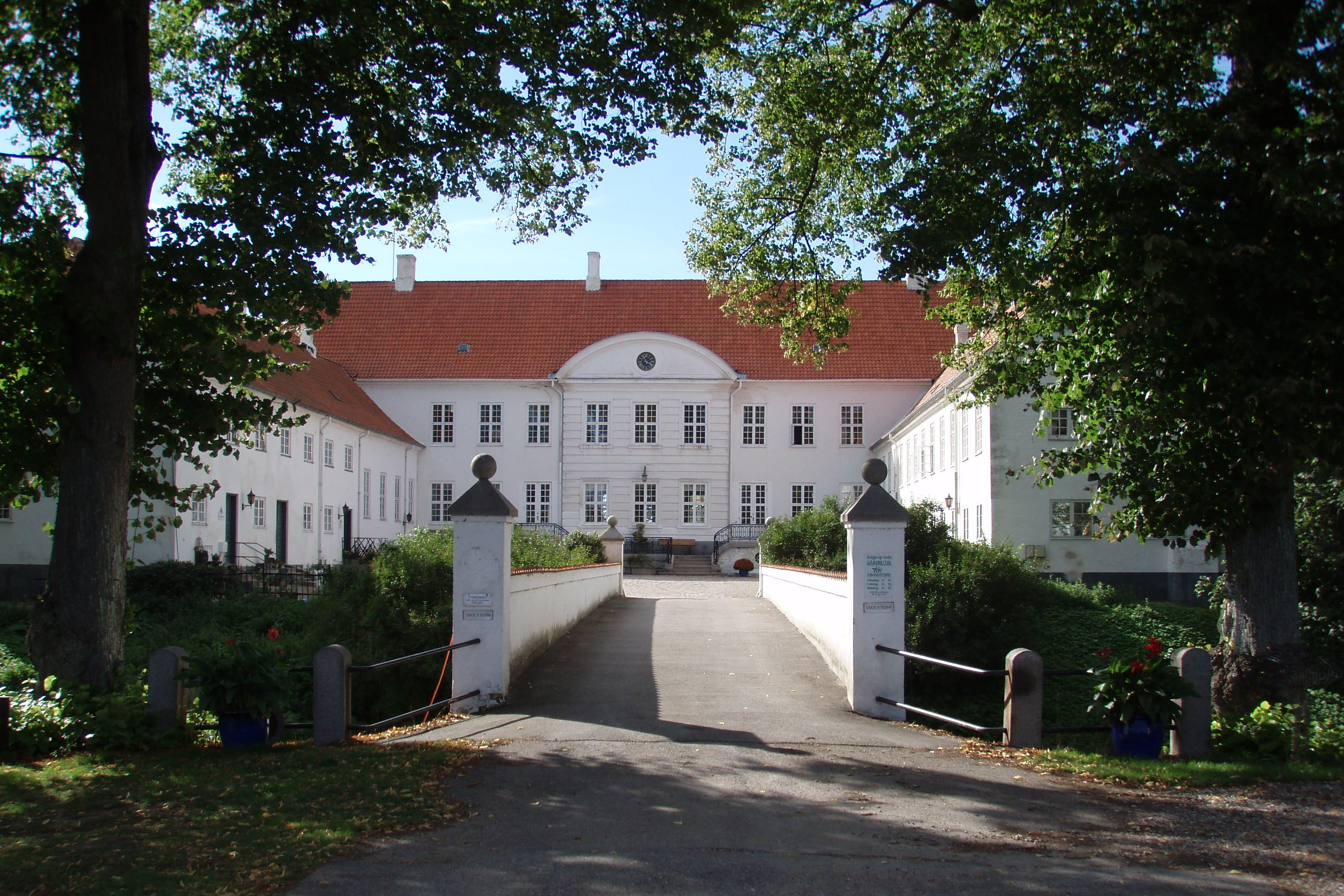
- Kragerup manorhouse
- Interactive map of the Kragerup area

General information
- Location: Ørslev Sogn, Kalundborg Kommune, Region Sjælland, Kragerupgårdsvej 33, 4291 Ruds-Vedby
- Coordinates: 55°30′36″N 11°22′48″E
- Owner: Birgitte Dinesen (since 1996)

Website
- kragerup.dk

Kragerup, also known as Kragerupgaard, is a manor house and estate located close to Høng, Kalundborg Municipality, some 90 kilometres southwest of Copenhagen, Denmark. The estate has been owned by the Dinesen family since 1801. The main building is now operated as a hotel. It was listed on the Danish registry of protected buildings and places in 1918.

== History ==
=== Early history ===
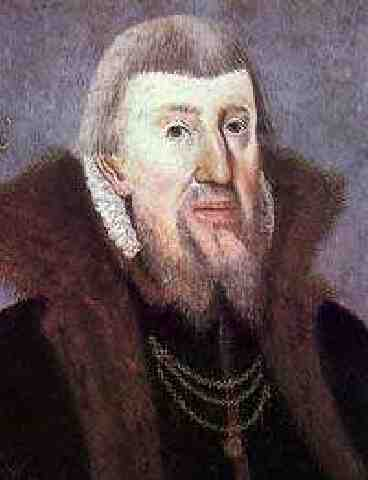
Peder Skram

In the Middle Ages, Kragerup was the name of a village with a farm by the same name. The name is first recorded as Krakæthorp in 1327, when it was owned by the nobleman Matheaus Jakobsen Taa. In 1356–1376, Kragerup belonged to Jens Nielsen Neb. After his death, ownership of the estate was spread out, with more than one simultaneous owner.

At some point, ownership of the estate was transferred to members of the Gyrsting family. Towards the end of the 15th century, Oluf Mortensen Gyrsting acquired almost full ownership of the estate. After his death in 1490, Kragerup was passed first to Eggert Andersen Ulfeldt (died 1505) and then to Peder Skram. In 1533, he sold Kragerup to his new father-in-law, Ove Lunge. Lunge's daughter Forthe was married to Claus Ulfeldt. After Lunge's death, Kragerup was passed to his grandson, Eggert Clausen Ulfedt. He was succeeded by his son Eggert Ulfeldt. He was married to Elisabeth Galde.

=== Friis family, c. 1590s–1656 ===
Elisabeth Ylfeldt (née Galde) brought Kragerup into her second marriage with Jørgen Friis til Knastrup.

Friis' son from a previous marriage, Christen Friis (1581–1639), inherited Kragerup in 1610. He served in the Kalmar War in 1611–1613 and was appointed chancellor in 1616. In 1621, he constructed a new main building, in a new location. It was a three-winged building situated on an isle in a lake just northwest of the village. He also increased the size of the estate by buying up farms in the surrounding villages. In 1627, Kragerup was awarded the status of a birk.

Frius' widow Barbara Wittrup kept the estate after her husband's death. In 1553, it was passed to their son Hans Friis til Clausholm.

=== Juul family, 1656–1705 ===
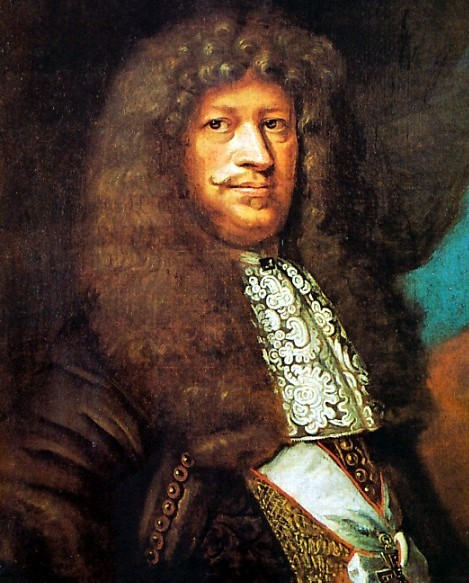
Ove Juul

Hans Friis sold Kragerup in 1656 to Frederik Urne. He was succeeded by his son-in-law, Ove Juul, who was later appointed vice chancellor. His other holdings included Lundbæk-Pandum, Villestrup, and Bregentved. Kragerup was later passed to his son, Christian Juul, who one year later ceded it to his sister, Mette Marie Juul. The estate Kattrup was also acquired by her. She married the bailiff on the estate, Povl Pedersen Lerskov, but he died in 1692. Mette Marie Juul stayed on the estate another 12 years.

=== Lerche, Fogh and Bech ===
In 1705, Kragerup was acquired by Jacob Lerche. He extended the estate with Kragevik (three farms) and Nyrop (four farms).

After his death in 1721, Kragerup was sold by auction for 25,000 Danish rigsdaler to regiment quartermaster Andreas Fogh (died 1762). He is credited as being the first potato grower on Zealand. His other initiatives included a wool factory and the establishment of carp ponds. The estate was later owned by his sons Lars Andreas Dogh, upon whose death, in 1764, it passed to the joint ownership of his brother (Clemens) and three sisters (Christine, Christine and Mette). Mette Andreas Gogh outlived her brother and two sisters. In 1797, she sold Kragerup to Peder Bech. The village of Kragerup disappeared in around 1800 when the farms were moved out on the fielfs.

=== Dinesen family ===
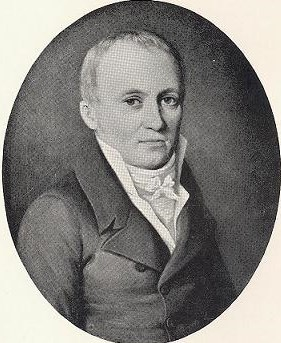
Jens Kraft Dinesen

In 1801, Kragerup was acquired by Jens Kraft Dinesen, who had sold Gyldenholm to Christopher Schøller Bülow the previous year. He constructed a new main wing in 1802.

Dinesen was succeeded by his son Anders Didrich Dinesen. He was married to Sophie Jacobine de Neergaard, a daughter of Johan Michael de Neergaard. She managed the estate with great skill after his death, but died at the age of 47 in 1857. Their son Jens Kraft Jacob Sophus Dinesen then inherited the estate. He married his younger brother's widow, Alvilde Dinesen, in 1880. Her son by her first husband, also called Jens Kraft Dinesen, inherited Kragerup in 1910. After his death in 1916 Kragerup was passed on to his son Wilhelm Dinesen.

== Architecture ==
The main building is a three-winged, two-storey complex with white-washed walls and a half-hipped red tile roof. The main wing to the west stands on a rise slightly above the two side wings. It is 15 bays wide and has a central risalit topped by a rounded pediment.

== Interior ==
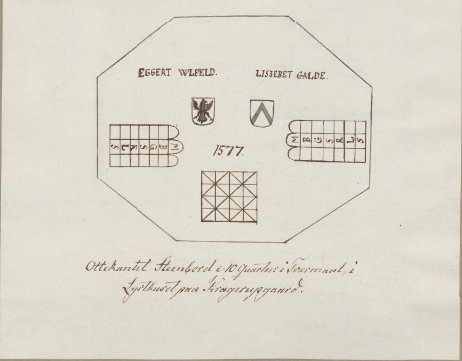
Baumann-Becker's drawing of Ulfeldt's octagonal table for board games

An octagonal table for board games executed in granite for Eggert Ylfeldt in 1577 has survived to the present day. It was used for alquerque. It features his and his wife's coats of arms. The table was installed in a small, thatched pavilion in the garden. Johann Gottfried Burman Becker drew it when he visited Kragerup.

A carved cupboard from the 17th century has also survived. It is now located in the hall.

== List of owners ==
- (1327– ) Matheus Jakobsen Taa
- (1356–1376) Jens Nielsen Neb
- ( – ) Henrik Jensen Neb
- ( – ) Jens Genvæther
- (1382– ) Hartvig Bryske
- ( – ) Birgitte Bryske
- ( – ) Herman v. Hahn
- ( – ) Christen Rud
- ( – ) Ulf Limbek
- ( – ) Jens Poulsen
- ( – ) Eskil Gøye
- ( – ) Claus Bryske
- ( – ) Navne Jensen Gyrsting
- (1445– ) Morten Jensen Gyrsting
- (1460– ) Folmer Mortensen Gyrsting
- (1468–1496) Oluf Mortensen Gyrsting
- (1481– ) Jørgen Rud
- (1505– ) Eggert Andersen Ulfeldt
- ( v1533) Peder Skram
- (1533– ) Ove Lunge
- ( – ) Claus Eggertsen Ulfeldt
- ( –1583) Eggert Ulfeldt
- (1583– ) Elisabeth Galde, married 1) Ulfeldt, 2) Friis
- ( –1610) Jørgen Friis
- (1610–1639) Christen Friis
- (1639–1653) Barbara Wittrup, married Friis
- (1653–1656) Hans Friis
- (1656–1658) Frederik Urne
- (1658–1686) Ove Juul
- (1686–1687) Christian Juul
- (1687– ) Mette Marie Juul, married Lerskov
- ( –1692) Poul Pedersen Lerskov
- (1692–1705) Mette Marie Juul, married Lerskov
- (1705–1721) Jacob Lerche
- (1721–1762) Andreas Fogh
- (1762–1774) Lars Fogh
- (1774–1794) Clemens Fogh
- (1774– ) Marie Fogh
- (1774– ) Mette Fogh
- (1794–1797) Christine Fogh
- (1797–1801) Peder Bech
- (1801–1827) Jens Kraft Dinesen
- (1827–1840) Anders Didrich Dinesen
- (1840–1857) Sophie Jacobine de Neergaard, married Dinesen
- (1857–1910) Jens Kraft Jacob Sophus Dinesen
- (1910–1916) Jens Kraft Dinesen
- (1916–1932) Wilhelm Dinesen
- (1932–1939) Ida Dinesen
- (1939–1963) Jørgen Dinesen
- (1963–1996) Erik S. Dinesen
- (1996– ) Birgitte Dinesen
