= Christian Rantzau =

Danish nobleman

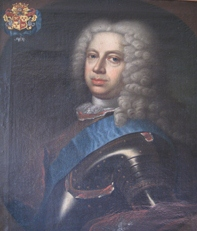
- 1909 portrait copy by Hans Christian Hansen Vantore

Governor-general of Norway
- In office 1731–1739
- Monarch: Christian VI
- Preceded by: Ditlev Vibe
- Succeeded by: Jacob Benzon

Personal details
- Born: 23 January 1684 Copenhagen, Denmark
- Died: 16 April 1771 (aged 87) Brahesborg, Denmark
- Awards: Order of the Elephant, 1731

Christian Rantzau (23 January 1684 – 16 April 1771) was a Danish nobleman and civil servant. He served as Governor-general of Norway from 1731 to 1739.

== Biography ==
Rantzau was born at Copenhagen, Denmark as son of Otto Rantzau (1632–1719), third lensgreve of Rosenvold, and Sophie Amalie Krag af Jylland (1648–1710). He became 5th lensgreve of Rosenvold in 1726, succeeding his brother Frederik Rantzau (1677–1726). He owned besides Rosenvold, estates at Asdal, Brahesborg, Hammelmose, Krengerup and Skovgaard.

In his youth he was on an educational journey in Europe. In 1702 he studied at the Knight Academy (Det ridderlige Akademi) in Copenhagen. In 1713 he became a commissioner in the Naval General War Commission. Rantzau was dismissed in 1721. In 1726, he received a seat on the commission to investigate the conditions of the Danish-Norwegian Royal Navy.

He was appointed vice Steward of Norway, in 1731 after recently deceased Ditlev Vibe (1670–1731). During King Christian VI voyage to Norway in 1733, Rantzau played a major role; he accompanied the court of the King to Trondheim. In 1739, his office was rescinded and remained vacant until 1750. The reason for why Rantzaus was deposed was because of his wild lifestyle, and the pietist King Christian VI did not approve of his way of living and deposed him as his Steward of Norway.

In 1740, he succeeded Christian Christophersen Sehested as county governor of Odense and several counties. He lived at St. Canute's Abbey (Skt Knuds Kloster) among the largest buildings in Odense. For 20 years he governed his counties, resigning in 1760. He died during 1771 at Brahesborg in Fyn.

== Personal life ==
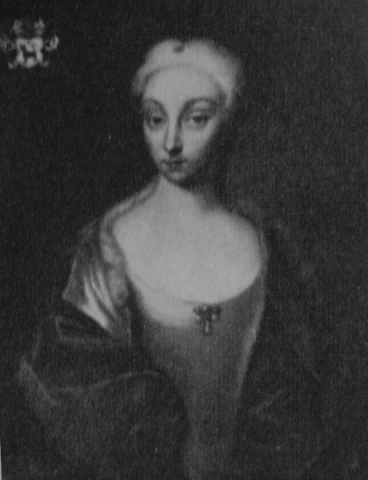
Eleonore Hedevig Scheel von Plessen.

Rantzau married Charlotte Amalie Goeye (1689–1724) in 1716 and after her death married Eleonore Scheel-von Plessen (1708–1770) in 1726. Had from first marriage Otto Mandrup Rantzau (1719–1768); from second marriage Christian Rantzau (1730–1765), Friedrich Siegfried Rantzau (1744–1822) and Carl Adolf Rantzau (1742–1814). Rantzau was also a great collector of books, and he had over 3600 books in his collection. Unfortunately he became insane in his last years, and destroyed a lot of the collection, including old monastic books from the Middle Ages.
