= Caspar Martin Schøller =

Danish county governor

Caspar Martin Schøller (16 August 1681 – 6 May 1756) was a Danish nobleman and county governor of Vordingborg County.

== Early life and education ==
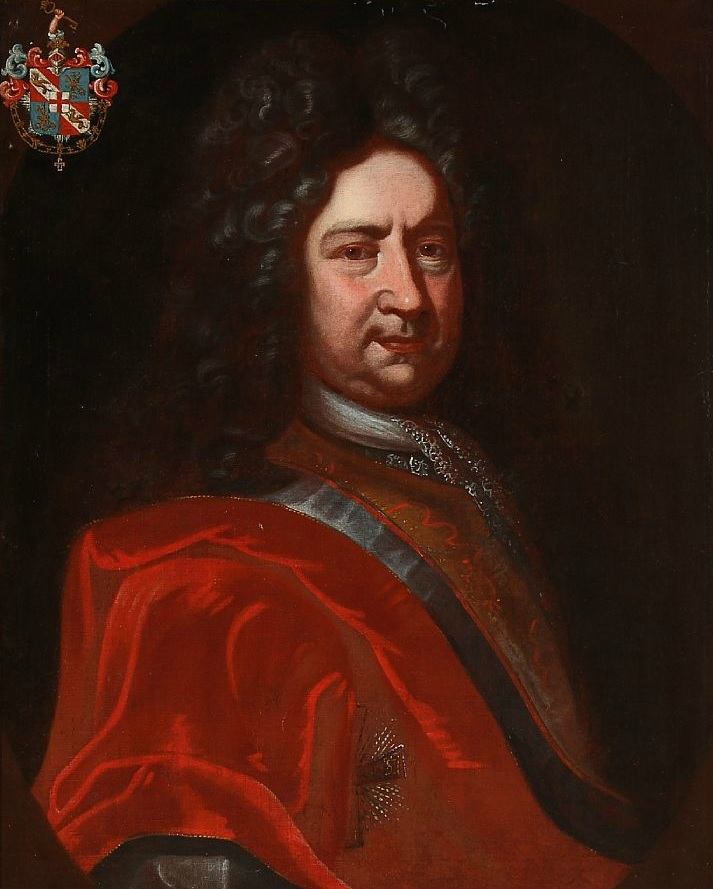
Schøller's father, Caspar Schøller.

Schøller was born on 16 August 1681, the son of Geheimeraad Caspar Schøller and Johanne Thune. His father was a Supreme Court justice and the owner of the estates Spanager and Lellinge, at Køge. His paternal grandfather was burgermaster of Køge. Spanager was sold when his father died in 1719, In the following year, his mother sold Lellinge to Anne Sophie Reventlow.

== Career ==
Schøller attended the Det ridderlige Akademi (Knight's Academy) in Copenhagen. In 1704, he visited the Netherlands and France with Niels Benzon as his hofmester. On 30 August 1713, he was appointed as kammerjunker (court page). He was later promoted to kammerjunker. On 25 September 1719, he succeeded Christoffer Joachim Giese as county governor of Vordingborg County. On 30 January 1722, he was awarded the title of etatsråd. On 30 November 1631, he was awarded the title of jinferensråd. On 27 September 1748, he was dismissed from the post as county governor.

== Personal life ==
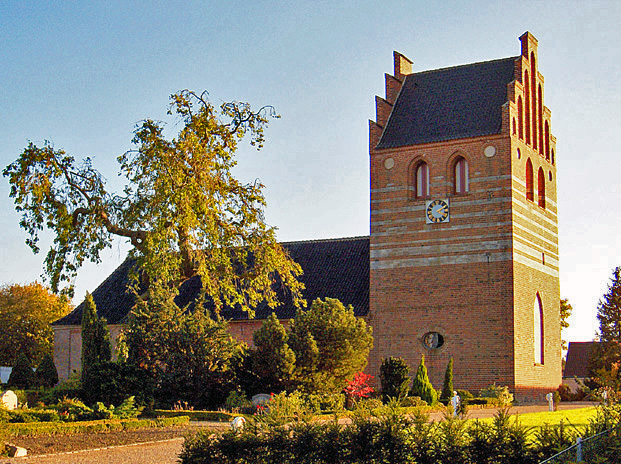
Lellinge Church where Schøller is buried

Schøller was married to Charlotte Amalie Bøfke (1693–1741) on 12 September 1708. She was a daughter of county governor Hans von Bøfke and Anna Marie Ehrenschild.

Schøller died on 5 May 1768. He is buried in the Schøller family's burial chapel in Lellinge Church.

Civic offices
Preceded by Christoffer Joachim Giese	County Governor of Vordingborg County; 1719–1748	Succeeded by Gideon van der Lühe
