= Governor-General of Norway =

Head of state in absence of the monarch

Governor-general of Norway
- Rigsstatholder (Danish); Riksståthållare (Swedish)
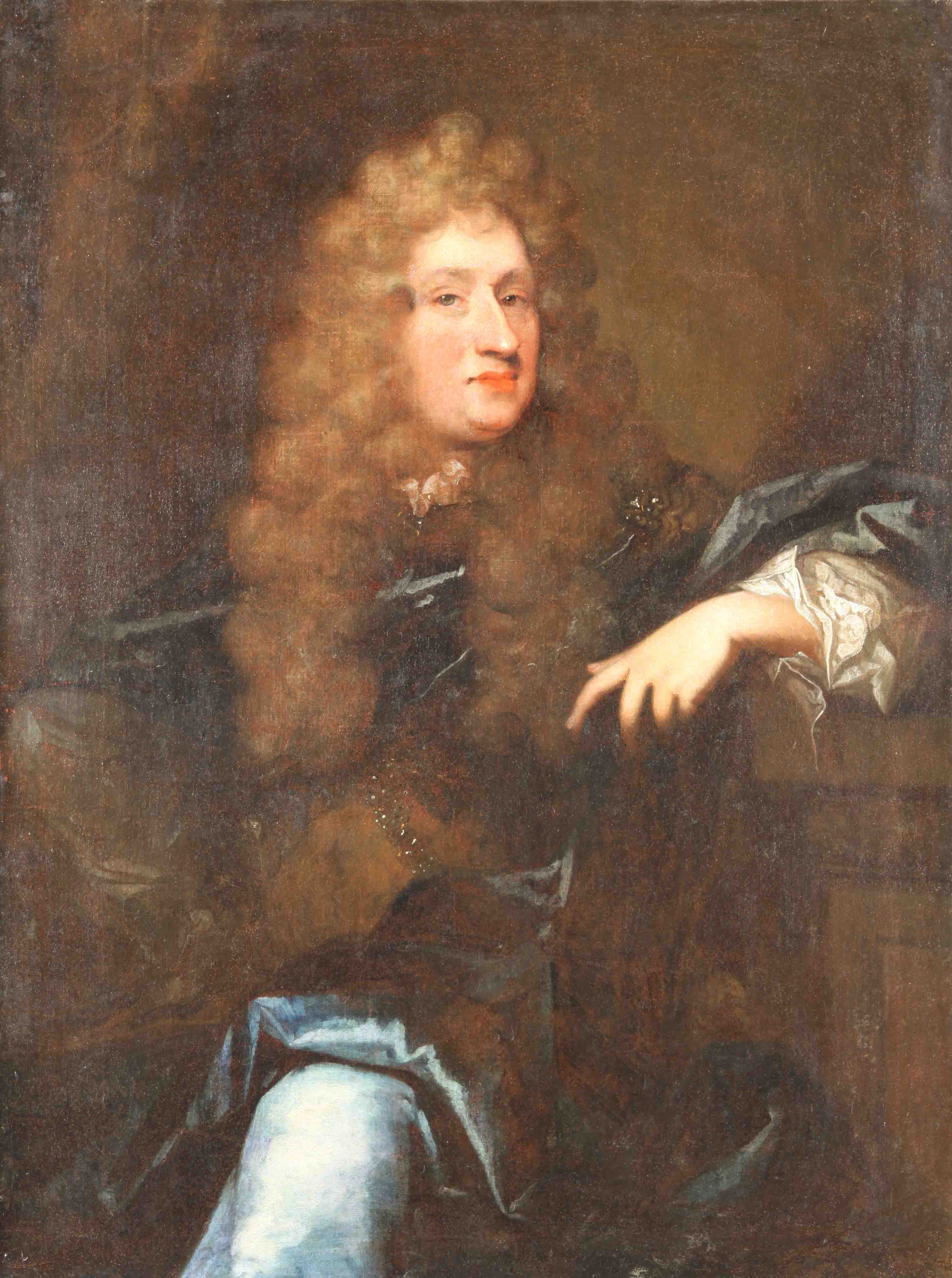
- Longest serving Ulrik Frederik Gyldenløve; 1664–1699
- Appointer: The King
- Term length: At His Majesty's pleasure
- Formation: 1556
- First holder: Christen Munk
- Final holder: Severin Løvenskiold
- Abolished: 1873

The governor-general of Norway (Danish: Rigsstatholder; Swedish: Riksståthållare, both meaning 'lieutenant of the realm', see stadtholder) was the appointed head of the Norwegian Government in the absence of the monarch, during the union with Denmark and with Sweden.

== Etymology ==
(Norwegian: Stattholder) means "steward". Its component parts literally translate as "place holder," or as a direct cognate, "stead holder", it was a term for a "steward" or "lieutenant". However, this is not the word for the military rank of lieutenant, which is løytnant in Norwegian.

== Governors-general (Denmark–Norway) ==
The office of Governor-general of Norway was established in 1556 and was occupied with occasional interruptions until 1814. The governor-general was normally at the same time Lensherre (Governor) of Akershus len (after 1662; Akershus amt), and was the highest authority in the country.

=== List of officeholders ===
| No. | Portrait | Name (born–died) | Term of office | | | Monarch(s) | Ref. |
| No. | Portrait | Name (born–died) | Took office | Left office | Time in office | Monarch(s) | Ref. |
|---|---|---|---|---|---|---|---|
| - | Christen Munk | Christen Munk (c. 1520–1579) | 1556 | 1572 | 15–16 years | Christian III; Frederick II | |
| 1 | Pouel Ottesen Huitfeldt | Pouel Ottesen Huitfeldt (c. 1529–1592) | 1572 | 1577 | 4–5 years | Frederick II | |
| 2 | Ludvig Munk | Ludvig Munk (c. 1532–1602) | 9 July 1577 | 1583 | 5–6 years | Frederick II | |
Office vacant (1583–1588)
| 3 | Axel Gyldenstjerne | Axel Gyldenstjerne (c. 1542–1603) | 1588 | 1601 | 12–13 years | Christian IV | |
| 4 | Jørgen Friis | Jørgen Friis (c. 1543–1616) | 1601 | 1608 | 6–7 years | Christian IV | |
| 5 | Enevold Kruse | Enevold Kruse (c. 1554–1621) | 1608 | 1618 | 9–10 years | Christian IV | |
| 6 | Jens Hermansson Juel | Jens Hermansson Juel (1580–1634) | 1618 | 1629 | 10–11 years | Christian IV | |
| 7 | Christoffer Urne | Christoffer Urne (1593–1663) | 1629 | 1642 | 12–13 years | Christian IV | |
| 8 | Hannibal Sehested | Hannibal Sehested (1609–1666) | 1642 | 24 June 1651 | 8–9 years | Christian IV; Frederick III | |
| 9 | Gregers Krabbe | Gregers Krabbe (1594–1655) | 1651 | 20 December 1655 | 3–4 years | Frederick III | |
| 10 | Niels Trolle | Niels Trolle (1599–1667) | 1656 | 28 March 1661 | 4–5 years | Frederick III | |
| 11 | Iver Krabbe | Iver Krabbe (1602–1666) | 8 October 1661 | 1664 | 2–3 years | Frederick III | |
| 12 | Ulrik Frederik Gyldenløve | Ulrik Frederik Gyldenløve (1638–1704) | January 1664 | 1699 | 34–35 years | Frederick III; Christian V | |
| 13 | Frederik Gabel | Frederik Gabel (c. 1640–1708); Vice governor-general | 30 September 1699 | 1708 | 8–9 years | Frederick IV | |
| 14 | Johan Vibe | Johan Vibe (1634–1710); Vice governor-general | 10 April 1708 | 22 February 1710 | 1 year, 318 days | Frederick IV | |
| 15 | Woldemar Løvendal | Woldemar Løvendal (1660–1740) | 1 August 1710 | 30 April 1712 | 1 year, 273 days | Frederick IV | |
| 16 | Claus Henrik Vieregg | Claus Henrik Vieregg (1655–1713); Vice Governor-general | 4 August 1712 | 14 July 1713 | 344 days | Frederick IV | |
| 17 | Frederik Krag | Frederik Krag (1655–1728); Vice governor-general | 19 September 1713 | 1722 | 8–9 years | Frederick IV | |
| 18 | Ditlev Vibe | Ditlev Vibe (1670–1731) | 17 April 1722 | 5 October 1731 | 9 years, 171 days | Frederick IV; Christian VI | |
| 19 | Christian Rantzau | Christian Rantzau (1684–1771) | 1731 | 1739 | 7–8 years | Christian VI | |
Office vacant (1739–1750)
| 20 | Jacob Benzon | Jacob Benzon (1688–1775); Vice Governor-general (1750-1770); Governor-general (1770-1771) | 11 September 1750 | 8 February 1771 | 20 years, 150 days | Frederick V Christian VII | |
| - | Prince Charles of Hesse-Kassel | Prince Charles of Hesse-Kassel (1744–1836); Acting | 4 July 1766 | January 1768 | 1 year | Christian VII | |
Office vacant (8 February 1771 – 25 July 1809)
| 21 | Charles August, Crown Prince of Sweden | Charles August, Crown Prince of Sweden (1768–1810) | 25 July 1809 | 11 January 1810 | 170 days | Frederick VI | |
| 22 | Prince Frederik of Hesse | Prince Frederik of Hesse (1771–1845) | 11 January 1810 | 11 May 1813 | 3 years, 120 days | Frederick VI | |
| 23 | Christian Frederik of Denmark | Christian Frederik of Denmark (1786–1848) | 11 May 1813 | 16 February 1814 | 281 days | Frederick VI | |

== Governors-general (Sweden–Norway) ==
The following describes the office of governor as it was from 1814 during the union with Sweden:

The office came into existence by the Norwegian Constitution, of 4 November 1814 where the paragraphs 12, 13 and 15 stipulated that a governor-general of Swedish or Norwegian nationality could be appointed. The governor-general resided in Christiania (today Oslo) and led the Government in the absence of the monarch, when he resided in his Swedish capital Stockholm. The Council was normally led by the governor-general, who had two votes, unless the monarch was present, at which point he would lose his authority and merely become the first among equals, or prime minister of the council.

The post was held by Swedish appointees from 1814 until 1829, when it was vacated by natural causes. Protests left the position empty until 1836, when it was filled by a Norwegian appointee. He was succeeded in 1841 but the successor Severin Løvenskiold laid down his office in 1856, after which it would not be reinstated. The demand to abandon the office completely was ultimately granted in 1873 by King Oscar II.

=== List of officeholders ===
| No. | Portrait | Name (born–died) | Term of office | | | Monarch(s) | Ref. |
| No. | Portrait | Name (born–died) | Took office | Left office | Time in office | Monarch(s) | Ref. |
|---|---|---|---|---|---|---|---|
| 1 | Count Hans Henric von Essen | Count Hans Henric von Essen (1755–1824) | 1814 | 1816 | 1–2 years | Charles XIII & II | |
| 2 | Count Carl Carlsson Mörner | Count Carl Carlsson Mörner (1755–1821) | 1816 | 1818 | 1–2 years | Charles XIII & II | |
| 3 | Count Johan August Sandels | Count Johan August Sandels (1764–1831) | 1818 | 1827 | 8–9 years | Charles XIV & III John | |
| 4 | Count Baltzar von Platen | Count Baltzar von Platen (1766–1829) | 1827 | 1829 | 1–2 years | Charles XIV & III John | |
Office vacant (1829 – 1836)
| 5 | Count Johan Caspar Herman Wedel-Jarlsberg | Count Johan Caspar Herman Wedel-Jarlsberg (1779–1840) | 1836 | 1840 | 3–4 years | Charles XIV & III John | |
Office vacant (1840 – 1841)
| 6 | Severin Løvenskiold | Severin Løvenskiold (1777–1856) | 1841 | 1856 | 14–15 years | Charles XIV & III John; Oscar I | |
Office vacant (1856 – 1873) Then it was abolished

== See also ==
- List of Norwegian monarchs
- List of Norwegian Prime Ministers
- Union between Sweden and Norway

== Sources and references ==
- WorldStatesmen – Norway
- Statholderembetet 1572–1771
