= Peder Griffenfeld =

Danish statesman (1635–1699)

Count Peder Griffenfeld
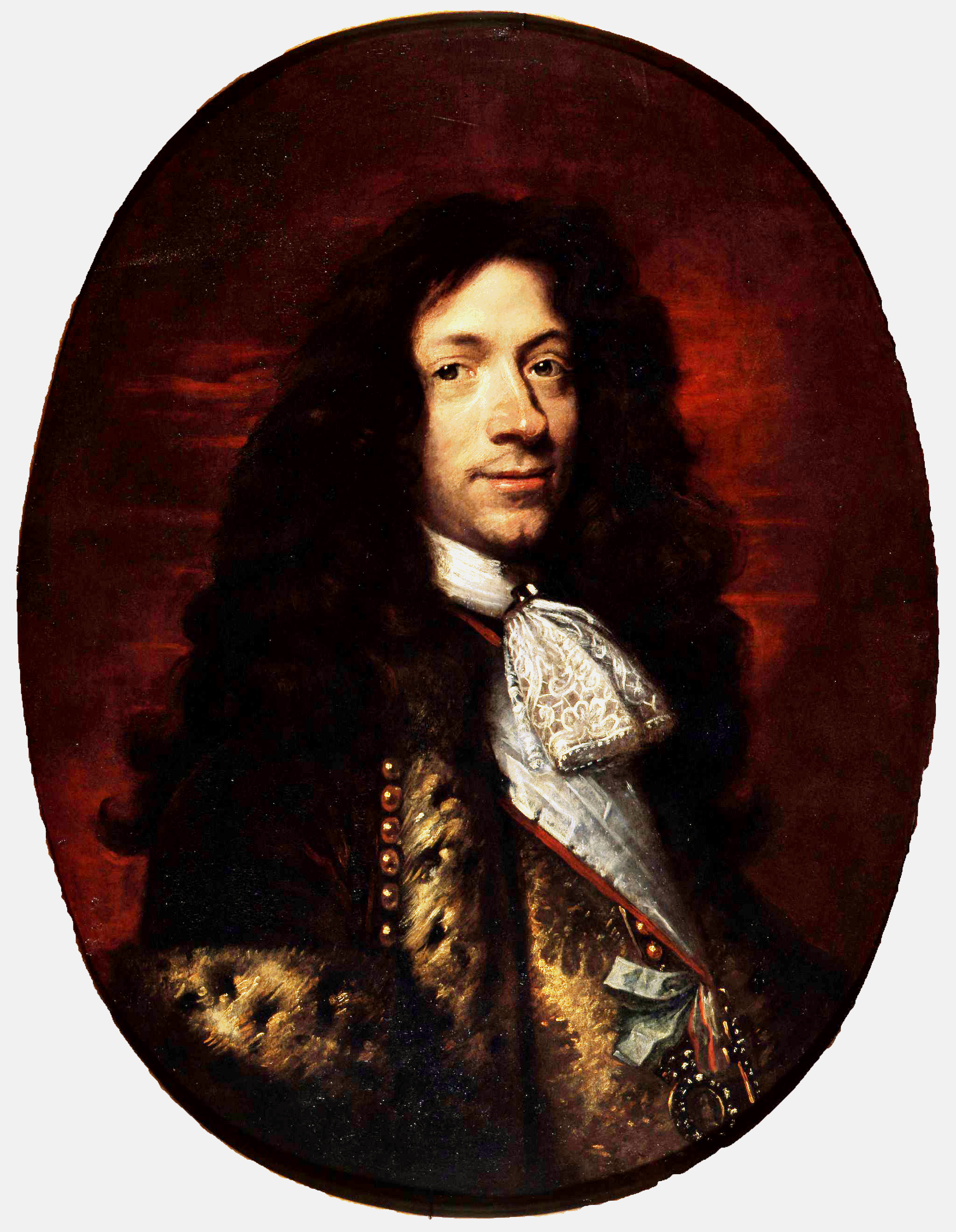
- Peder Schumacher portrayed by Abraham Wuchters in 1672

Chancellor of Denmark
- In office November 1673 – 12 March 1699

Personal details
- Born: 24 August 1635 Copenhagen, Denmark
- Died: 12 March 1699 (aged 63) Munkholmen, Norway

Count Peder Griffenfeld (before ennoblement Peder Schumacher) (24 August 1635 – 12 March 1699) was a Danish statesman and royal favourite. He became the principal adviser to King Christian V of Denmark from 1670 and the de facto ruler of the dual kingdom of Denmark-Norway in the first half of the 1670s. In 1673 he was appointed as Chancellor of Denmark, elevated to count, the highest aristocratic rank in Denmark-Norway, and received the Order of the Elephant, the country's highest order. At the behest of his enemies at court, Griffenfeld was arrested in early 1676 and convicted of treason, a charge that historians agree was false. He was imprisoned for 22 years, mainly at Munkholmen in Norway.

== Early years ==
Born in Copenhagen into a wealthy trading family connected with the leading civic, clerical and learned circles in the Danish capital, he was prepared for university (at the age of ten) by Jens Vorde. Vorde praises his extraordinary gifts, his mastery of the classical languages and his unnerving diligence. The brilliance he showed in his preliminary examination won him the friendship of the examiner, Bishop Jesper Brochmand, at whose palace he first met King Frederick III of Denmark. The king was struck with Schumacher; and Brokman, proud of his pupil, made him translate a chapter from a Hebrew Bible first into Latin and then into Danish, for the entertainment of the scholarly monarch.

In 1654 young Schumacher went abroad for eight years, to complete his education. From Germany he proceeded to the Netherlands, staying at Leiden, Utrecht and Amsterdam, and passing in 1657 to Queen's College, Oxford, where he spent three years. The epoch-making events that occurred in England while he was at Oxford profoundly interested him. Coinciding with the Revolution in Denmark, which threw open a career to the middle classes, it convinced him that his future was in politics. In the autumn of 1660 Schumacher visited Paris, shortly after Cardinal Mazarin's death, when the young King Louis XIV first seized the reins of power in France. Schumacher seems to have been profoundly impressed by the administrative superiority of a strong centralised monarchy in the hands of an energetic monarch who knew his own mind; and, in politics, as in manners, France ever afterwards was his model. The last year of his travels was spent in Spain, where he obtained a thorough knowledge of the Castilian language and literature. He is said to have brought home easy morals as well as exquisite manners.

== Career ==
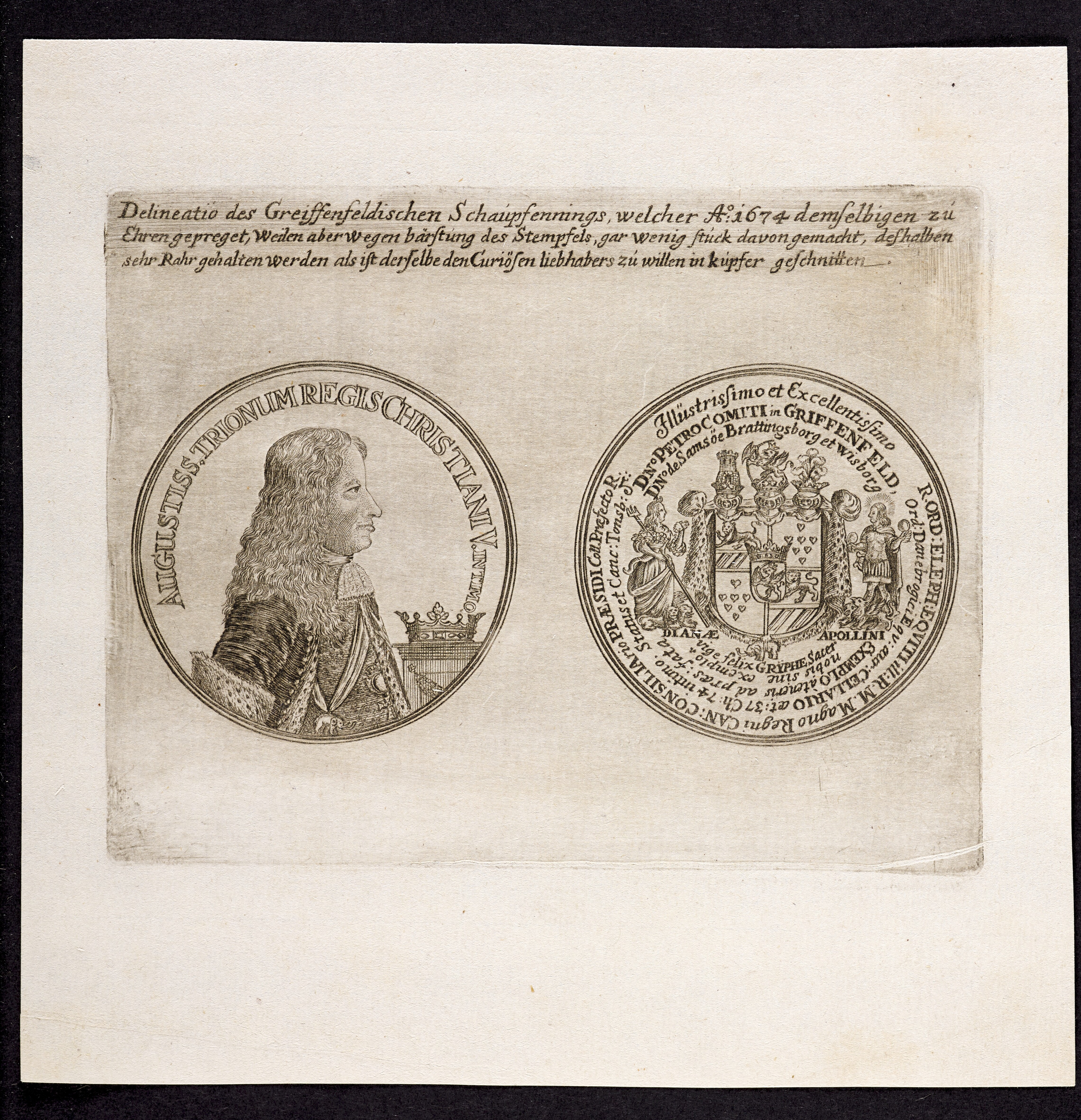
Delineatio des Greiffeldischen Schaupfennings.

On his return to Copenhagen, in 1662, Schumacher found the monarchy established on the ruins of the aristocracy, and eager to buy the services of every man of the middle classes who had superior talents to offer. The young adventurer contrived to secure the protection of Kristoffer Gabel, the king's confidant, and in 1663 was appointed the royal librarian. A romantic friendship with the king's natural son, Count Ulric Frederick Gyldenløve, consolidated his position. In 1665 Schumacher obtained his first political post as the king's secretary, and the same year composed the memorable King's Law (Lex Regia). He was now a personage at court, where he won many over by his amiability and gaiety; and in political matters also his influence was beginning to be felt. During these years, he had a notorious love affair with Mette Trolle

On the death of Frederick III (9 February 1670) Schumacher was the most trusted of all the royal counsellors. He alone was aware of the existence of the new throne of walrus ivory embellished with three silver life-size lions, and of the new regalia, both of which treasures he had, by the king's command, concealed in a vault beneath the royal castle. Frederick III had also confided to him a sealed packet containing the King's Law, which was to be delivered to his successor alone. Schumacher had been recommended to his son by Frederick III on his deathbed. "Make him a great man, but do it slowly," said Frederick, who thoroughly understood the characters of his son and of his minister. Christian V was, moreover, deeply impressed by the confidence which his father had ever shown to Schumacher. When, on 9 February 1670, Schumacher delivered the King's Law to Christian V, the king bade all those about him withdraw, and after being closeted for a good hour with Schumacher appointed him his Obergeheimesekreter (principal private secretary).

His promotion was rapid. In May 1670 he received the titles of excellency and privy councillor; in July of the same year he was ennobled under the name of Griffenfeld, deriving his title from the gold griffin with outspread wings which surmounted his escutcheon; in November 1673 the title of count was bestowed upon him and he also became a knight of the Order of the Elephant and, finally, imperial chancellor. In the course of the next few months he gathered into his hands every branch of the government: he had reached the apogee of his short-lived greatness.

Frederick III was influenced by literary works and theoretical discussions, while Christian V was supported through administrative assistance and decision-making that maintained the appearance of his own autonomy. Furthermore, Frederick III possessed organizational skills that affected various state departments and demonstrated flexibility in diplomatic roles.

On 25 May 1671 the dignities of count and baron were introduced into Denmark-Norway; a few months later the Order of the Dannebrog was instituted as a fresh means of winning adherents by marks of favour. Griffenfeld was the originator of these new institutions. To him monarchy was the ideal form of government. But he had also a political object. The aristocracy of birth, despite its reverses, still remained the elite of society; and Griffenfeld, the son of a burgess, was its most determined enemy. The new baronies and countships, owing their existence entirely to the crown, introduced a strong solvent into aristocratic circles. Griffenfeld saw that, in future, the first at court would be the first everywhere. Much was also done to promote trade and industry, notably by the revival of the Kammer Kollegium, or board of trade, and the abolition of some of the most harmful monopolies. Both the higher and the provincial administrations were thoroughly reformed with the view of

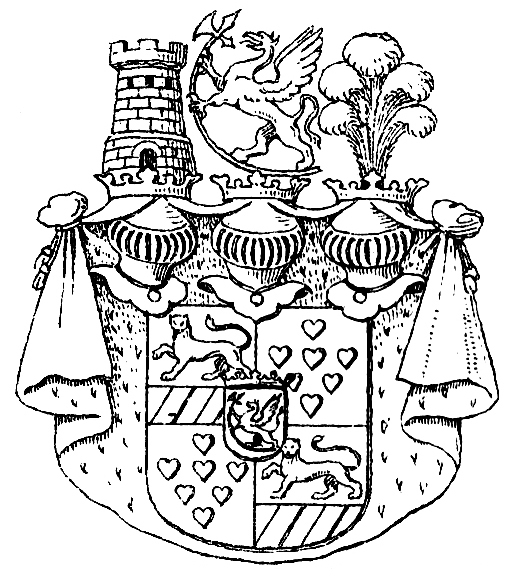
Coat of arms of Griffenfeld.

making them more centralized and efficient; and the positions and duties of the various magistrates, who now also received fixed salaries, were for the first time exactly defined. But what Griffenfeld could create, Griffenfeld could dispense with, and it was not long before he began to encroach upon the jurisdiction of the new departments of state by private conferences with their chiefs. Nevertheless, it is indisputable that, under the single direction of this mastermind, the Danish state was now able, for a time, to utilize all its resources as it had never done before.

In the last three years of his administration, Griffenfeld gave himself entirely to the conduct of the foreign policy of Denmark-Norway. It is difficult to form a clear idea of this, first, because his influence was perpetually traversed by opposite tendencies; in the second place, because the force of circumstances compelled him, again and again, to shift his standpoint; and finally because personal considerations largely intermingled with his foreign policy, and made it more elusive and ambiguous than it need have been. Briefly, Griffenfeld aimed at restoring Denmark to the rank of a great power. He proposed to accomplish this by carefully nursing its resources, and in the meantime securing and enriching the country through alliances, which would bring in large subsidies while imposing a minimum of obligations. Such a conditional and tentative policy, in a period of universal tension and turmoil, was most difficult; but Griffenfeld did not regard it as impossible.

The first demand of such a policy was peace, especially peace with Denmark-Norway's most dangerous neighbour, Sweden. The second postulate was a sound financial basis, which he expected the wealth of France to supply in the shape of subsidies to be spent on armaments. Above all things Denmark-Norway was to beware of making enemies of France and Sweden at the same time. An alliance, on fairly equal terms, between the three powers, would, in these circumstances, be the consummation of Griffenfeld's system; an alliance with France to the exclusion of Sweden would be the next best policy; but an alliance between France and Sweden, without the admission of Denmark, was to be avoided at all hazards. Had Griffenfeld's policy succeeded, Denmark might have recovered her ancient possessions to the south and east comparatively cheaply. But again and again he was overruled. Despite his open protests and subterraneous counter-mining, war was actually declared against Sweden in 1675, and his subsequent policy seemed so obscure and hazardous to those who did not possess the clue to the perhaps purposely tangled skein, that the numerous enemies whom his arrogance and superciliousness had raised up against him, resolved to destroy him.

== Trial ==
On 11 March 1676, while on his way to the royal apartments, Griffenfeld was arrested in the king's name and taken to the citadel, a prisoner of state. A minute scrutiny of his papers, lasting nearly six weeks, revealed nothing treasonable; but it provided the enemies of the fallen statesman with a deadly weapon against him in the shape of an entry in his private diary, in which he had imprudently noted that on one occasion Christian V in a conversation with a foreign ambassador had spoken like a child. On 3 May, Griffenfeld was tried not by the customary tribunal, in such cases the Højesteret, or supreme court, but by an extraordinary tribunal of 10 dignitaries, none of whom was particularly well disposed towards the accused. Griffenfeld, who was charged with simony, bribery, oath-breaking, malversation and lèse-majesté, conducted his own defence under every imaginable difficulty.

For forty-six days before his trial he had been closely confined in a dungeon, without lights, books or writing materials. Every legal assistance was illegally denied him. Nevertheless, he proved more than a match for the prosecution. Finally, he was condemned to degradation and decapitation; though one of the ten judges not only refused to sign the sentence, but remonstrated in private with the king against its injustice. The primary offence of the ex-chancellor was the taking of bribes, which no twisting of the law could convert into a capital offence, while the charge of treason had not been substantiated.

Griffenfeld was pardoned on the scaffold, at the very moment when the axe was about to descend. On hearing that the sentence was commuted to lifelong imprisonment, he declared that the pardon was harder than the punishment, and vainly petitioned for leave to serve his king for the rest of his life as a common soldier. For the next twenty-two years Denmark-Norways's greatest statesman was a lonely prisoner, first in the fortress of Copenhagen, in Denmark and finally at Munkholmen in Trondheim Fjord, in Norway, where he died. Griffenfeld had married Kitty Nansen, the granddaughter of the great Burgomaster Hans Nansen, who brought him half a million rixdollars. She died in 1672, after bearing him a daughter. Griffenfeld and his wife are both buried at Vær Kirke in Århus Diocese

Griffenfeldsgade, a street in Nørrebro, Copenhagen, as well as Griffenfeld Island in Southeast Greenland, were named after him.

== See also ==
- Jørgen Fogh
