= Frederik de Løvenørn =

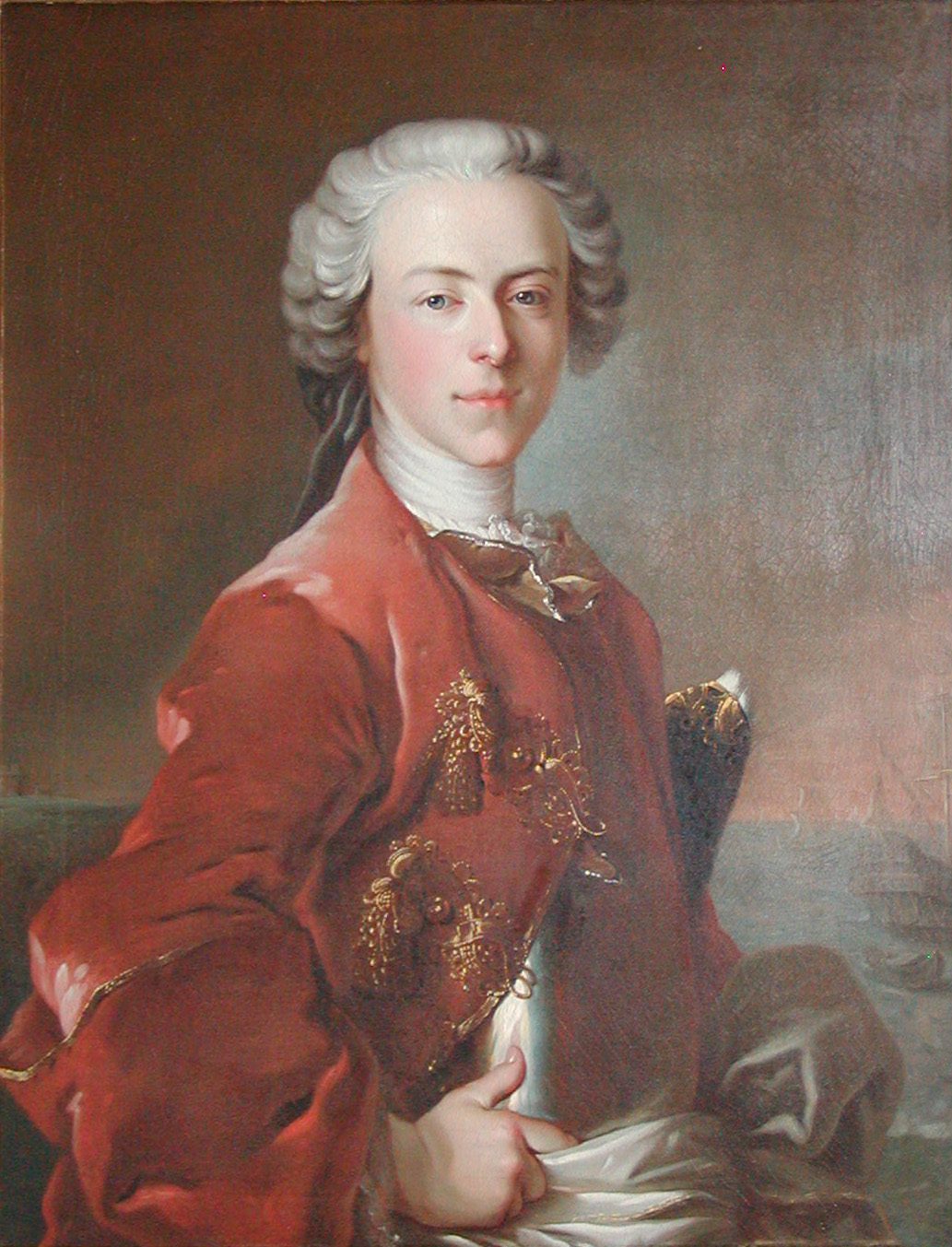
Frederik de Løvenørn painted by Louis Tocqué.

Frederik de Løvenørn (6 January 1715 – 15 October 1779) was a Danish naval officer who later served as county governor of Antvorskov and Jorsør counties.

== Early life and background ==
Løvenørn was born on 6 January 1715, the son of Poul Vendelbo Løvenørn and Ingeborg Vinding. His father bought Bregentved Manor from the king on very favourable conditions in 1721. In the 1730s, he served as Secretary of War and Minister of the Navy.

== Career ==
Løvenørn became naval officer in 1734. On 4 March 1740, he reached the rank of commander captain. In 1740, he also inherited Bregentved from his father but sold the estate back to the king the same year. In the same year, he was also appointed a Supreme Court justice. On 26 November 1746, he was appointed councillor (deputeret) in the Admiralitets- og Kommissariats-Kollegium. On 15 September 1747, he was awarded the title of Konferensraad. From 11 August 1751 until his death, he served as county governor of Antvorskov and Korsør counties.

== Personal life ==
Løvenørn was married to Frederikke Sofie von Holsten (1718—1774) on 4 November 1740. She was a daughter of colonel Gerhard Ditlev Holsten til Langesø and Elisabeth Sofie Knuth. They were the parents of Poul de Løvenørn.

Civic offices
Preceded by Villum Berregaard	County Governor of AntvorskovCounty; 1751—1779	Succeeded by Carl Adolph Raben
Preceded by Villum Berregaard	County Governor of Korsør County; 1751—1779	Succeeded by Carl Adolph Raben
