= Korsør County =

Former Danish county

Korsør County (Danish: Korsør Amt) is a former Danish county on southwestern Zealand. It was named for the town of Korsør.

== History ==
Korsør County was established in 1662 as a replacement of the old Korsør Fief (Korsør Len). During the 1793 Danish County Reform, together with Ringsted and Antvorskov counties, it was merged into Sorø County.

== List of coiunty governors ==
Portrait	Name	Term
	Hugo Lützow	1656–1693
	Hans Bøfkc	1693–1694
	Claus Henrik Vieregg	1694–1703
	Christian Vind	1704–1712
	Johan Frederik Thillemann	1712–1713
	Gottschalck Ernst von Bülow	1713–1716
	Heinrich Leopold vom Schindel	1716–1723
	Simon Henrik von Donop	1723–1727
	Frederik Rostgaard	1727–1730
	Christian Hans von Warnstedt	1730–1734
	Christian Berregaard	1734–1741
	Villum Berregaard	1741–1751
	Frederik de Løvenørn	1751–1779
	Wolf Veit Christoph von Reitzenstein (acting)	1773–1780
	Carl Adolf Raben	1780–1781
	Esajas Fleischer	1781–1785
	Vilhelm Mathias Skeel	1785–1798
	Poul Christian Stemann	1798–1803
