= Frederik Gabel =

Danish-Norwegian nobleman

Frederik Gabel (1645–1708) was a Danish-Norwegian nobleman who served as Vice Governor-general of Norway from 1699 until his death in 1708.

== Biography ==
Frederik Gabel was the son of Christoffer Gabel (1617–1673) who held the trade monopoly for the Faroe Islands. From 1667 through 1685 he served as a diplomatic envoy in Paris and Moscow. He married Anne Cathrine Juul on 25 April 1671 in Christiania (now Oslo), Norway. She was the daughter of former Vice Governor-general of Norway Ove Juel (1615–1686).

Gabel promoted a relatively progressive viewpoint, promoting increased separation between the administration in Denmark and that in Norway. Ulrik Frederik Gyldenløve had been Governor-general of Norway from 1664 through 1699, but served much of that time in Denmark, relying on his Vice Governors, Ove Juul and Just Justesen Høeg (1640-1694). Based on his kinship to the king, Gyldenløve, as with Hannibal Sehested before him, had held substantial powers to act freely in Norway. Gabel was authorized extended powers when compared with his immediate predecessor, Just Høeg, but notably less freedom of action than Gyldenløve. Gabel drafted guidelines based on management principles to guide his stewardship of both the King's land and the country of Norway and proposed them to the King in a letter dated 11 September 1700.

During the severe fire in Bergen in 1702, Gabel was present. He witnessed the obvious class hatred as the proletariat did nothing while the houses of the wealthy burned. After investigation, he concluded that great inequities had developed as the upper class had taken powers to themselves. He took those action he could, but lacking the power to act as broadly as he'd like by himself, he wrote letters to the King proposing reforms to reduce the class divide.

He died in Copenhagen on June 21, 1708. He was buried in St. Petri Church in Copenhagen. He was succeeded as Governor-general of Norway by Johan Vibe (1634–1710).
