= Carl Adolph Raben =

Court official and county governor

Carl Adolph Raben (1744–1784) was a Danish court official, county governor and landowner. He owned the estates Næsbyholm and Bavelse.

== Early life ==
Raben was born on 27 October 1744, the son of Christian Frederik Raben and Berte von Piessen.

== Career ==
In 1760, he became court page (Kammerjunker. In 1665, he became an assistant in Rentekammeret. In 1765, he became kammerjunker for queen Caroline Matilda. In 1768, he created chamberlain (kammerherre). In 1774, he became lord chamberlain (Hofmarskal) for Frederick. From 28 April 1780 to 31 December 1780, he served as county governor of Antvorskov and Korsør counties. On 1 January 1781, he was appointed as county governor of Sorø and Ringsted counties. He concurrently served as overhofmester of Sorø Academy. He held these posts until 5 March 1784.

== Property ==
In 1775, Raben bought the estates Næsbyholm and Bavelse from Johan Ludvig Holstein.

== Personal life ==
Raben was married to Dorothea Magdalene Buchwald (1757–1799) on 28 September 1776. She was a daughter of Caspar von Buchwald til Brusdorff and Sophie Charlotte von Hahn. Raben struggled with poor health from 1783. He died on 7 November 1784.

Næsbyholm and Bavelse passed to Frederik Sophus Raben. In 1704, he sold the estates to Christian Danneskiold-Samsøe.

== Awards ==
In 1775, Raben was created a White Knight. In 1780, he was awarded the title of geheimeråd.

Civic offices
Preceded by Frederik de Løvenørn	County Governor of Antvorskov County; 1780—1781	Succeeded by FEsajas Fleischer
Preceded by Frederik de Løvenørn	County Governor of Korsør County; 1780—1781	Succeeded by FEsajas Fleischer
Preceded by Veit Christof von Reitzenstein	County Governor of Ringste dCounty; 1781—1841	Succeeded by Gregers Christian Haxthausen
Preceded by Veit Christof von Reitzenstein	County Governor of Sorø County; 1781—1841	Succeeded by Gregers Christian Haxthausen
