= Vind =

Vind is a Danish surname meaning wind. Notable people with the surname include:

- Birgitte Vind (born 1965), Danish politician
- Christian Vind (1664–1712), Danish army officer and county governor
- Ditte Vind (born 1994), Danish handball player
- Frederik Vind (1662–1702), Danish landowner
- Iver Vind (1590–1658), Danish statesman, diplomat and landowner
- Jens Juel-Vind (1694–1726), Danish nobleman
- Jens Krag-Juel-Vind (1724–1776), Danish nobleman
- Marianne Vind (born 1970), Danish politician
- Nim Vind (fl. 2005), Canadian musician
- Sophia Magdalena Krag-Juel Vind (1734–1810), Danish noble
