= Jens Krag-Juel-Vind =

Danish nobleman, Supreme Court justice and landowner (1724–1776)

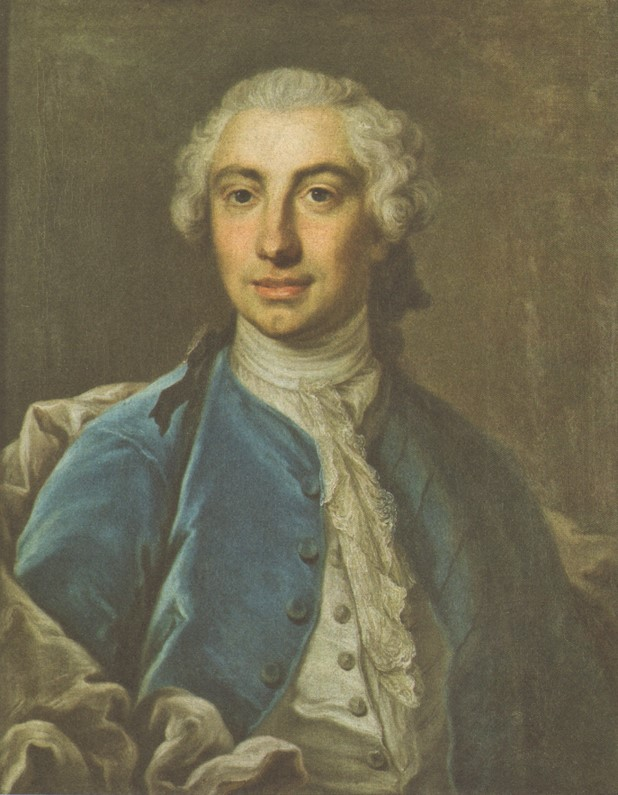
- Born: 15 June 1724; Halsted Priory, Denmark
- Died: 30 April 1776 (aged 51); Juellinge (now Halsted Priory), Denmark
- Resting place: Halsted Church
- Education: University of Hannover; University of Copenhagen
- Occupations: Supreme Court justice, landowner
- Spouse: Sophie Magdalene von Gram

Jens Krag-Juel-Vind (15 June 1724 – 30 April 1776), Baron of Juellinge, was a Danish nobleman, Supreme Court justice and landowner.

== Early life and education ==
He was born at Juellinge (now Halsted Priory), the son of Jens Juel-Vind (1694-1726) and Ide Helle Margaretha, Baroness Krag (1697-1738). He had two sisters. His father died when he was just two years old and Juellinge was then managed by his maternal uncle Niels Juel Reedtz (1699-1742) of Palsgaard and by Joachim Gersdorff. Krag-Juel-Vind studied at the University of Hannover from 1741 and at the University of Copenhagen from 1743.

== Career ==
He served as an accessor in the Danish Chancellery from 1745 to 1756. On 17 October 1746, he was appointed as squire (kammerjunker). From 11 February 1747, he held a seat at the Supreme Court without access to vote. From 2 January 1750, he served as Supreme Court justice. On 30, October 1757, he was appointed as chamberlain (kammerherre).

He was less active as Supreme Court justice from 1764 but voted for the last time on 23 December 1771. From 27 October 1756 to 15 December 1769, he served as county governor (amtmand) of Copenhagen. He was a member of the Royal Copenhagen Shooting Society from 1766. In 1764, he was awarded the Ordre de l'Union Parfaite. He was made a knight in the Order of the Danneborg in 1766.

In 1769–1774, he was a member of a commission regarding the extra taxes in Copenhagen. In 1769–1771, he served as justitiarius at the Supreme Court. In 1772, he was one of nine judges in the trial of royal physician Johann Friedrich Struensee (1737–1772). On 14 May that same year he was appointed as provisor for Vallø Castle. In 1773, he became a member of the executive board (Overskattedirektionen). On 13 July 1774, he became curator for Vemmetofte Adelige Kloster. On 21 October 1774, he was appointed as Privy Councilor (gehejmekonferensråd). On 30 August 1771, he was granted a patent on the surname Krag-Juel-Vind and the associated coat of arms. He served as chief legal officer for the Danish Asiatic Company from 1775. On 25 May 1780, he became a member of the Law Revision Commission.

== Property ==
Upon the death of his father in 1726, he succeeded as the holder of the Barony of Juellinge. In 1738, he also inherited the estate ( stamhuset) of Stensballegaard at Horsens following the death of his mother, Ida Helle Margarethe Krag.

== Personal life and legacy ==
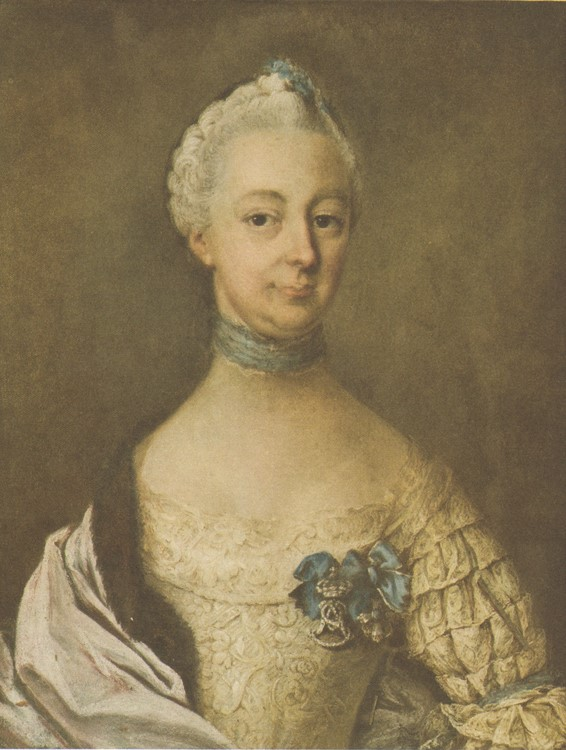
Sophie Magdalene von Gram

He married Sophie Magdalene von Gram (1734-1810) on 6 April 1752 in Christiansborg Chapel in Copenhagen. She was the daughter of Carl Christian von Gram (1703-1780) and Birgitte Christiane Frijss (1715–75). Her father was the Danish chief of magistrates.

They had six children of which only three survived to adulthood:

- Frederik Carl Krag-Juel-Vind-Frijs (9 January 1753 -10 April 1815)
- Sophie Magdalene Krag-Juel-Vind (4 July 1754 - 9 February 1833)
- Jens Carl Krag-Juel-Vind-Arenfeldt (12 October 1767 - 12 August 1855)

During the 1750s, Krag-Juel-Vind and his wife donated an altarpiece and a canopy for the baptismal font to Halsted Church. Both feature their coats of arms and are still present in the church. In 1751, they financed a refurbishment of the church.

Jens Krag-Juel-Vind died on 30 April 1776 at Juellinge. He was buried on 16 May in the Juel burial chapel at Halsted Church. His marble sarcophagus, by neoclassical sculptor Johannes Wiedewelt (1731–1802), was transferred to Uth Church in 1802.

Juellinge (Halsted Priory) was passed to his son Frederik Carl Krag-Juel-Vind-Frijs. The estate is still owned by his descendents.

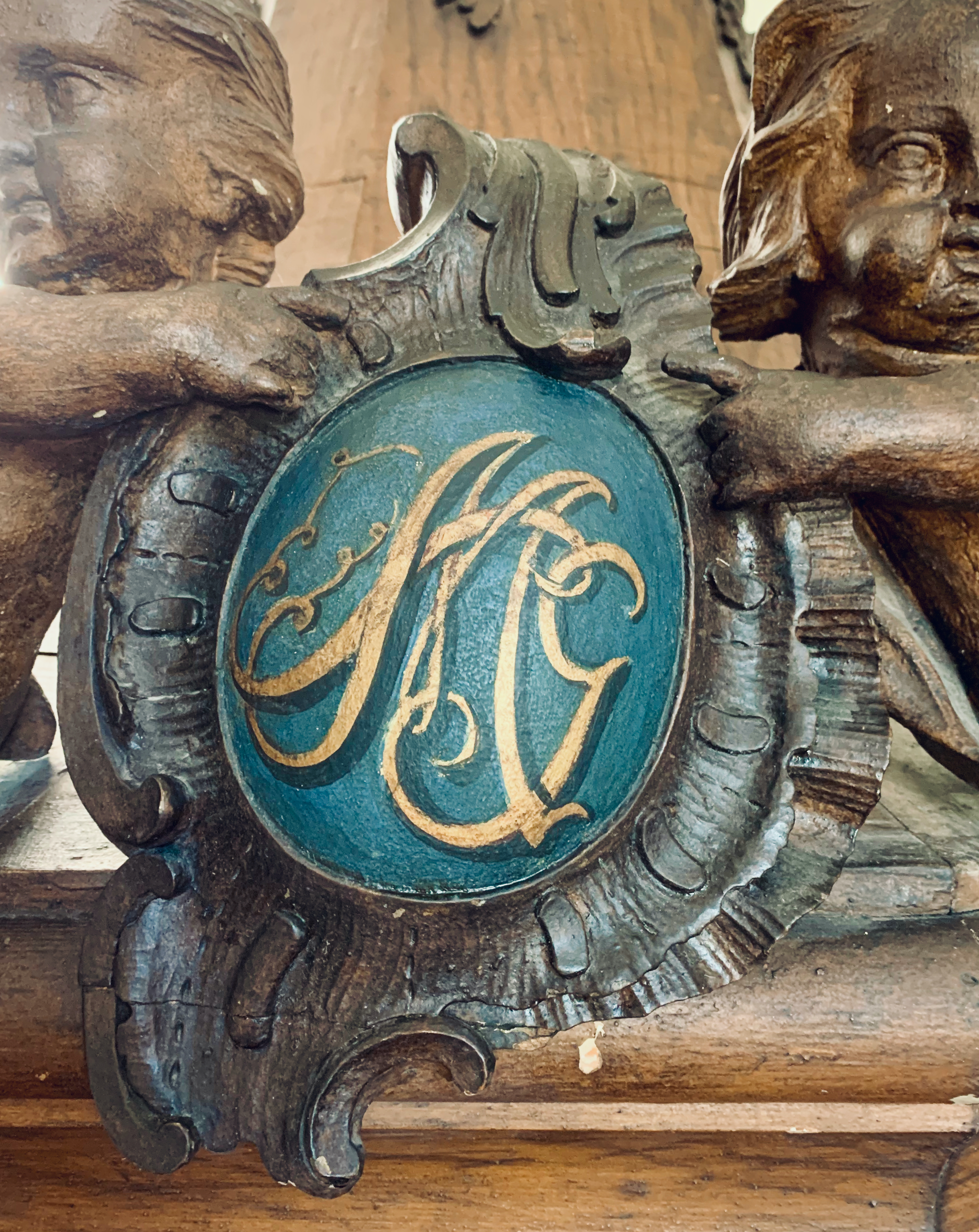
Sophie Magdalene Gram's monogram (S.B. G.) on the baptismal font in Halsted Church.

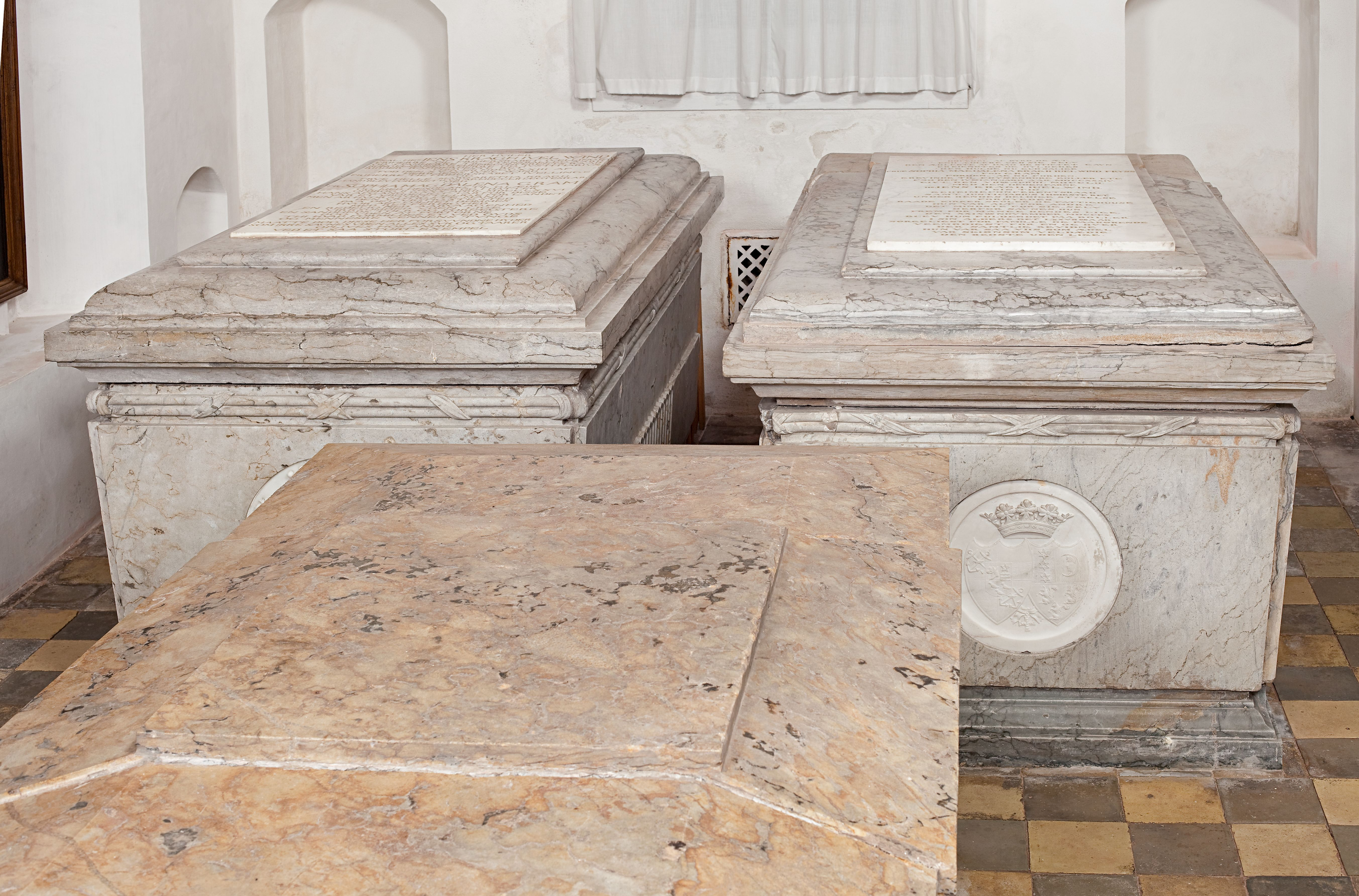
The sarcofagues of Jens Krag-Juel-Vind and his wife and daughter at Uth Church, Vejle.

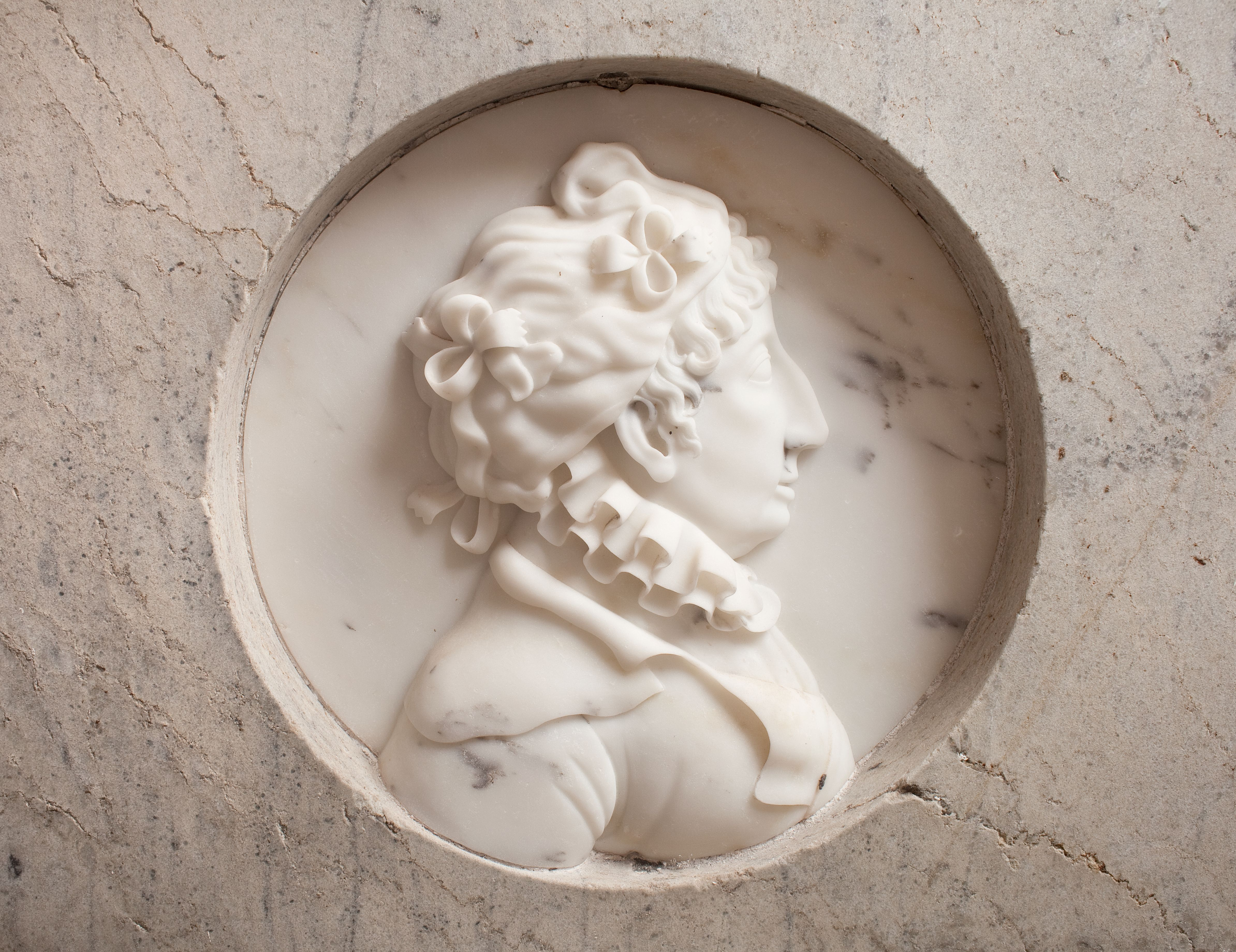
Portrait relief of Krag-Juel-Vind's wife from her sarcofagus.

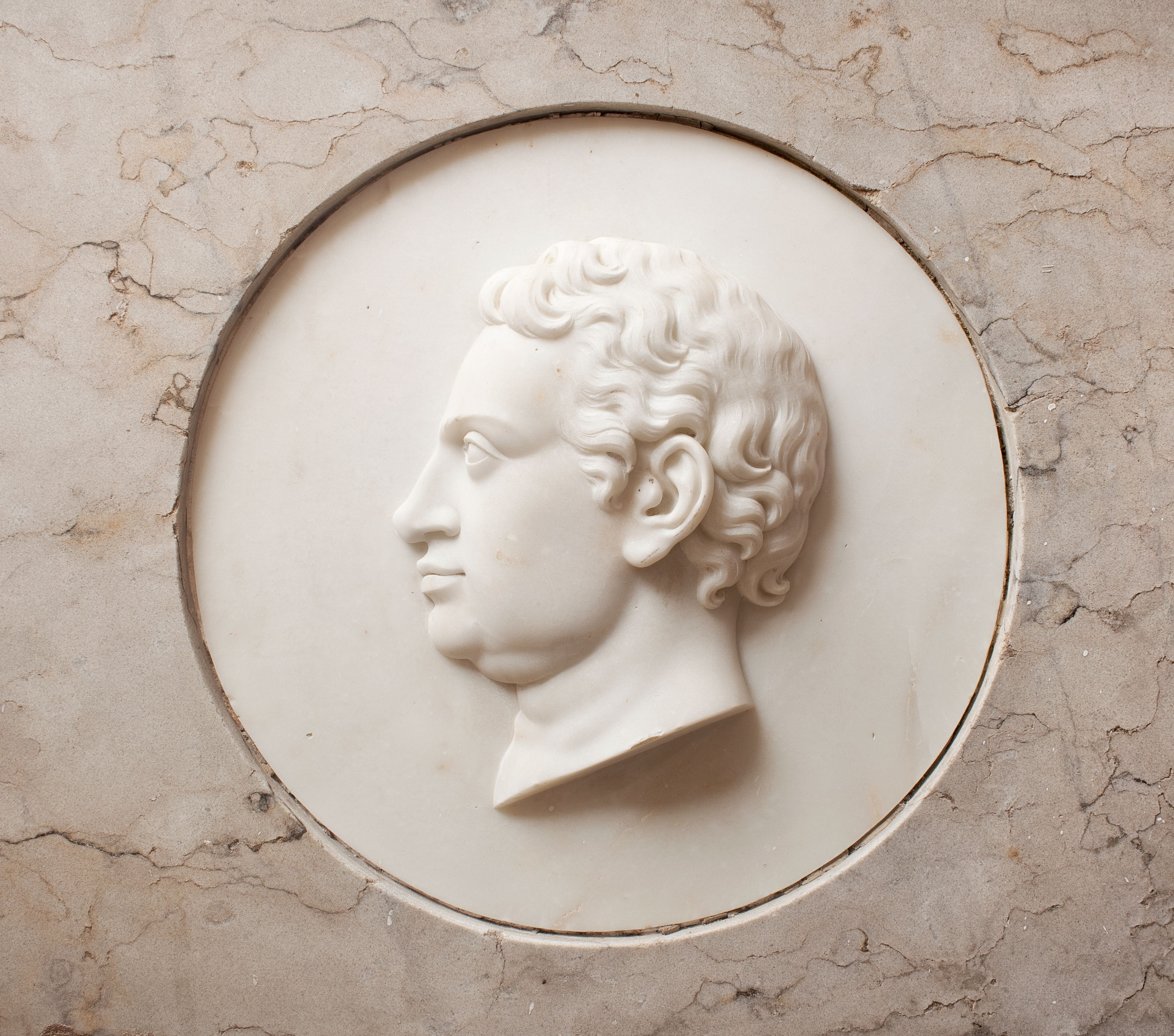
Portrait relief of Jens Krag-Juel-Vind on his sarcofagus.

== Ancestry ==
Ancestors of Jens Krag-Juel-Vind

16. Jørgen Vind
8. Holger Vind
17. Ingeborg Holgersdatter Ulfstand
4. Frederik Vind
18. Ove Giedde
9. Margrethe Ovesdatter Giedde
19. Dorthe Knudsdatter Urne
2. Jens, Baron Juel-Vind
20. Erik Juel
10. Jens lensbaron Juel
21. Sophie Clausdatter Sehested
5. Sophia Catharina Juel
22. Otte Skeel
11. Vibeke Ottesdatter Skeel
23. Ide Jørgensdatter Lunge
1. Jens, Baron Krag-Juel-Vind
24. Christen Eriksen Krag
12. Erik Krag af Jylland
25. Ellen Christensdatter Vind
6. Frederik baron Krag
26. Palle Rosenkrantz
13. Vibeke Pallesdatter Rosenkrantz
27. Ingeborg Nielsdatter Krabbe
3. Ide Helle Margaretha, Baroness Krag
28. Joachim Schumacher
14. Peder Schumacher, Count of Griffenfeld
29. Maria Motzfeldt
7. Charlotte Amalie Griffenfeld
30. Mikkel Nansen
15. Cathrine Nansen
31. Karen Rasmusdatter Hellekande
