= Jens Juel =

Jens Juel may refer to:

== People ==
- Jens Juel (diplomat) (1631–1700), Danish diplomat
- Jens Juel (painter) (1745–1802), Danish painter
- Jens Hermansson Juel (1580–1634), Danish nobleman
- Jens Juel-Vind (1694-1726), Baron of Juellinge, Danish chamberlain and landowner
- Jens Krag-Juel-Vind (1724-1776), Baron of Juellinge, Danish Supreme Court justice and landowner
- Jens Juel (1897–1978), owner of Petersgaard

== Other uses ==
- Jens Juel series, notes of Danish krone

== See also ==
- Juel (disambiguation)
- Jens (disambiguation)
