= Harrestedgård =

Manor house near Næstved, Denmark

General information
- Location: Næstved Municipality, Slagelsevej 283; 4700 Næstved, Denmark
- Coordinates: 55°16′38.83″N 11°36′21.22″E
- Completed: c. 1350/1840s

Harrestedgård, also known as Harrested Manor (Danish: Harrested Hovedgård), is a manor house and estate located 10 kilometres northwest of Næstved, Denmark. The main building, which partly dates from the Middle Ages and partly from the 1840s, was listed on the Danish registry of protected buildings and places in 1918.

== History ==
=== Rani and Markmand families ===
In the Middle Ages, Harrestedgaard was located in a village named Harrested. The first known owner of the estate is Karl Nielsen Rani.

After his death in 1344, Harrestedgård passed to his two children. his daughter, Ingerd Karlsdatter Rani, the widow of Peder Grubbe, brought her half of the estate into her second marriage with Iven Markmand. Iven Markmand became the sole owner of the estate when his brother-in-law died in 1366. Harrestedgård then remained in the hands of the Markmand family for the next 150 years.

=== Parsberg family ===
In around 1503, Jørgen Evertsen Markmand sold the estate to the brothers Jørgen and Tønne Parsberg. Jørgen Markmand and the Parsberg brothers were later involved in a controversy with Jørgen Rud, who claimed to be entitled to a share in the Harrestedgaard estate. In 1493, King John ruled in favour of Rud. A complaint filed by him ten years later seem to indicate that he was never actually compensated.

Tønne Parsberg passed Harrestedgård to his son, Verner Tønnesen Parsberg, a pricy counsellor, who played a significant role during the Northern Seven Years' War. Harrestedgaard was later passed down to his son Tønne Versersen Parsbnerg. After his death, it was passed to his younger brother Niels Vernersen Parsberg. The next owner of the estate were his son Frederik Nielsen Parsberg(1592–1634)-

=== Lykke and Vind ===
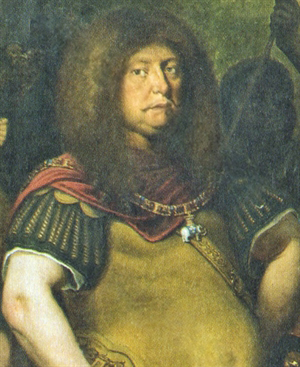
Holger Vind

In 1634, Frederik Parsberg sold the estate to Niels Lykke. He significantly increased the size of the estate. In 1638, Harrestedgaard was sold to admiral Jørgen Vind, who was killed in the Battle of Colberger Heide. Harrestedgård then passed to his three sons. In 1674, Holger Vind bought out his two brothers. In the same year, he also established another manor, Gjeddesdal, naming it after his wife, Margrethe Ovesdatter Wind (née Gjedde, 1637–1706), a daughter of Ove Gjedde. In 1676, he was granted royal permission to shot downdown the village of Harrested. All the land was subsequently placed directly under the manor. In 1679, Holger Vind was appointed as Vice-Chancellor of Danske Kancelli.

After Holger Vind's death, Harrestedgaard passed to his son Frederik Vind. He was married to Sophie Cathrine Juel, a daughter of Jens Juel. Their eldest son Jens Juel Vind succeeded his maternal grandfather the Barony of Juellinge. Neither of their two youngest sons survived childhood. After Frederik Vind's death, In 1702, Harrestedgaard was therefore passed to his brother Vilhelm Carl Vind,

=== Plessen family ===
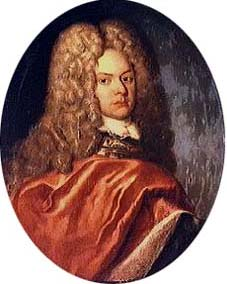
Carl Adolf von Plessen

Holger Vind's son, Vilhelm Carl Vind, sold Harrestedgård to Carl Adolf von Plessen. Plessen was already the owner of seven estates on the southern part of Zealand. Having no children, Plessen established De Plessenske Fideikommisgodser. Many of the later owners spent most of their time on their German estates.

=== Later owners ===
In 1925. Harrestedgård passed to Baron Johann Ludvig von Plessen. He served as German envoy in Rome. After the Second World War, an act was passed that made it possible to confiscate German property in Denmark. The government confiscated Harrestedgård and part of the land was subsequently sold off in lots.

In 1049, Ove Christian Riisberg purchased the rest of the estate.e Lars Foghsgaard, who had made a fortune on the sale of Scandinavian Mobility, bought Harrestedgård in 1998. In 2002, he sold the estate to Jannik Hartvig Jensen.

== Architecture ==
The oldest parts of the main building date from approximately 1350. The building is constructed in red brick on a foundation of field stone. The building is only 14 metre long. Many of the walls are 1.2 -1.3 m thick and have probably originally supported a two-storey building. This building was reduced to a single storey in the 1840s. 1.6 metres of the old walls were in the same time removed but the building was at the same time extended by more than nine metres to the south. Two east-facing, half-timbered side wings were formerly attached to the main wing. They were probably constructed during the Renaissance and demolished before 1816. An extension to the west side of the building was constructed in 1912. In 1923, a veranda was constructed towards the garden.

The building is now white-washed and has a red tile roof. The building was in 1953 refurbished under supervision of the architect s F. and L. Halleløv. Fredningsstatus 2013: Hovedbygningen er fredet. The building was listed on the Danish registry of protected buildings and places in 1918.

== Today ==
Harrestedgård was in 2012 acquired by Vincens Chr. C. Lerche after he had ceded Benzonsdal to his son.

== List of owners ==
- ( -1344) Karl Nielsen Rani
- (1344–1350) Ingerd Karlsdatter Rani, gift 1) Grubbe 2) Markmand
- (1350–1355) Asser Grubbe
- ( -1355) Jakob Karlsen Rani
- (1355–1386) Iven Markmand
- (1386- ) Henrik Ivensen Markmand
- ( -1423) Iven Henriksen Markmand
- (1420- ) Henrik Ivensen Markmand
- (1420–1446) Evert Ivensen Markmand
- ( -1462) Karl Ivensen Markmand
- (1462–1485) Evert Markmand
- (1485–1503) Jørgen Evertsen Markmand
- ( -1503) Jørgen Rud
- (1503–1507) Jørgen Parsberg
- (1503–1521) Tønne Parsberg
- (1521–1567) Verner Tønnesen Parsberg
- (1567–1575) Tønne Vernersen Parsberg
- (1575–1592) Niels Vernersen Parsberg
- (1592–1634) Frederik Nielsen Parsberg
- (1634–1638) Niels Lykke
- (1638–1644) Jørgen Vind
- (1644–1674) Hans Jørgensen Vind
- (1644–1674) Christian Jørgensen Vind
- (1644–1683) Holger Jørgensen Vind
- (1683–1702) Frederik Vind
- (1702–1723) Vilhelm Carl Vind
- (1723–1758) Carl Adolf von Plessen
- (1758–1771) Estate of Carl Adolf von Plessen
- (1771–1801) Christian Ludvig Scheel von Plessen
- (1801–1819) Mogens Scheel von Plessen
- (1819–1853) Mogens Joachim Scheel Plessen
- (1853–1892) Carl Theodor August Scheel-Plessen
- (1892–1924) Gustav Frederik Hugo von Plessen
- (1924–1925) Estate of Gustav Frederik Hugo von Plessen
- (1925–1946) Johann Ludvig von Plessen
- (1946–1948) The Danish state
- (1948–1980) Ove Christian Riisberg
- (1980–2002) Lars Foghsgaard
- (2002–2012) Jannik Hartvig Jensen
- (2012–present) Vincens Chr. C. Lerche
