= Sparekassen for Store Heddinge og omegn =

Sparekassen for Store Heddinge og omegn (lit. The Savings Bank for Store Heddinge and Surroundings) was founded in 1839 in Store Heddinge, Denmark. Its former headquarters at Algade 11, a building from 1925, was listed on the Danish registry of protected buildings and places in 2003.

== History ==
Store Heddinge Savings Bank was founded in 1839. A new bank building was constructed in 1898 to design by Aage Lauritzen. The bank moved again when a new building at Algade 11 was inaugurated in 1925.

== See also ==
- Sparekassen for Hjørring By og Omegn
