= Juel =

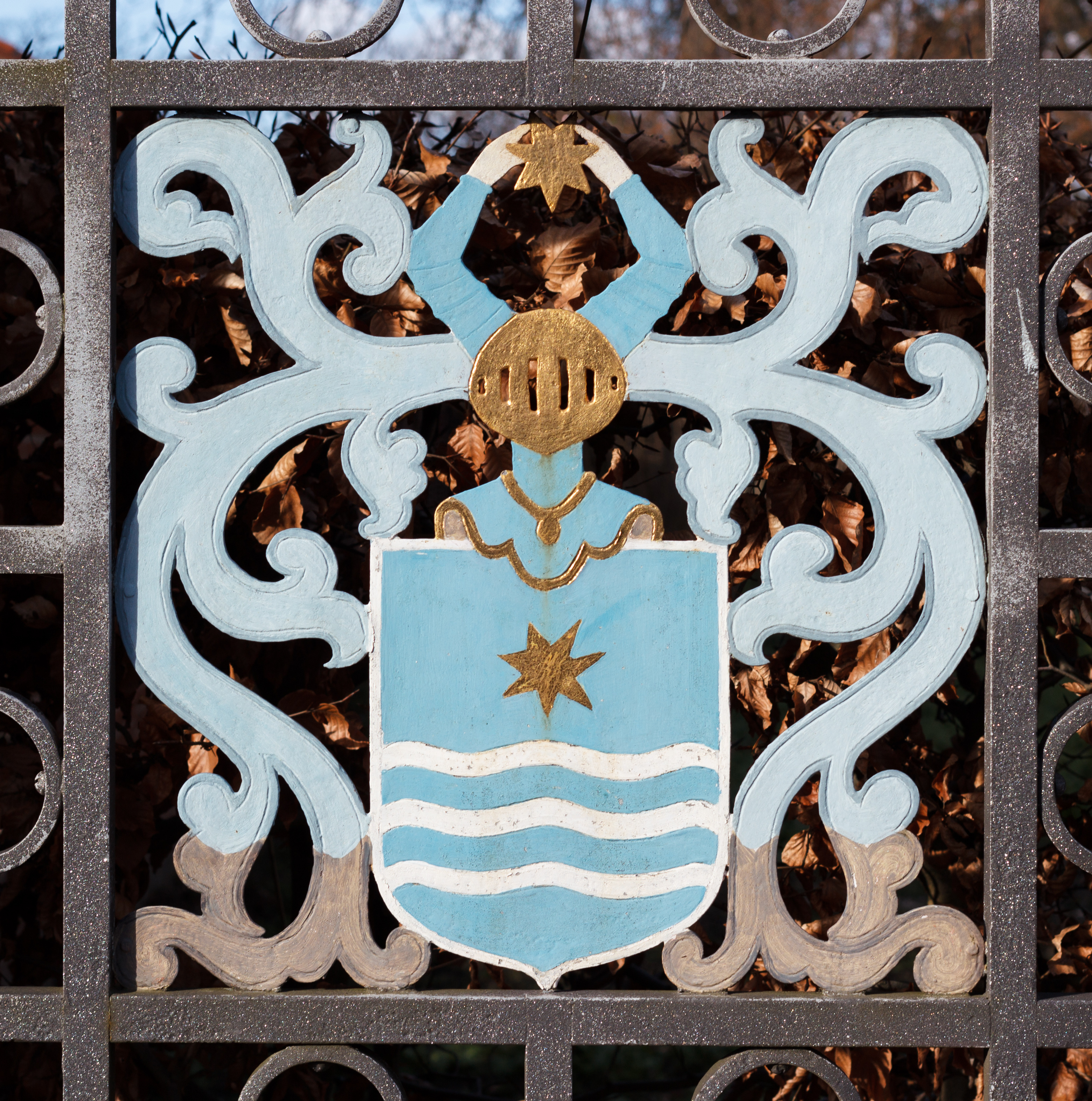
Coat of Arms of the Juel family

Juel is a Nordic surname and also a name of the family belonging Danish and Norwegian nobility.

Notable people with this surname include:

- Anne Juel, French-British physicist
- Christian Juel (1855-1935), Danish mathematician
- Dagfin Juel (1909-1985), Norwegian politician
- Dagny Juel (1867-1901), Norwegian writer
- Donald Juel (1942-2003), American educator
- Erik Juel (1591-1657), Danish courtier
- Jacob Juel (1744-1800), Norwegian timber trader
- Jens Juel (disambiguation), several people
- Karin Juel (1900-1976), Swedish artist
- Inger Juel (1926–1979) Swedish actress
- Maren Juel (1749-1815), Norwegian landowner
- Niels Juel (1629-1697), Danish admiral
- Povel Juel (1673-1723), Norwegian civil servant and writer
