= Halsted Church =

Coordinates: 54°50′49″N 11°13′32″E

- Halsted Kirke
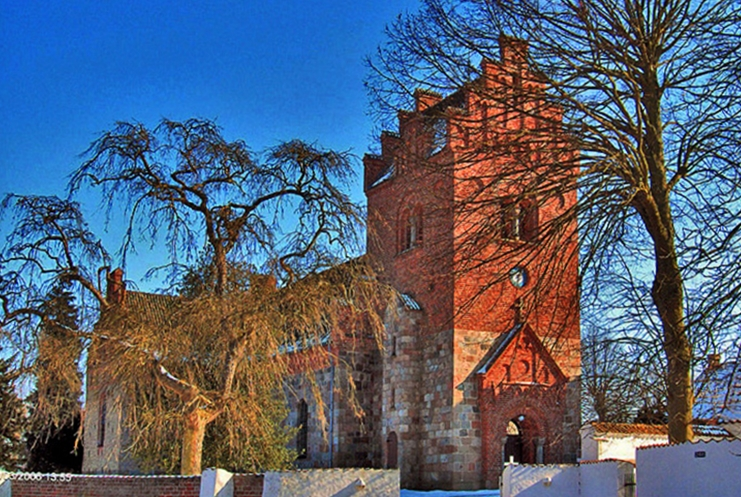
- Halsted Church
- Location: Nakskov, Lolland
- Country: Denmark
- Denomination: Church of Denmark

History
- Dedication: Saint Sampson the Hospitable

Architecture
- Architectural type: Romanesque architecture, Gothic architecture
- Completed: ca. 1100

Administration
- Diocese: Diocese of Lolland–Falster
- Deanery: Lolland Vestre Provsti
- Parish: Halsted Sogn

Halsted Church stands in the little village of Halsted some 6 km east of Nakskov on the Danish island of Lolland. Dating from the second half of the 12th century, the church has a Romanesque chancel and nave, a large burial chapel from 1636 and a tower from 1877. The church was closely associated with Halsted Priory, which has not survived.

== History ==
The granite church is first mentioned in 1177. It is therefore older than Halsted Kloster, the Benedictine priory with which it was associated from the 13th century until 1536. The church was dedicated to St. Samson the Breton. In 1177, the Crown's clerical appointment rights were transferred by King Valdemar to Ringsted Abbey, which continued to have responsibility over Halsted Priory.

At the time of the Reformation, ownership returned to the Crown, which retained it until 1719 when Halsted Priory was transferred to Jens Juel-Vind in exchange for Juellinge on Zealand. It was subsequently owned by members of the Juel-Vind family.

After the barony was dissolved in 1921, the church came under ownership of the adjoining main building, named Halsted Kloster. In 1987, Mogens-Krag-Juel-Vind-Frijs returned ownership to the church itself.

== Architecture ==
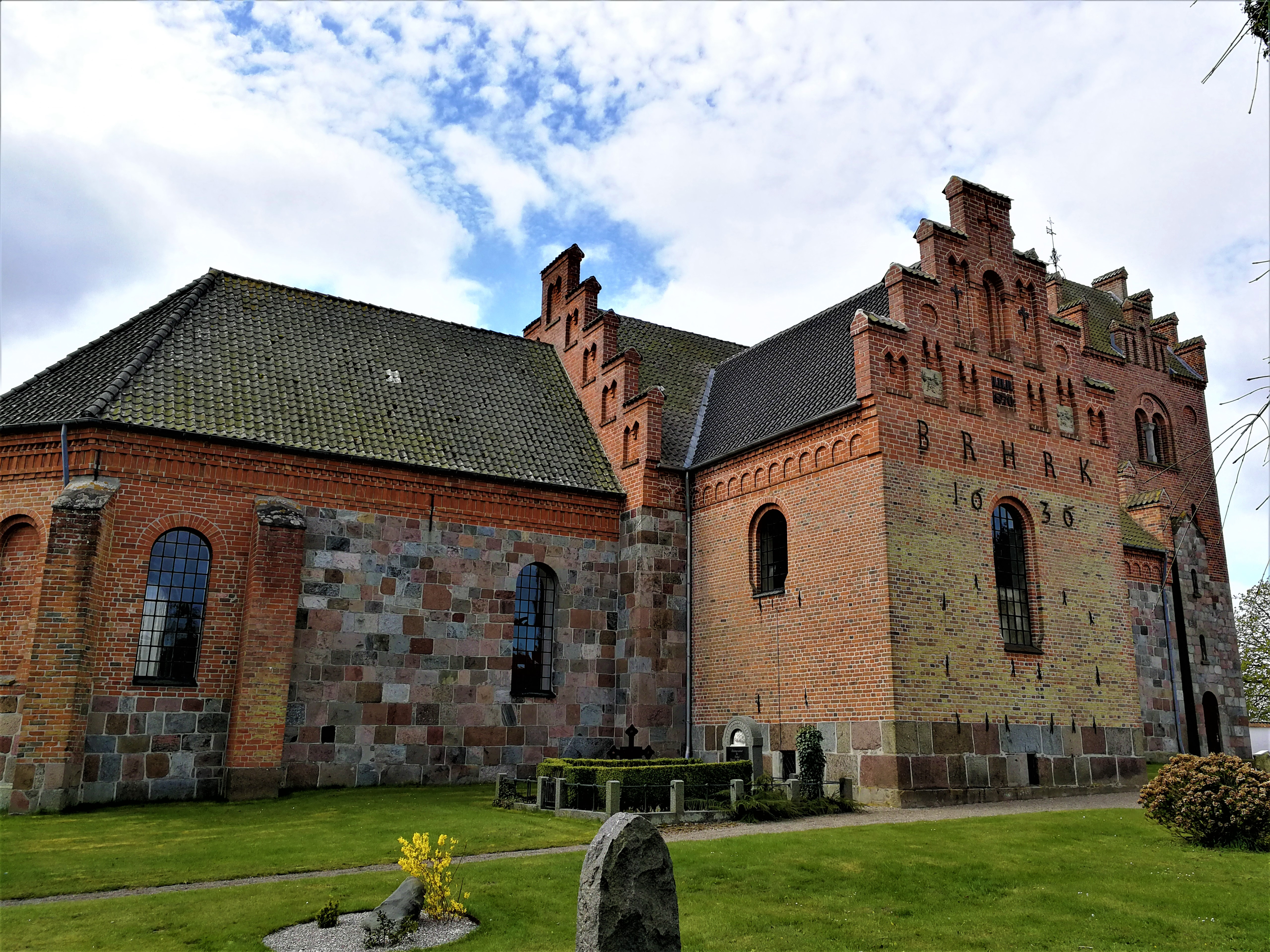
Halsted Church

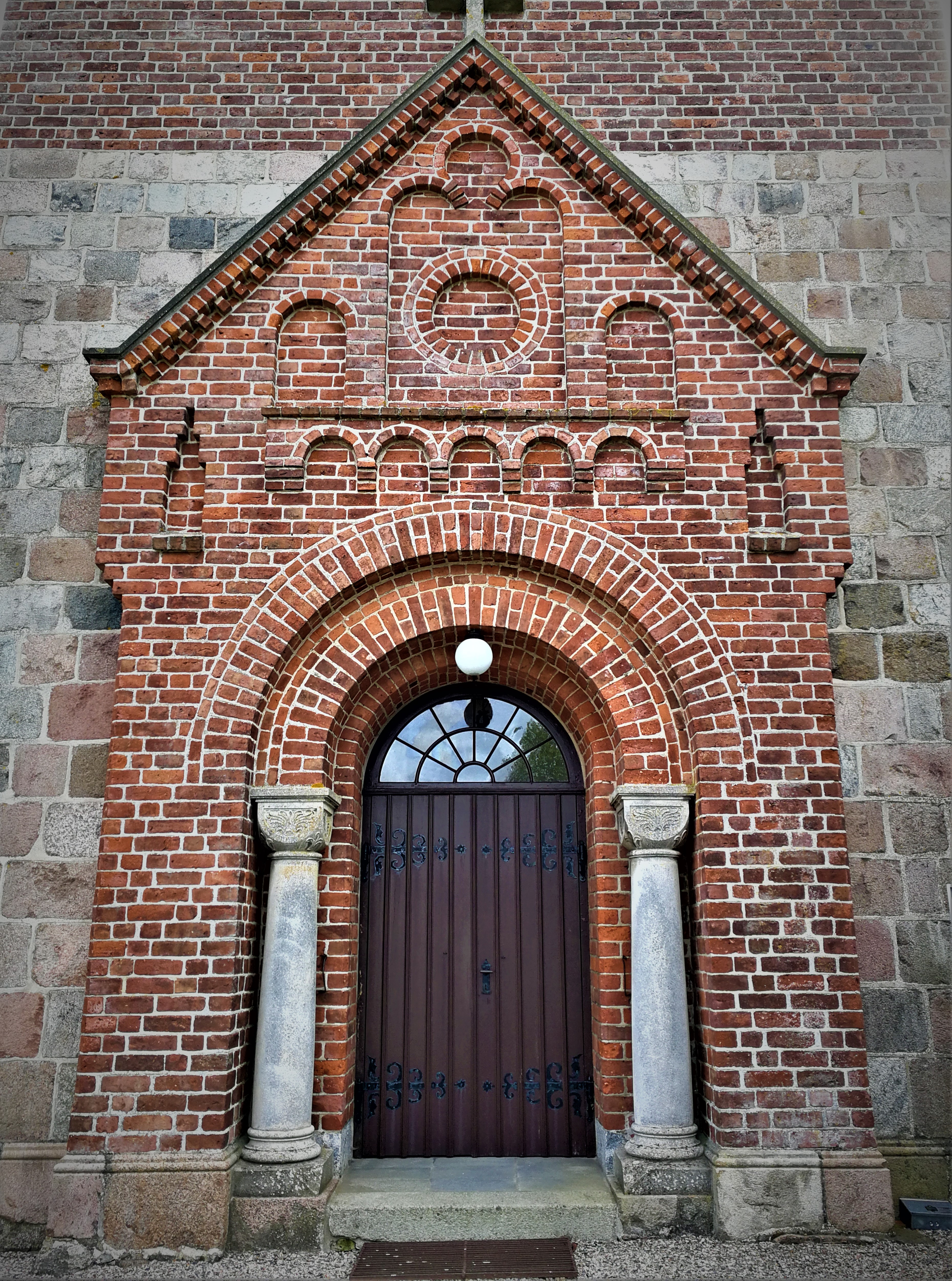
The main entrance

The church was originally a Romanesque building with a nave, chancel, apse and possibly a tower. Remains of the chancel and nave survive in the masonry of today's structure. When it became the priory church at the end of the 13th century, the chancel was extended to the east, its three-sided gable replacing the former apse. The church formed the northern wing of a four-winged priory of which nothing remains today. In 1510, the Lübeckers burnt down the abbey, probably also destroying the church's Romanesque tower. During the 16th century the church was extended towards the west. A low tower was built at the west end and was rebuilt in the 1870s. In 1636, Borkvard Rud obtained rights to build the north chapel as a burial chapel for the owners of nearly Sæbyholm. The church was fully restored from 1868 to 1877.

== Interior ==
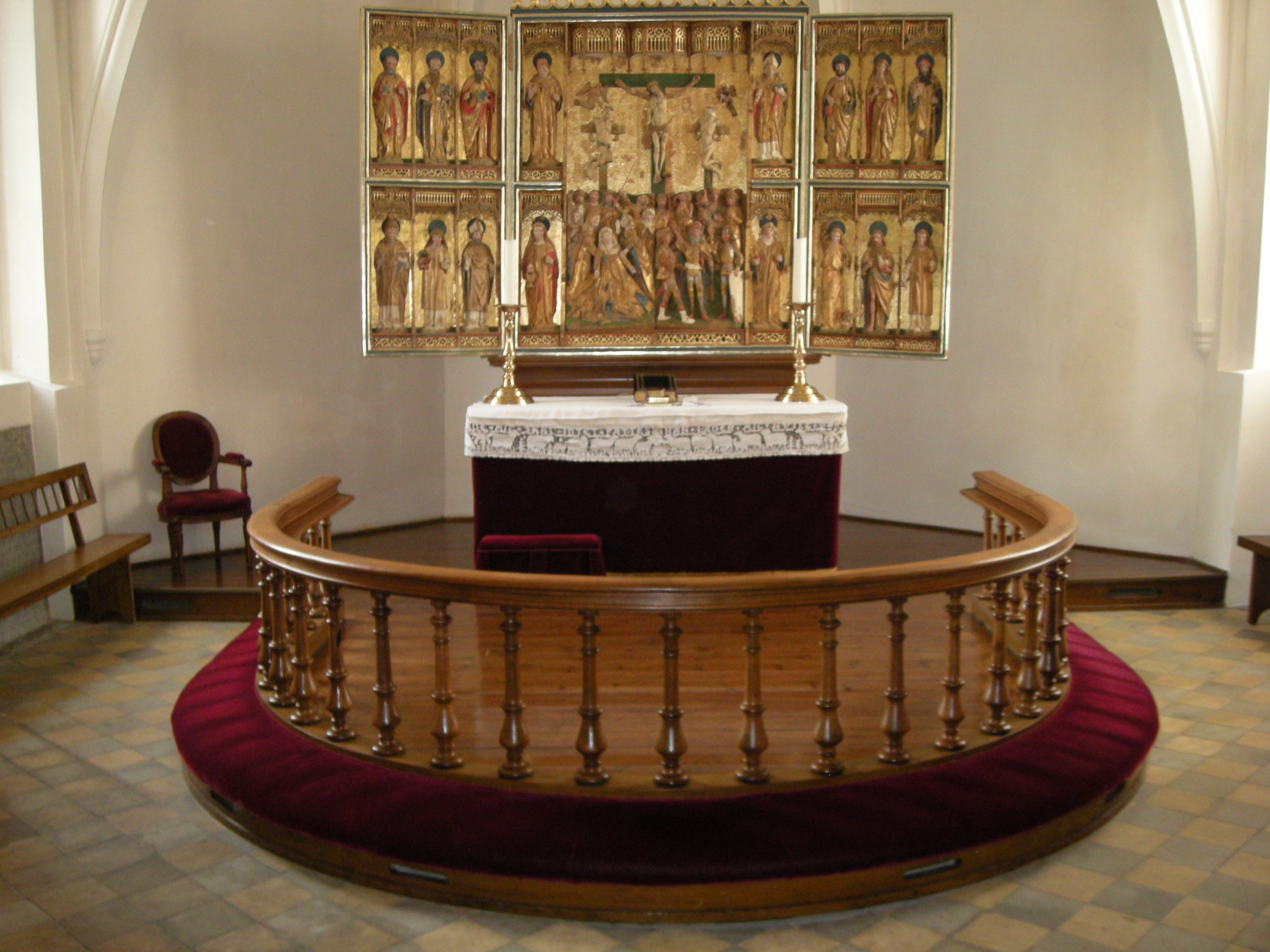
The 15th-century triptych altarpiece

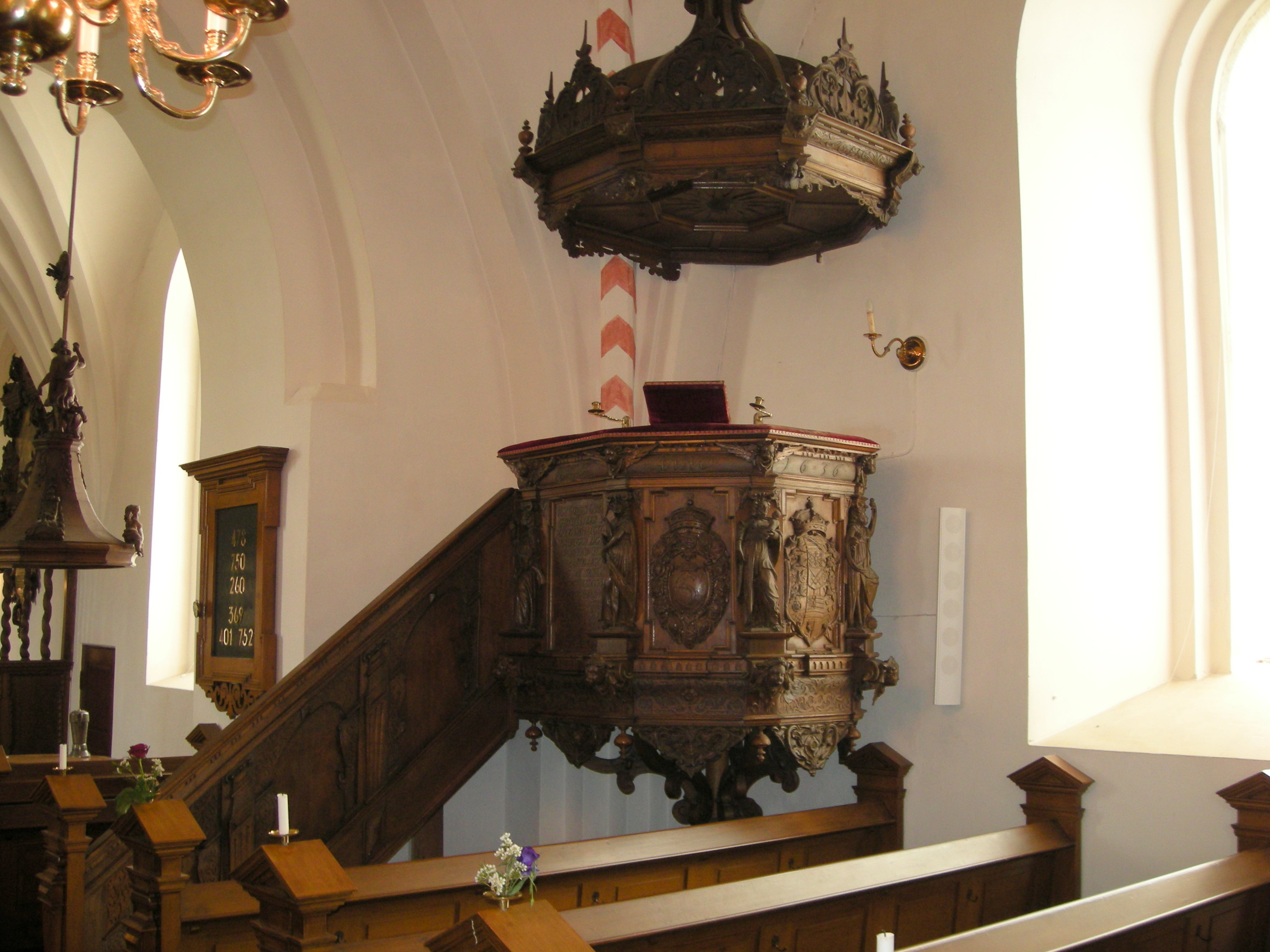
Jørgen Ringnis auricular pulpit (1636)

Vaults were introduced at the beginning of the 16th century, with three cross-vaults in the nave, two star-shaped vaults in the chancel and a five-sectioned vault at the end of the chancel. The late 15th-century altarpiece is a Gothic triptych with a scene of the crucifixion in the centre and saints and apostles on the two wings. The auricular chancel screen from 1671 with the 11 apostles and Christ's baptism was probably crafted by Henrik Werner. A Baroque altarpiece which crowned the altar from 1750 to 1877, when it was replaced by the 15th-century work, can now be seen on the north wall of the chancel. The auricular pulpit (1636), displaying representations of Faith, Hope and Charity as well as the arms of Prince Christian and Princess Magdalene Sibylle, is the work of Jørgen Ringnis. The font from c. 1750 is probably from the same workshop as the Baroque altarpiece.

== Graveyard ==
Johan Wegner (1811-1883), pastor and headmaster of Rødding Højskole, is interred in the graveyard.

== See also ==
- List of churches on Lolland
