= Old Town Hall (Store Heddinge) =

Building in Store Heddinge

Coordinates: 55°18′35″N 12°23′21″E

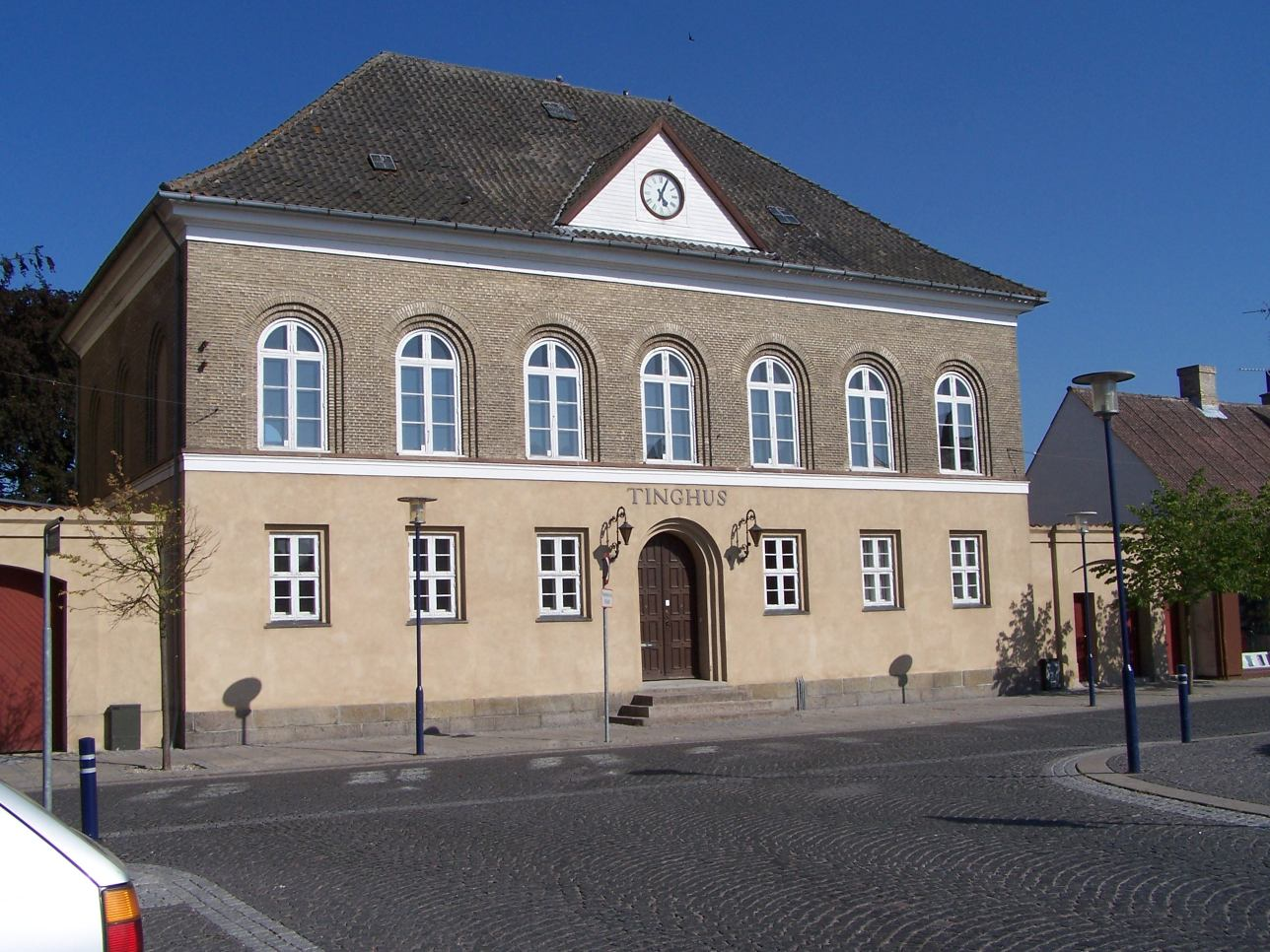
Picture of Old Town Hall

The Old Town Hall is a former combined town hall, courthouse and jailhouse situated on Nytorv in Store Heddinge, Denmark. It was listed on the Danish registry of protected buildings and places in 1977.

== History ==
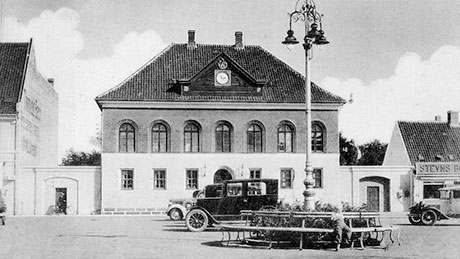
The old town hall

Store Heddinge's new town hall was constructed on the town's new main square Nytorv in 1836–38. The building was designed by royal master builder Jørgen Hansen Koch.

In 1948, it was sold to the Ministry of Justice and converted into a courthouse. In 2011, it was sold to Realdania. A comprehensive restoration of the building was completed in 2013.

== Architecture ==
The building is one of the earliest examples of the transition from Neoclassicism to Historicism in Danish architecture. The building was listed on the Danish registry of protected buildings and places in 1977.
