= Listed buildings in Stevns Municipality =

This is a list of listed buildings in Stevns Municipality, Denmark.

== List ==
=== 4600 Køge ===
| Listing name | Image | Location | Coordinates | Description |
|---|---|---|---|---|
| Slotsgade 3: Stiftskontoret | | Slotsgade 3, 4600 Køge | 55°24′3.01″N 12°12′38.42″E | |
| Slotsgade 3: Stiftskontoret | | Slotsgade 3, 4600 Køge | 55°24′3.01″N 12°12′38.42″E | |
| Slotsgade 4: Vallø Castle (Vallø Adelige Stift) | | Slotsgade 4, 4600 Køge | 55°24′8.09″N 12°12′39.69″E | |
| Slotsgade 9: Lægeboligen | | Slotsgade 9, 4600 Køge | 55°23′59.56″N 12°12′36.67″E | |
| Slotsgade 9: Lægeboligen | | Slotsgade 9, 4600 Køge | 55°23′59.56″N 12°12′36.67″E | |
| Betjentboligen | | Slotsgade 10, 4600 Køge | 55°24′3.73″N 12°12′37.06″E | Half timbered house from c. 1725 |
| Betjentboligen | | Slotsgade 10, 4600 Køge | 55°24′3.73″N 12°12′37.06″E | Later extension |
| Slotsgade 12: Old Rectory, Vallø | | Slotsgade 12, 4600 Køge | 55°24′2.93″N 12°12′37.54″E | Rectory from c. 1738 |
| Vallø Old Rectory | | Branddamsvej 1, 4600 Køge | 55°23′55.21″N 12°14′8.74″E | |
| Vallø Old Rectory | | Branddamsvej 1, 4600 Køge | 55°23′55.21″N 12°14′8.74″E | |
| Vallø Old Rectory | | Branddamsvej 1, 4600 Køge | 55°23′55.21″N 12°14′8.74″E | |
| Vallø Old Rectory | | Branddamsvej 1, 4600 Køge | 55°23′55.21″N 12°14′8.74″E | |

=== 4653 Karise ===
| Listing name | Image | Location | Coordinates | Description |
|---|---|---|---|---|
| Juellinge | | Juellingevej 2, 4653 Karise | 55°18′7.12″N 12°14′5.31″E | Nain building |
| Juellinge | | Juellingevej 2, 4653 Karise | 55°18′7.12″N 12°14′5.31″E | |
| Juellinge | | Juellingevej 2, 4653 Karise | 55°18′7.12″N 12°14′5.31″E | |

=== 4660 Store Heddinge ===
| Listing name | Image | Location | Coordinates | Description | source |
|---|---|---|---|---|---|
| Store Heddinge Savings Bank | | Algade 11, 4660 Store Heddinge | 55°18′37.18″N 12°23′21.06″E | Bank building from 1925 designed by G.B. Hagen | Ref |
| Gjorslev | | Gjorslevvej 20, 4660 Store Heddinge | 55°21′14.41″N 12°22′50.63″E | | Ref |
| Gjorslev | | Gjorslevvej 20, 4660 Store Heddinge | 55°21′14.41″N 12°22′50.63″E | | Ref |
| Gjorslev | | Gjorslevvej 20, 4660 Store Heddinge | 55°21′14.41″N 12°22′50.63″E | | Ref |
| Stevns Lighthouse | | Fyrvej 2, 4660 Store Heddinge | 1878 | New lighthouse | Ref |
| Stevns Lighthouse | | Fyrvej 2, 4660 Store Heddinge | 1818 | Old lighthouse | Ref |
| Ting- og Arresthus | | Algade 8, 4660 Store Heddinge | 55°18′34.65″N 12°23′21.02″E | | Ref |

=== 4672 Klippinge ===
| Listing name | Image | Location | Coordinates | Description |
|---|---|---|---|---|
| Andreassens Hospital | | Borgergade 11, 4672 Klippinge | 55°22′1.02″N 12°20′21.66″E | Hospital building from 1742 |
| Druebjerggård | | Tåstrupvej 31, 4672 Klippinge | 55°20′9.14″N 12°17′5.95″E | |
| Magleby Kirkelade, Lindencrones Stiftelse | | Kirkevænget 2, 4672 Klippinge | 55°21′47.56″N 12°20′16.05″E | |
| Trine's House | | Tåstrupvej 33, 4672 Klippinge | 55°20′8.87″N 12°17′8.19″E | |

=== 4673 Rødvig Stevns ===
| Listing name | Image | Location | Coordinates | Description |
|---|---|---|---|---|
| Lille Heddinge Rytterskole | | Ryttervej 2, 4673 Rødvig Stevns | 55°16′24.61″N 12°23′21.83″E | Rytterskole from 1722 |
| Østervang | | Broveshøjvej 19, 4673 Rødvig Stevns | 55°16′24.27″N 12°23′39.06″E | |
