= Jens Juel-Vind =

Danish chamberlain and landowner (1694–1726)

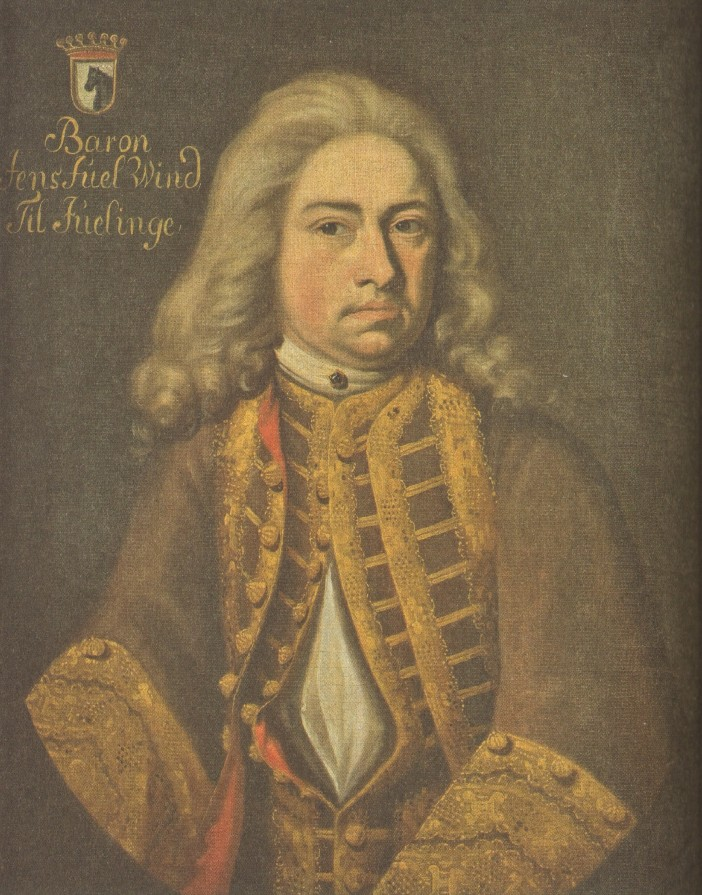
- Born: 1694; Huellinge, Denmark
- Died: 20 December 1726 (aged 31–32)
- Resting place: Hellested Church
- Occupation: Landowner

Jens Juel-Vind (1694 – 20 December 1726), baron of Juellinge, was a Danish chamberlain and landowner.

== Early life ==
Juel-Vind was born in 1694, the son of Frederik Vind of Harrested and Baggesvogn, and Sophia Catharina, Baroness Juel of Juellinge. His mother was a daughter of the statesman Jens Juel. He had no sons to succeed him as Baron of Juellinge and the estate was therefore passed on to his son-in-law in 1700.

== Career and property ==
He owned Juellinge from 1706. On 1 May 1708, he was awarded title of frierre under the name Juel-Vind. He was a student at the University of Copenhagen from 1712 to 1717. He served as a squire (kammerjunker) at Frederick IV's court. In 1719, he ceded the Barony of Juellinge to the king in exchange for Halsted Priory on Lolland. On 26 December 1721, Halsted Priory was elevated to a barony under the name Juellinge. He then served as squire for Princess Sophia Hedwig. On 1 April 1725, he was appointed to chamberlain (kammerherre).

== Family ==
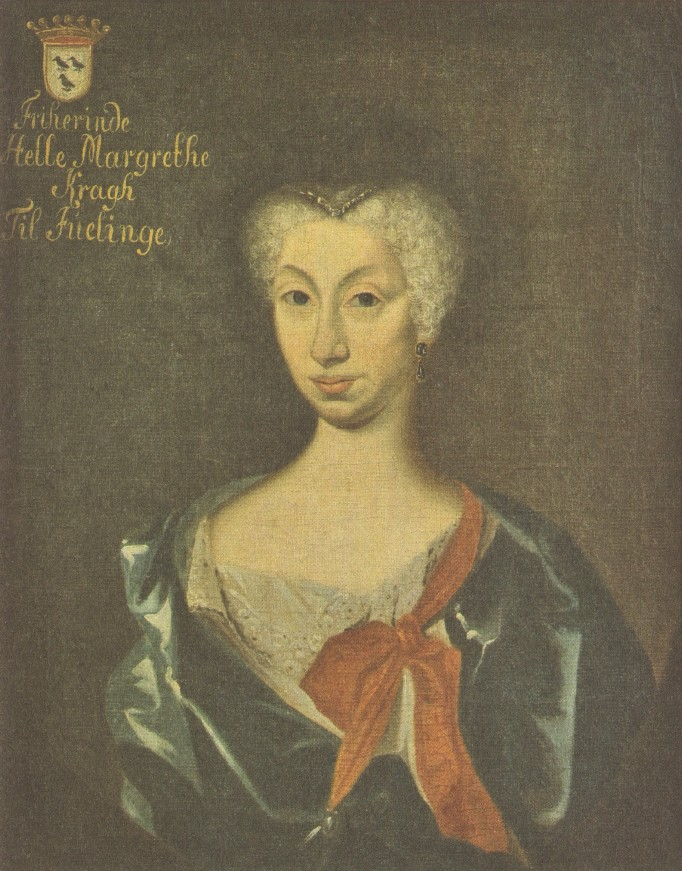
Ide Helle Margaretha, baroness Krag

On 27 June 1721, Juel-Vind married baroness Ide Helle Margaretha baronesse Krag (23 May 1697 - 28 August 1738). They had three children:

- Friderica Charlotte, Baroness Juel-Vind (30 July 1723 - 9 April 1761)
- Jens Krag-Juel-Vind, Baron of Juellinge (15 June 1724 - 30 April 1776)
- Edel Sophie, Baroness Juel-Vind (28 October 1725 - 26 January 1796)

== Ancestry ==
Ancestors of Jens Juel-Vind

16. Jacob Iversen Vind
8. Jørgen Vind
17. Else Jørgensdatter Høeg Banner
4. Holger Vind
18. Holger Ulfstand
9. Ingeborg Holgersdatter Ulfstand
19. Anna Hansdatter Skovgaard
2. Frederik, Varon Vind
20. Brostrup Knudsen Giedde
10. Ove Gjedde
21. Dorthe Pallesdatter Ulfeldt
5. Margrethe Ovesdatter Gieddel
22. Knud Axelsen Urne
11. Dorthe Knudsdatter Urne
23. Margrethe Eilersdatter Grubbe
1. Jens Juel-Vind
24. Peder Jensen Juel
12. Erik Juel
25. Margrethe Gregersdatter Ulfstand
6. Jens, baron Juel
26. Claus Maltesen Sehested
13. Sophie Clausdatter Sehested
27. Anne Nielsdatter Lykke
3. Sophia Catharina Juel
28. Albret Christensen Skeel
14. Otte Skeel
29. Berte Nielsdatter Friis
7. Vibeke Ottesdatter Skeel
30. Jørgen Lunge
15. Ide Jørgensdatter Lunge
31. Sophie Steensdatter Lunge
