= Halsted Priory =

Manor house in Lolland Municipality, Denmark

- Halsted Kloster
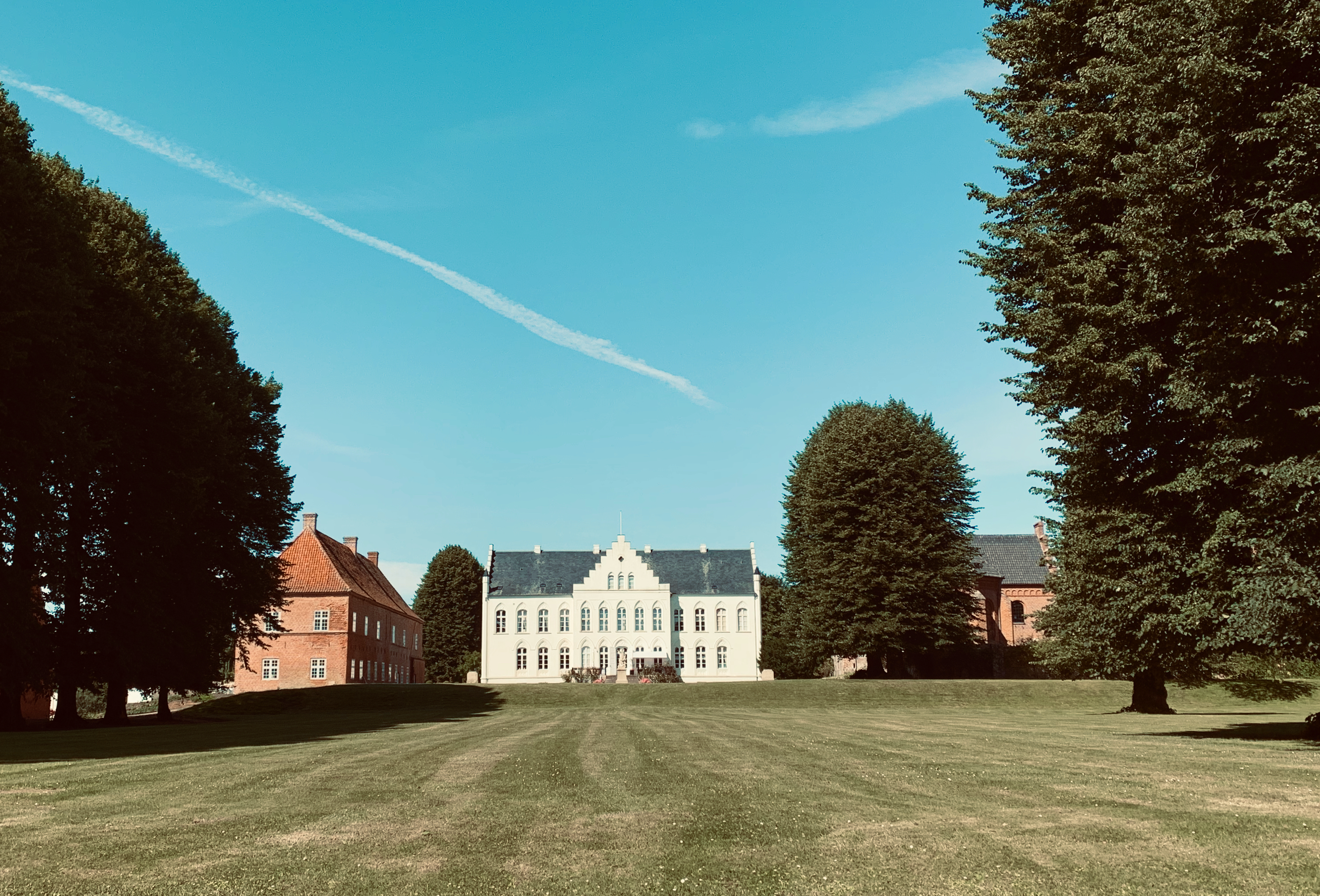
- Halsted Priory in 2020

General information
- Architectural style: Gothic Revival
- Location: Nykøbingvej 8, 4300 Holbæk, Denmark
- Coordinates: 54°50′48.26″N 11°13′31.18″E
- Completed: 1849

Halsted Priory (Danish: Halsted Kloster), formerly a small Benedictine house, is a manor house and estate located close to Nakskov on the island of Lolland in southeastern Denmark. The estate was renamed Juellinge when the Barony of Juellinge was restored for Jens Juel-Vind in 1721, but its old name was restored when the barony was dissolved in 1921. Holsted Priory is still owned by the Krag-Juel-Vind-Frijs family.

The Neo-Gothic main building is from 1847–1849. It is flanked by Halsted Church to the north and the old main building from 1591 to the south. The old main building has been renovated with support from Realdania and is now operated as a local cultural centre. The Baroque-style park covers approximately 6.5 hectares of land. The estate is also home to a golf club.

== History ==
=== The Benedictine priory ===
Halsted Priory is a crown property dating from the Viking era. A granite parish church was built on the site in the 12th century. A papal recognition of the priory was written in 1177. Halsted is next mentioned by name in Valdemar Sejr's 1231 Danish Census Book. Erik Plovpenny's daughter Jutta came into possession of Halsted in 1284 but unexpectedly died the same year. She willed it to the abbot of the Benedictine priory in Ringsted. The existing church at Halsted was constructed around the earlier church in conjunction with the building of the daughter monastery which was dedicated to St. Samson the Breton. The church became a pilgrimage site for commoners and royals alike for the veneration of St. Samson, because the church had a reliquary with his head in it.

The priory was built in a roughly rectangular shape with space for a dormitory, refectory, kitchens, storage, cellars, and space for lay brothers. No contemporary description of Halsted Priory survives. Given the time period in which it was built, it can safely be said that the buildings were built in Gothic style out of brick as evidenced by the church which still stands today. The interior spaces had vaulted roofs. Halsted was a small house, but must have had at least a few income properties; these would normally have been gifted or willed to a monastery in return for prayers for the souls of the recently departed.

The only historical event known to involve the priory was when Prince Erik, the son of Christoffer II, lay at Halsted for 14 days before being moved to his final resting place at Sorø Abbey.

In 1510, the Hanseatic League sacked nearby Nakskov and then sailed up the fjord to Halsted, where they set fire to the priory and both the east and west ranges. The priory was restored and was made an abbey, but the winds of change were blowing in Denmark and would within a decade empty the priory permanently. The last abbot of Halsted, Jens Fugl, was installed in circa 1520. The priory archives were entirely lost; the only remaining document today is a single letter of indulgence dated 1517.

By the 1520s many Danes were extremely unhappy with the financial burdens the Catholic church imposed on them. In addition to forced payment of tithes and fees for every conceivable service, peasant tenants were also required to work fields and farms owned by the many religious institutions that were a part of everyday life in Denmark at the time. Christian II, Denmark's last Catholic king, was exiled, leaving Frederick I on the throne. Frederik attempted to find a middle ground between the newly fervent Lutherans and the fiercely traditional Catholics. Funds used to support small religious houses like Halsted simply evaporated. Being a daughter house made the priory vulnerable to funding cuts, and it was impossible for the small, out-of-the-way priory to continue operating. Denmark became Lutheran in October 1536 under Christian III. Halsted was permitted to keep its monks until 1537, when the priory reverted to the crown.

=== Crown property ===
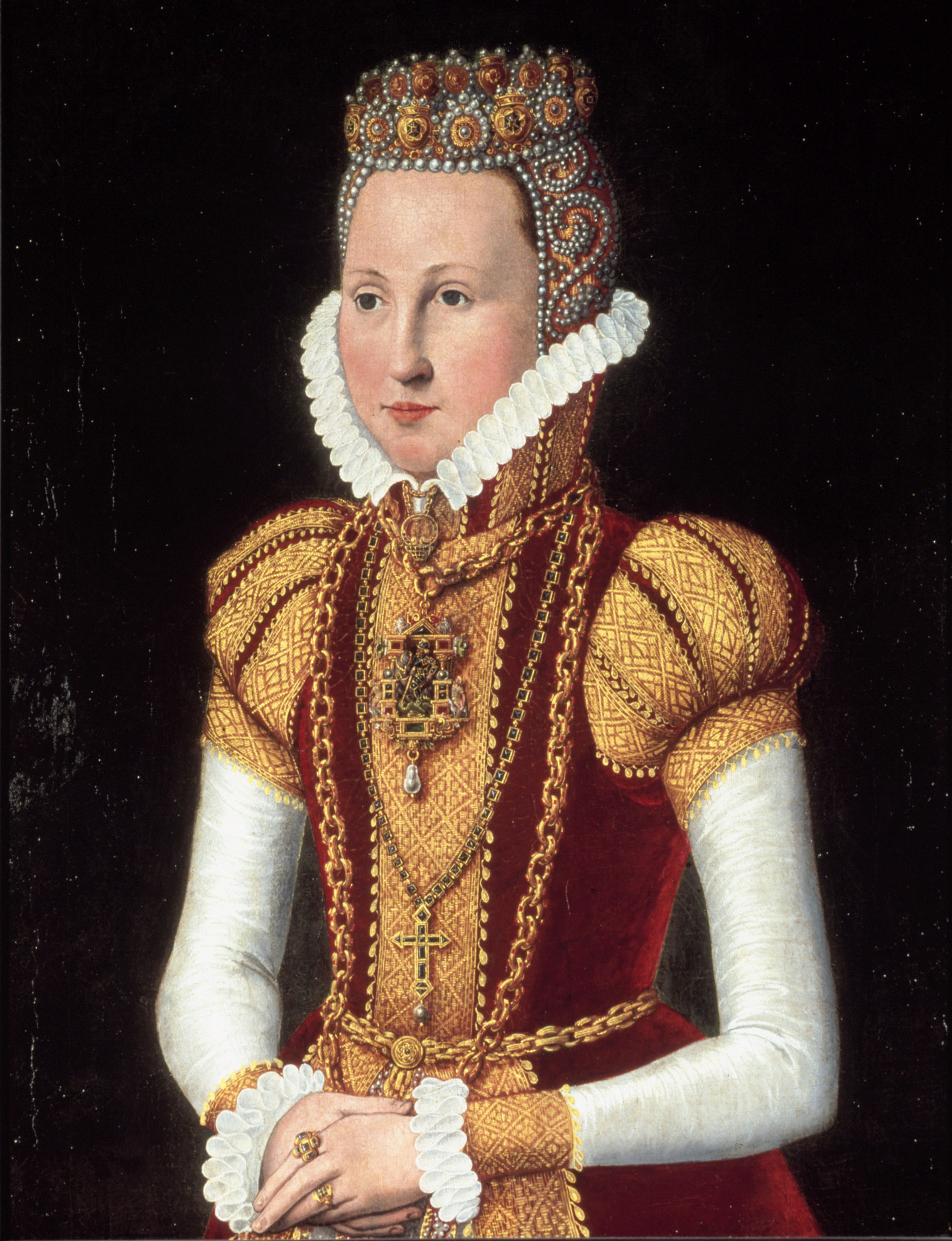
Sophie of Mecklenburg-Güstrow for whom the old main building was constructed

After it returned to the crown, the abbey became a royal fief. The first lensmand was Otte Rathlou, who had supported Christian III economically during the Count's Feud. Later vassals included Peder Oxe, Jørgen Grubbe and Erik Rosenkrantz.

From 1588 to 1631, Halsted Kloster served as the life estate for dowager queen Sophie. She resided at nearby Nykøbing Castle, but she expanded the priory complex in 1591 with a new main building, including a grand staircase and prison tower. From 1647 to 1652, Halsted Kloster served as life estate for Princess Magdalene Sybille. From 1670 to 1685, Halsted Kloster and the crown land on Falster served as life estate for dowager queen Sophie Amalie.

=== The Juel family ===
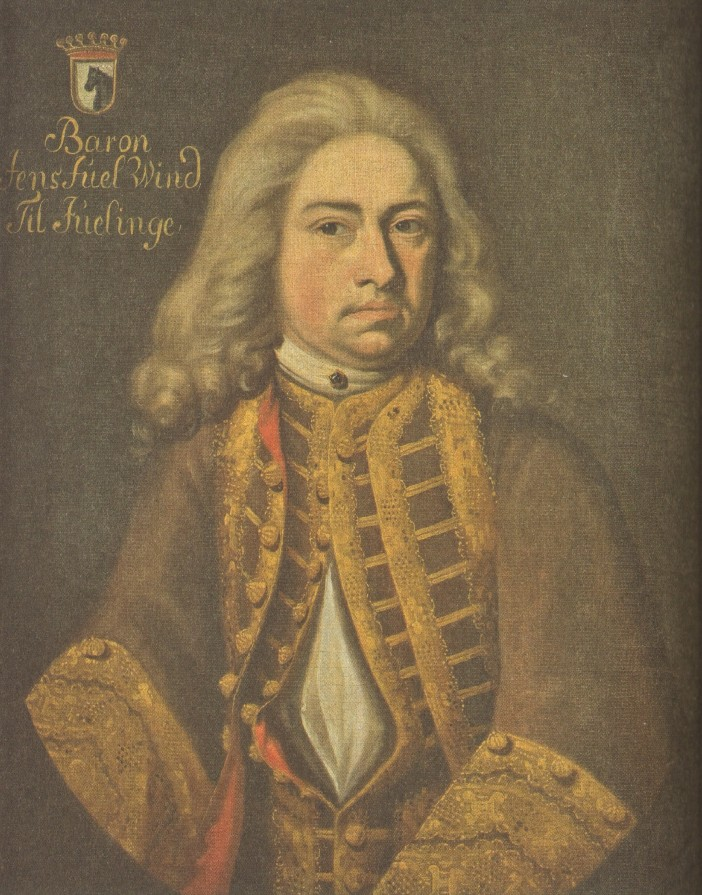
Jens Juel-Vind

In 1719, Frederik IV ceded Halsted Kloster to Jens Juel-Vind in exchange for Juellinge on Zealand. The older buildings were in sad disrepair, as noted in a crown inventory. In 1721, the estate was renamed Juellinge and becamer the administrative centre of the Barony of Juellinge.

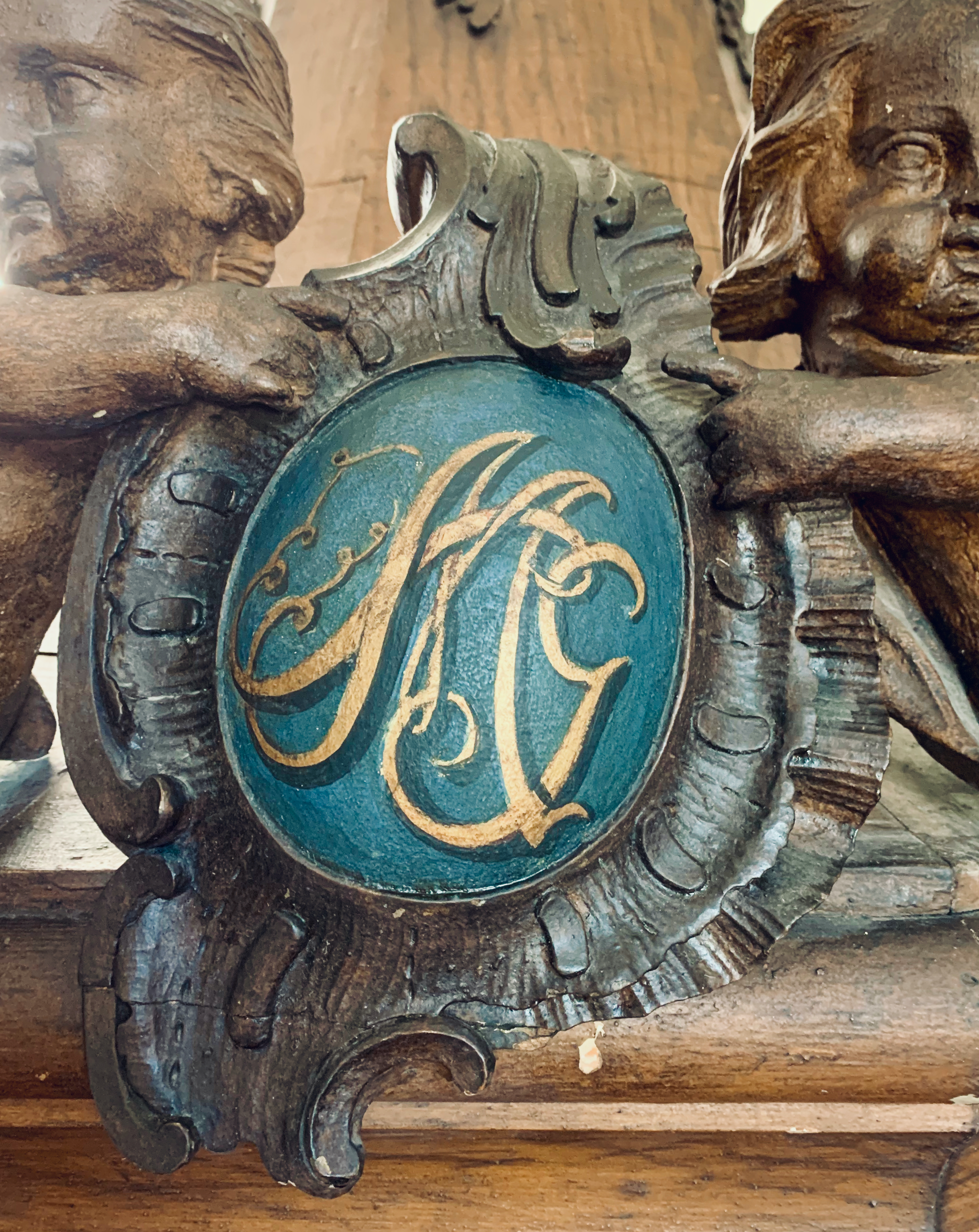
Sophie Magdalene Gram's monogram on the font in Halsted Church.

After Jens Juel-Vind's death in 1726, Juellinge was passed to his son Jens Krag-Juel-Vind. In 1738, he also inherited stamhuset Stensballegaard from his mother Ida Helle Margrethe Krag's side. After Jens Krag-Juel-Vind's death in 1776, Juellinge and Stensballegaard were passed on to his son Frederik Carl Krag-Juel-Vind. He added -Friis to his name when he inherited Frijsenborg following his mother Sophie Magdalene von Grams's death in 1810.

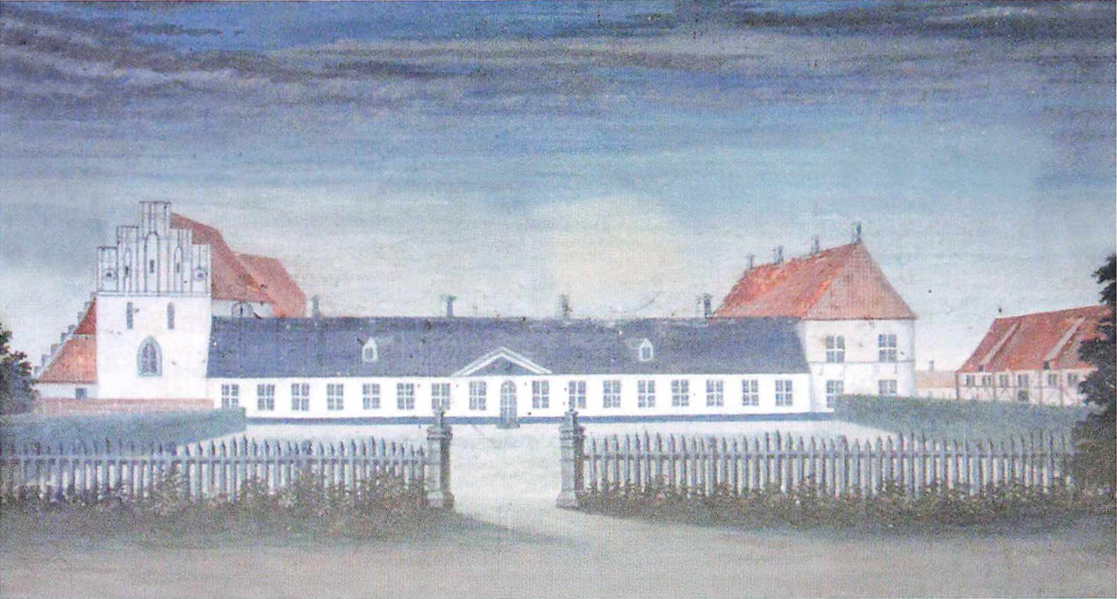
Juellinge in c. 1750.

After Frederik Carl Krag-Juel-Vind-Frijs' death in 1815, Frijsenborg was passed on to his eldest son while the Barony of Juellinge was taken over by his younger son Carl Ludvig Krag-Juel-Vind-Frijs. In 1816, he was granted royal permission to use the title of count in spite of the fact that Juellinges was a barony.

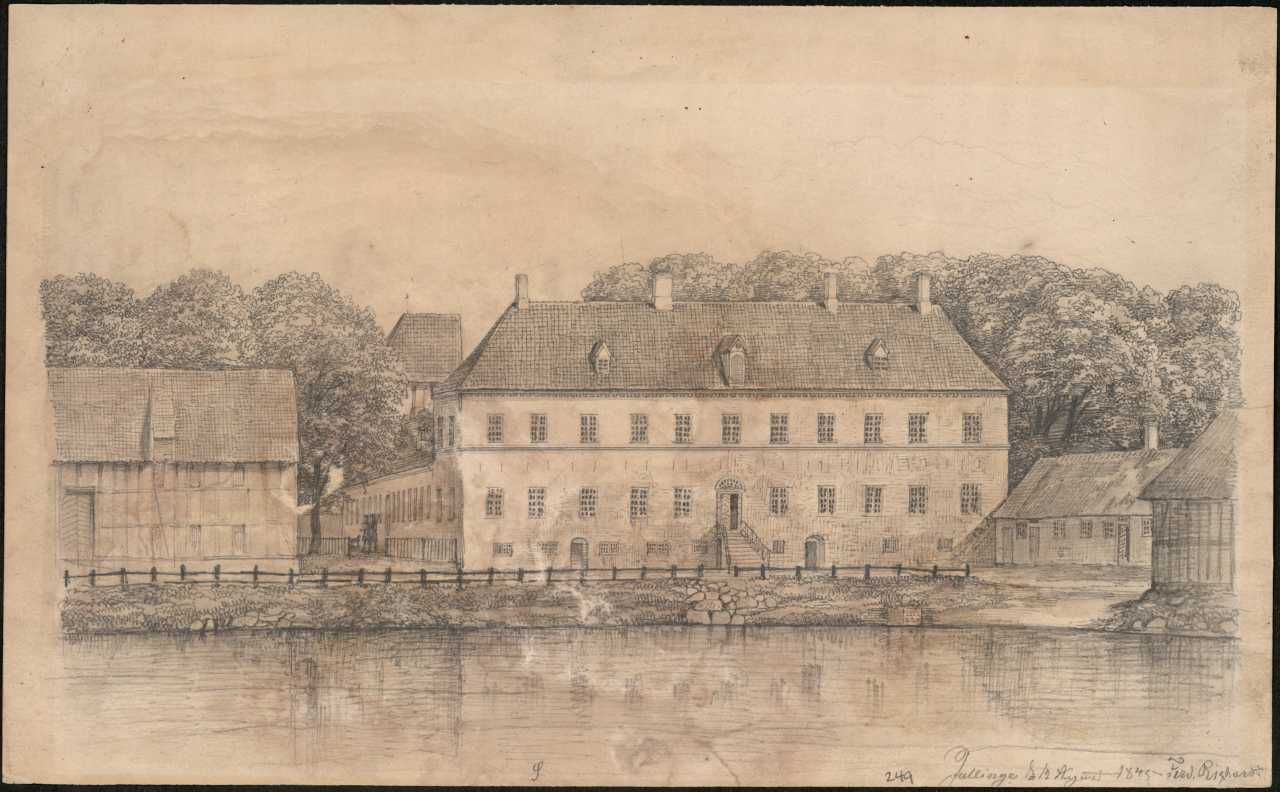
Ferdinand Richardt: Juellinge /1845(

Carl Ludvig Krag-Juel-Vind-Frijs died without children in 1838. Juellinge was therefore endowed to his nephew, Frederik Julius Krag-Juel-Vind-Frijs.

In 1921, the barony was dissolved as a result of the lensafløsningslov of 1919; the name was changed back to Halsted Kloster in 1922. Part of the land was laid out as a golf course in the 1980s.

== Architecture ==
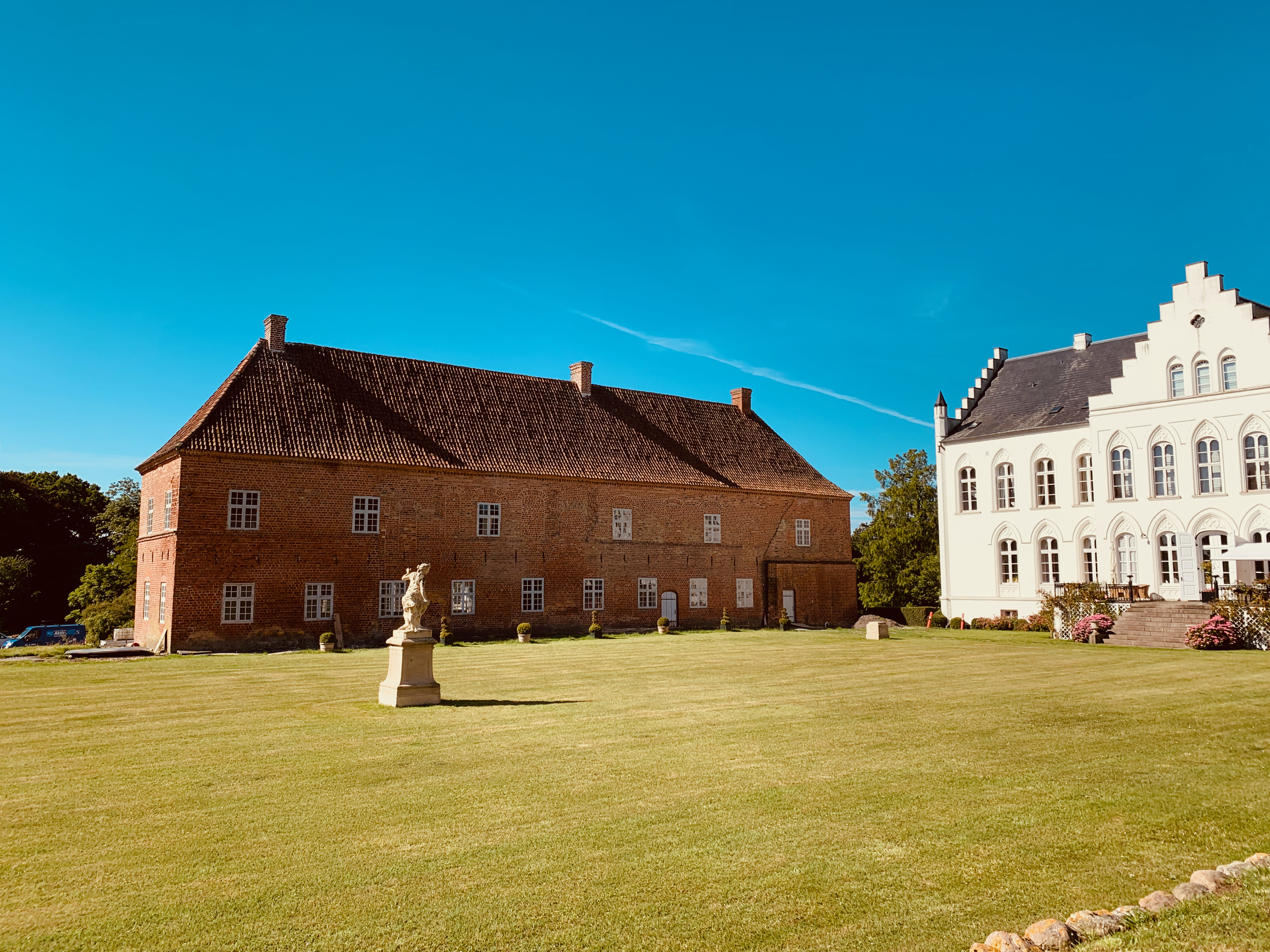
Building

The modern building called Halsted Priory was constructed in 1847–49 with Gothic elements to recall the original building on the site.

Juellinge was sold by the Juel Vind family in 1921 and the name Halsted Priory was restored to the property. Only the church remains of the old monastery complex. It the oldest remaining church on Lolland.

== Today ==
The estate has a total area of 2,347 hectares; of these, 313 hectares belong to the manor. Of the remainder, 1,105 hectares are farmland, 1170 hectares are woodland and 72 hectares are used for other purposes.

The Baroque-style park is open to the public from April through September.

== List of owners ==
- The Crown, 1177–1305
- Halstedkloster, 1305–1538
- The Crown, 1538–1719
- Jens Juel-Vind, 1719–1726
- Jens Krag-Juel-Vind, 1726–1776
- Frederik Carl Krag-Juel-Vind, 1776–1815
- Carl Ludvig Krag-Juel-Vind-Frijs, 1815–1838
- Frederik Julius Krag-Juel-Vind-Frijs, 1838–1885
- Jens Christian Krag-Juel-Vind-Frijs, 1885–1907
- Frederik Krag-Juel-Vind-Frijs, 1907–1926
- Niels Krag-Juel-Vind-Frijs, 1926–1959
- Mogens Krag-Juel-Vind-Frijs, 1959–present
