= Frederik Vind =

Danish landowner (1662–1702)

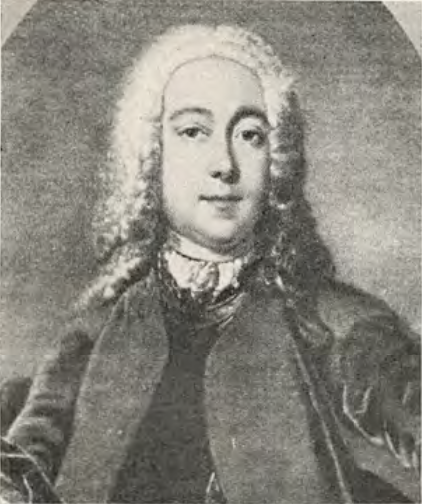
Frederik Vind

Frederik Vind (29 June 1662 – 24 April 1702) was a Danish landowner and Diocesan governor of Aarhus. He owned Harrestedgård on Zealand.

== Early life and education ==
Vind was born on 29 June 1662 to Holger Vind and Margrethe Ovesdatter Vind (née Gjedde). His maternal grandfather was admiral Ove Gjedde. He was the brother of Christian Vind.

== Career ==
In 1683, Vind was appointed secretary in the Danske Kancelli. In 1688, he became a Kammerjunker. 1691 saw him promoted to Chancellery Councillor (virkelig Kancelliraad).

On 27 November 1697, Vind was appointed as country governor (amtmand) of Dronningborg. In the same year, he was awarded the title of etatsråd. On 21 February 1699, he was appointed as diocesan governor of Aarhus as well as country governor of Havreballegaard and Stjernholm counties.

== Property ==
After his father's death, Vind became the owner of Harrestedgård. His mother settled on the estate Gjeddesdal. In 1692, he bought Baggesvogn in Northern Jutland.

== Personal life ==
Vind was married to Sophie Cathrine Juel (1665-1706) on 22 January 1692. She was a daughter of Jens Juel. Their eldest son Jens Juel Vind succeeded his maternal grandfather to the Barony of Juellinge. Neither of their two youngest sons survived childhood.

Vind died on 24 April 1702 in Copenhagen. Harrestedgård was subsequently transferred to his brother Vilhelm Carl Vind.
