= Sophia Magdalena Krag-Juel Vind =

Danish nobility (1734–1810)

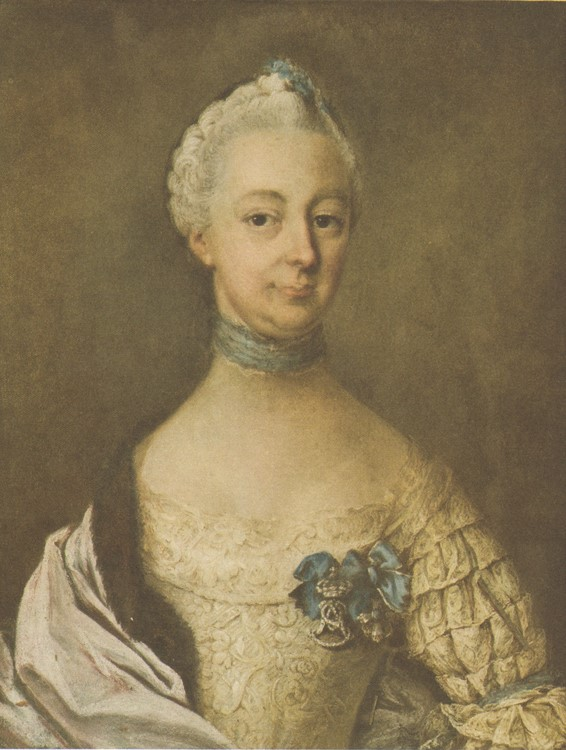
Sophie Magdalene von Gram

Sophia Magdalena Krag-Juel Vind, née von Gram (1734–1810), was a Danish Salon holder, landowner and noble. She is considered to have exerted considerable political influence in Danish politics during the late 18th century.

== Biography ==
She was the daughter of Carl Christian von Gram (1703–80) and Birgitte Christine Friis (1715–75). In 1752, she married the official and landowner Baron Jens Krag-Juel-Vind (1724–1776). She had six children: Frederik Carl (1753), Sophie Magdalene (1754), Juliane Marie (1755), Jens Carl (1757), Jens Carl (1759), and Jens Carl (1767).

She belonged to the elite of the aristocracy around the circles of the royal court: her spouse had several important offices and she herself had been a maid-of-honour to the queen dowager Sophia Magdalene prior to her marriage, and received the L’union parfaite in 1757.

Not much is known of her life before she was widowed in 1776. As a widow, she became the richest landowner of her country, and her house in Copenhagen became the center of the capitals aristocracy. During the 1780s and 1790s, she was the "hostess" of the "danske parti" (The Danish party) consistent of landowners in opposition to the ruling "tyske parti" (German party) of A.P. Bernstorff, Christian Ditlev, Ludvig Reventlow and Ernst Heinrich von Schimmelmann, who ruled Denmark from 1784. She was regarded a powerful enemy of the Reventlow family. In 1790, she was the instigator of proprietærfejde; the Jutian landowning nobility's opposition movement to the new country labor reforms, whose meetings took place at her estate Stensballegård; with her connections, she was regarded a real threat to the ruling government. She continued to be a force of which political actors kept informed.

In 1799, she inherited the county of Frijsenborg after her aunt Elisabeth Sophie Desmercières, and became the biggest landowner in Denmark.

== See also ==
- Christine Sophie Holstein
- Charlotte Schimmelmann
