= Sparekassen for Hjørring By og Omegn =

Former bank in Denmark

- Company type: Savings bank
- Industry: Financial services
- Founded: September 11, 1844
- Defunct: Unknown
- Fate: Merged
- Successor: Spar Nord
- Headquarters: Hjørring, Denmark
- Products: Savings accounts, mortgages

Sparekassen for Hjørring By og Omegn (lit. ' Savings Bank for Hjørring Town and Surroundings') was a savings bank based in Hjørring, Denmark. It was founded on 11 September 1844. The head office was located at Østergade 8.

== Legacy ==
The Bull's Well (Danish: Tyrebrønden) in front of Amtmandsboligen on Brinck Seidelinsgade in Hjørring was donated to Hjørring Municipality by Sparekassen for Hjørring By og Omegn on 26 May 1950 to mark the bank's 100 year anniversary in 1944. It was created by Jan Buhl and unveiled in 1961.
