= Erik Juel =

Danish courtier (1591–1657)

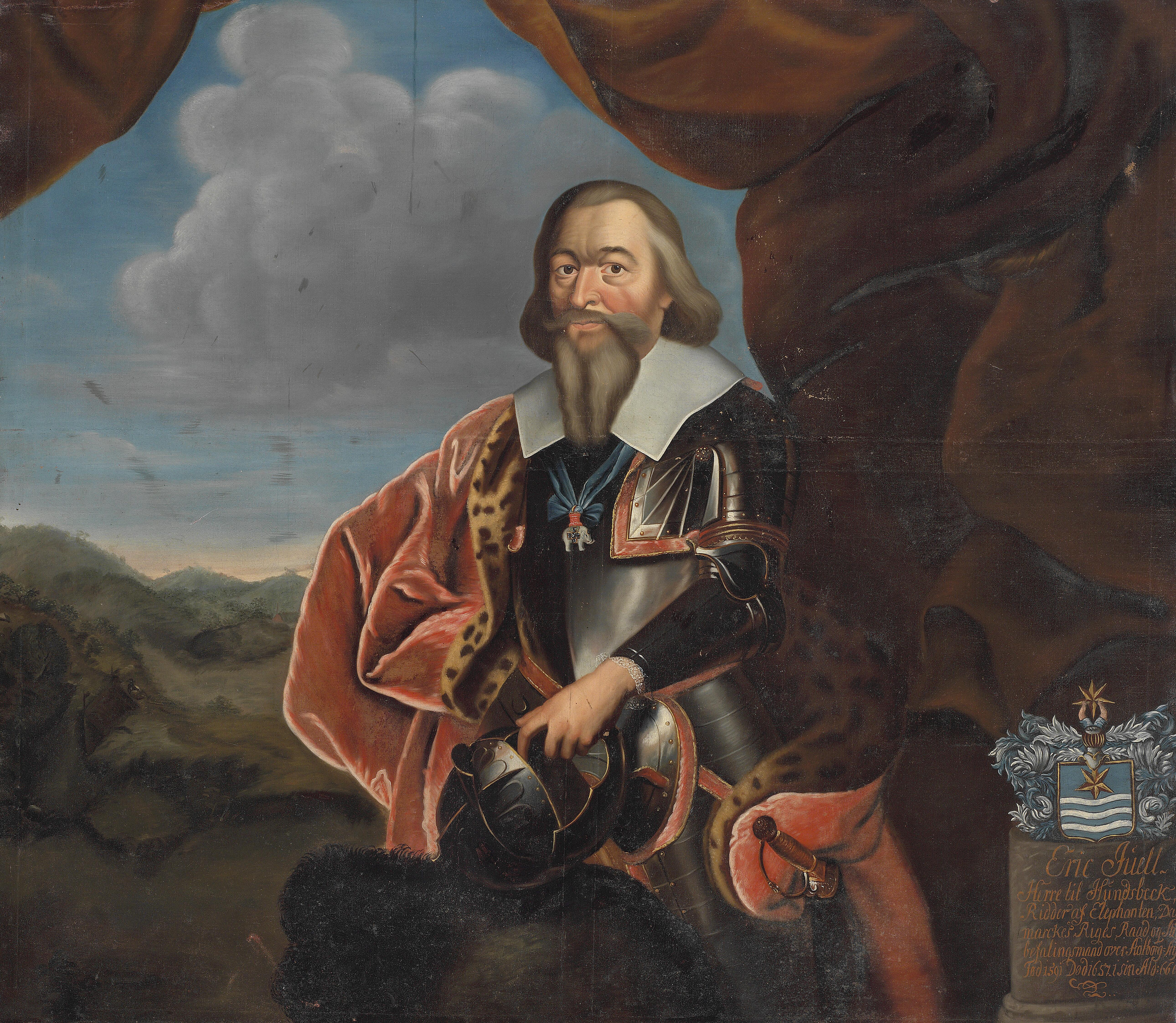
- Portrait of Erik Juel
- Born: 1591; Alsted
- Died: 23 February 1657 (aged 65–66)
- Spouse: Sophie Clausdatter Sehested
- Children: Niels Juel; Jens Juel

Erik Juel, often referred to as Erik Juel to Hundsbæk and Alsted (1591 – 13 February 1657) was a Danish courtier, seignory and Privy Councillor, the father of Admiral Niels Juel and of the politician and diplomat Jens Juel.

== Early life ==
Erik Juel was born in 1591 at Alsted, the son of Peder Juel of the noble Danish Juel family and his wife Margrethe née Ulfstand.

== Career ==
From 1610 to 1616, Juel held the office of secretary to the Danish Chancellery, with a break during the Kalmar War from 1611 to 1613 when he was Hofjunker. During the siege of Kalmar he had a horse shot under him. After the war, in his capacity of secretary of the Chancellery, he was also appointed Canon of Ribe Cathedral.

In 1623, he was appointed provincial judge in Jutland and also held several other local posts and offices. He was granted Gudum Convent by the Crown (until 1651).

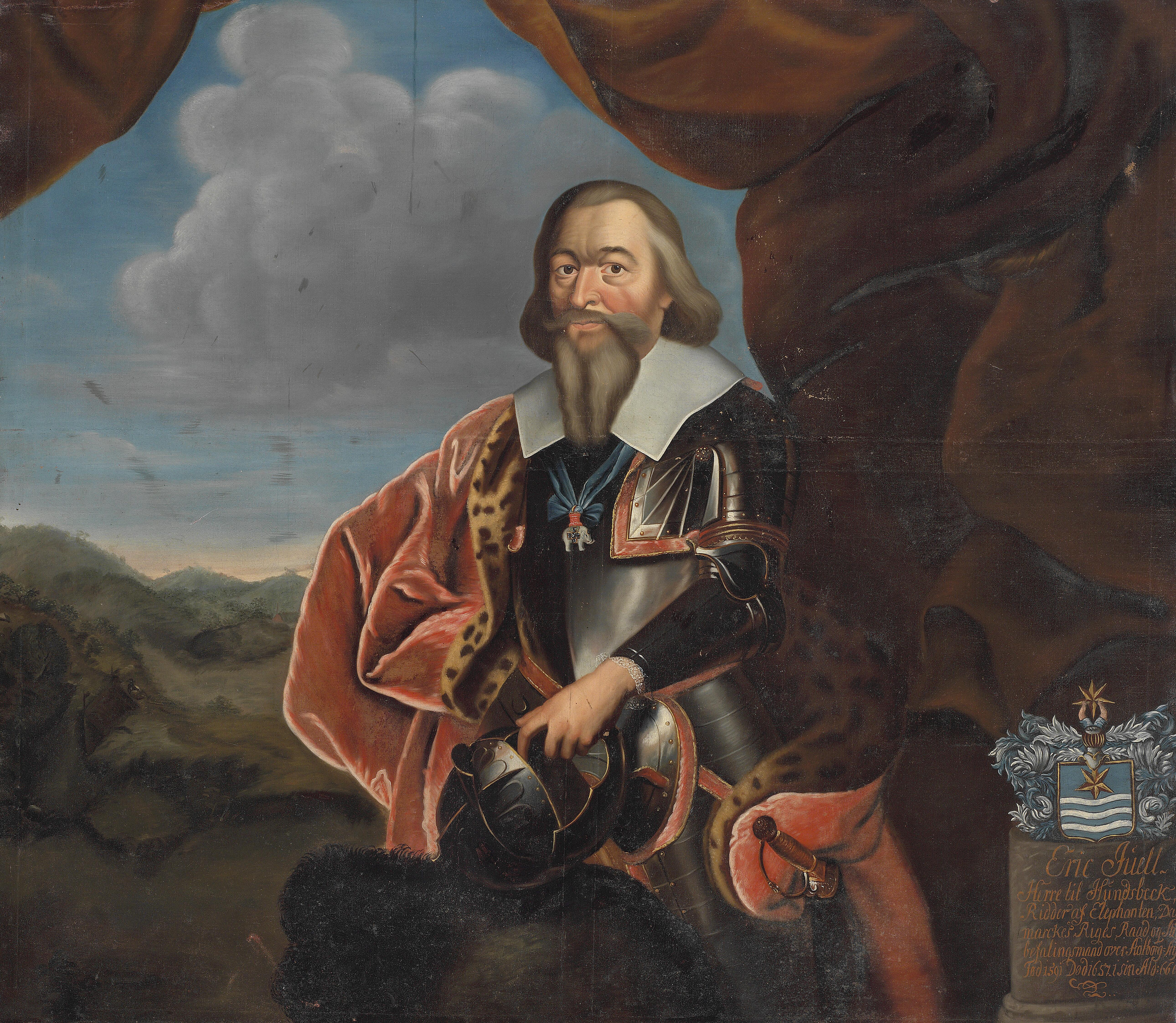
Portrait of Erik Juel.

During the Kejserkrigen, the Danish outshoot of the Thirty Years' War, he had to flee his estates in 1627, travelling to Zealand while his wife and children sought refuge in Norway.

For a while, after the end of the war, he served as the leader of the Jutland nobility at the Provincial Meetings (Provinsmøderne) and was in 1638 and again in 1646 appointed country commissioner. From 1640 to 1646, he was granted Pandumgaard in fee, from 1646 to 1648 Lundenæs and from 1648 to 1657 Aalborghus.

During the Torstenson War, from 1643 to 1645, he was part of the military leadership in Jutland.

In July 1651, he was elected a member of the Privy Council. Not living to see the achievements of his two sons, Niels and Jens Juel, he died on 13 February 1657, aged 65 or 66, leaving his widow in poor financial circumstances .

== Family ==
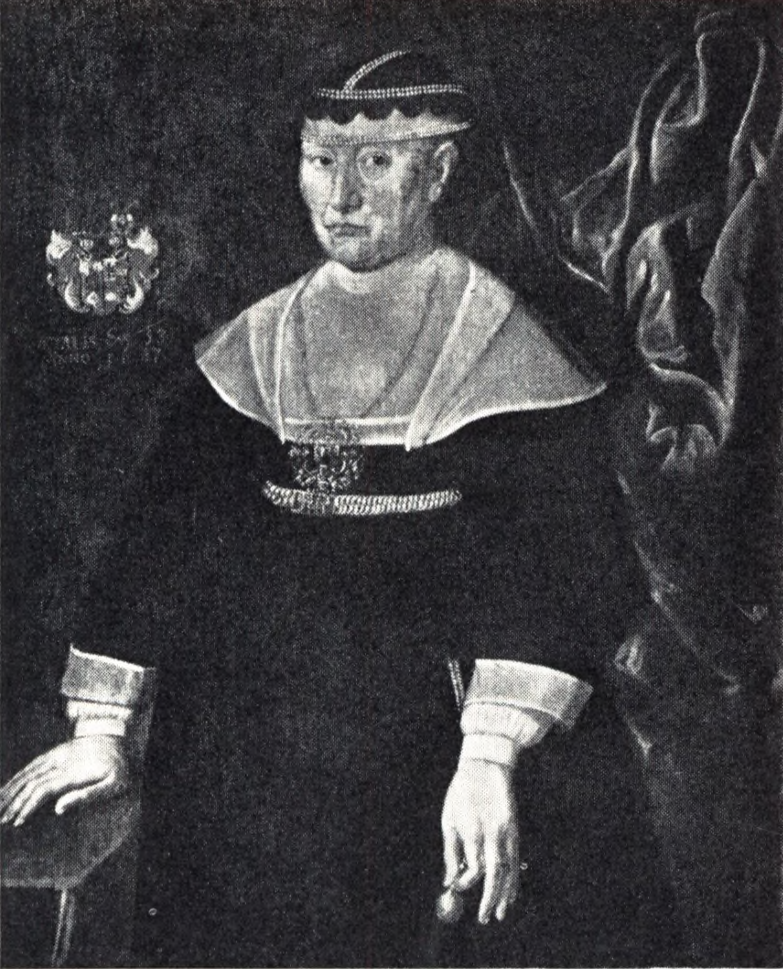
Sophie Sehested.

Erik Juel married Sophie Clausdatter Sehested on 4 October 1618. They had the following children:

- Claus Eriksen Juel (6 March 1621 – 16 November 1673)
- Peder Juel (14 July 1623, Hundsbæk Gods – 9 December 1656, Copenhagen)
- Karen Eriksdatter Juel (14 October 1626, Gudumkloster – 17 October 1656, Kærsholm)
- Niels Juel (8 May 1629, Christiania – 8 April 1697)
- Jens Juel (15 July 1631, Nørtorp Thy – 23 May 1700, Copenhagen)
- Melchior Juel (1634–1678)
- Maren Eriksdatter Juel (7 April 1636, Nørtorp Thy – 1664)
