= Lille Heddinge Rytterskole =

Coordinates: 55.2735°N 12.3894°E

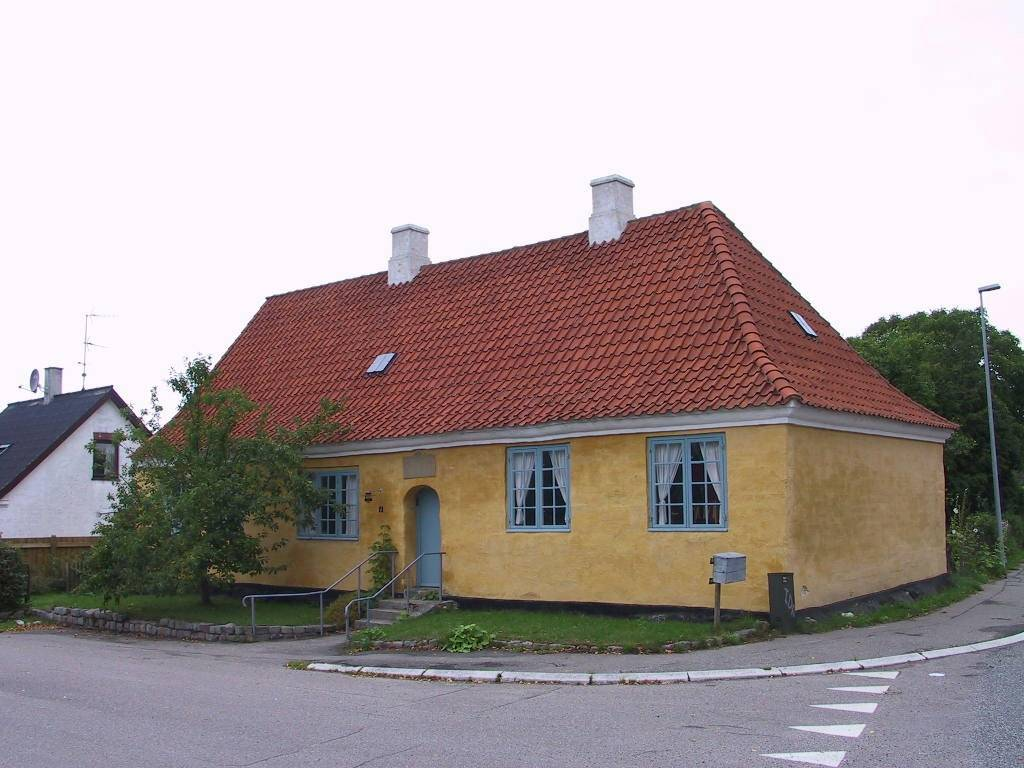
Lille Heddinge Rytterskole

Lille Heddinge Rytterskole is a former rytterskole ("cavalry school") now operated as a school museum in Lille Heddinge, Stevns Municipality, Denmark. It is considered the best preserved of all the surviving schools of its kind and was listed in 1918.

== History ==
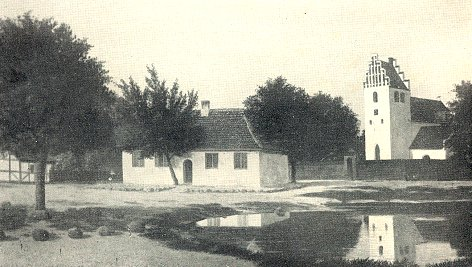
Lille Heddinge Rytterskole

The cavalry schools were built at the initiative of Frederick IV. A total of 240 schools were built between 1722 and 1727 in the 12 new "cavalry districts" (rytterdistrikter). The purpose was to strengthen the Danish cavalry. The school at Lille Heddinge was built in 1722.

Bishop Nicolai Edinger Balle (1744–1816) visited the school in 1786 and again in 1791 and on 23 July 1894.

It was decommissioned after a new school was built at Skørpingevej in 1892. The building was later used as a community centre, a storage building and a private residence. It was restored by Stevns Municipality from 1973 to 1976 and subsequently operated as a school museum by Østsjællands Museer.

== Teachers ==
- (1751?) ? Normann
- (175?–1757) Rasmus Munch
- (1757–1761) Johan Christian Westhen
- (1761–1762) ? Carlé
- (1762–1781) Mickael Hartmann
- (1781–1826) Christian Seest
- (1826–1868) Johan Frederik Dettmer
- (1868–1890) H. P. S. Petersen
- (1890–1892) N. Jensen
