= Jens Juel (diplomat) =

Danish diplomat (1631–1700)

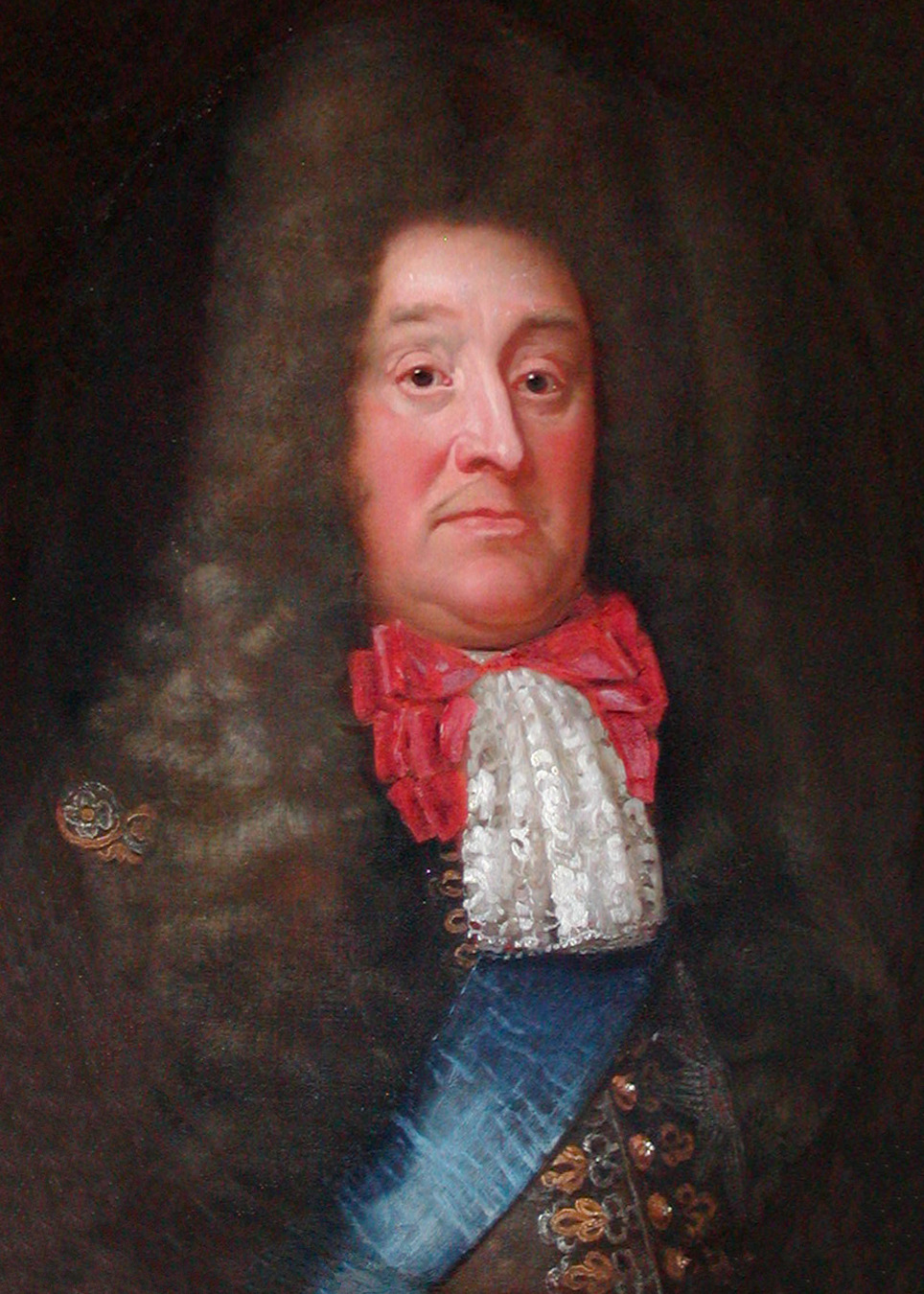

Baron of Juellinge
- In office 1672–1700

Personal details
- Born: 15 July 1631
- Died: 23 May 1700 (aged 68)
- Parents: Erik Juel (father); Sophie Sehested (mother)
- Occupation: diplomat

Jens Juel (15 July 1631 – 23 May 1700) was a Danish diplomat and statesman of great influence at the Danish–Norwegian court. He was created Baron and granted Juellinge in 1672 and also established Juellund in 1694. He was the brother of Admiral Niels Juel.

== Biography ==
The son of Erik Juel and Sophie Sehested, both descendants of Danish noble families, Jens Juel was born on 15 July 1631 at Nørtorp, an estate in Thy in the north of Jutland. He studied at Sorø Academy and then set out on a four years journey abroad to further his education. There he met Count Christian Rantzau in Vienna and started a diplomatic career when he accompanied him to the Reichstag in Regensburg in 1652. In August 1657 Juel was appointed Ambassador to Poland, and though he failed to prevent King John Casimir from negotiating separately with Sweden, he was made a privy councillor on his return home.

But it was the reconciliation of Juel's uncle Hannibal Sehested with King Frederick III which secured Juel's future. As Sehested's representative, he concluded the peace of Copenhagen with Charles X, and after the Danish revolution of 1660 was appointed Danish minister at Stockholm, where he remained for eight years. Subsequently, the chancellor Peder Griffenfeld, who had become warmly attached to him, sent him in 1672, and again in 1674, as ambassador extraordinary to Sweden, ostensibly to bring about a closer union between the two northern kingdoms, but really to give time to consolidate Griffenfeld's far-reaching system of alliances.

Juel completely sympathized with Griffenfeld's Scandinavian policy, which aimed at weakening Sweden sufficiently to re-establish something like an equilibrium between the two states. Like Griffenfeld, Juel also feared, above all things, a Swedo-Danish war. After the unlucky Scanian War of 1675–79, Juel was one of the Danish plenipotentiaries who negotiated the peace of Lund. Even then he was for an alliance with Sweden "till we can do better". This policy he consistently followed, and was largely instrumental in bringing about the marriage of Charles XI to Christian V's daughter Ulrike Eleonora. But for the death of the like-minded Swedish statesman Johan Gyllenstierna in June 1680, Juel's Scandinavian policy might have succeeded, to the infinite advantage of both kingdoms. He represented Denmark at the coronation of Charles XII (December 1697), when he concluded a new treaty of alliance with Sweden. Between 1697 and 1699, there was a Danish policy to create an alliance with Sweden through a double wedding between Charles XII of Sweden and Princess Sophia Hedwig of Denmark, and Prince Charles of Denmark and Hedvig Sophia of Sweden (after the marriage of Hedvig Sophia of Sweden in 1698, she was replaced by Ulrika Eleonora of Sweden). Jens Juel was very active in this affair. However, none of the marriages was materialized. He died in 1700.

Juel, a man of very few words and a sworn enemy of phrasemaking, was perhaps the shrewdest and most cynical diplomat of his day. His motto was: We should wish for what we can get. Throughout life he regarded the political situation of Denmark with absolute pessimism. She was, he often said, the cats-paw of the Great Powers. While Griffenfeld would have obviated this danger by an elastic political system, adaptable to all circumstances, Juel preferred seizing whatever he could get in favorable conjunctures. In domestic affairs Juel was at adherent of the mercantile system, and labored vigorously for the industrial development of Denmark and Norway. For an aristocrat of the old school he was liberally inclined, but only favored petty reforms, especially in agriculture, while he regarded emancipation of the serfs as quite impracticable. Juel made no secret of his preference for absolutism, and was one of the few patricians who accepted the title of baron. He saw some military service during the Scanian War, distinguishing himself at the siege of Vänersborg, and by his swift decision at the critical moment materially contributing to his brother Niels Juel's naval victory in the Battle of Køge Bay. To his great honor he remained faithful to Griffenfeldt after his fall, enabled his daughter to marry handsomely, and did his utmost, though in vain, to obtain the ex-chancellor's release from his dungeon.
