= Bavelse =

Manor house in Denmark

- Interactive map of the Bavelse area

General information
- Location: Skovridervej 11. 4171 Glumsø, Denmark
- Coordinates: 55°20′10.32″N 11°38′39.48″E
- Completed: 1845

Bavelse is a manor house situated on the north side of Bavelse Lake, between Næstved and Sorø, in Næstved Municipality, about 70 km (43 mi) south of Copenhagen, Denmark. Since 1710, Bavelse and the nearby estate Næsbyholm have had the same owners. Bavelse's present main building was constructed for Christian Rønnenkamp in 1845. The Næsbyholm-Bavelse estate covers 1,424 hectares of land (2012).

== History ==
=== Early history ===
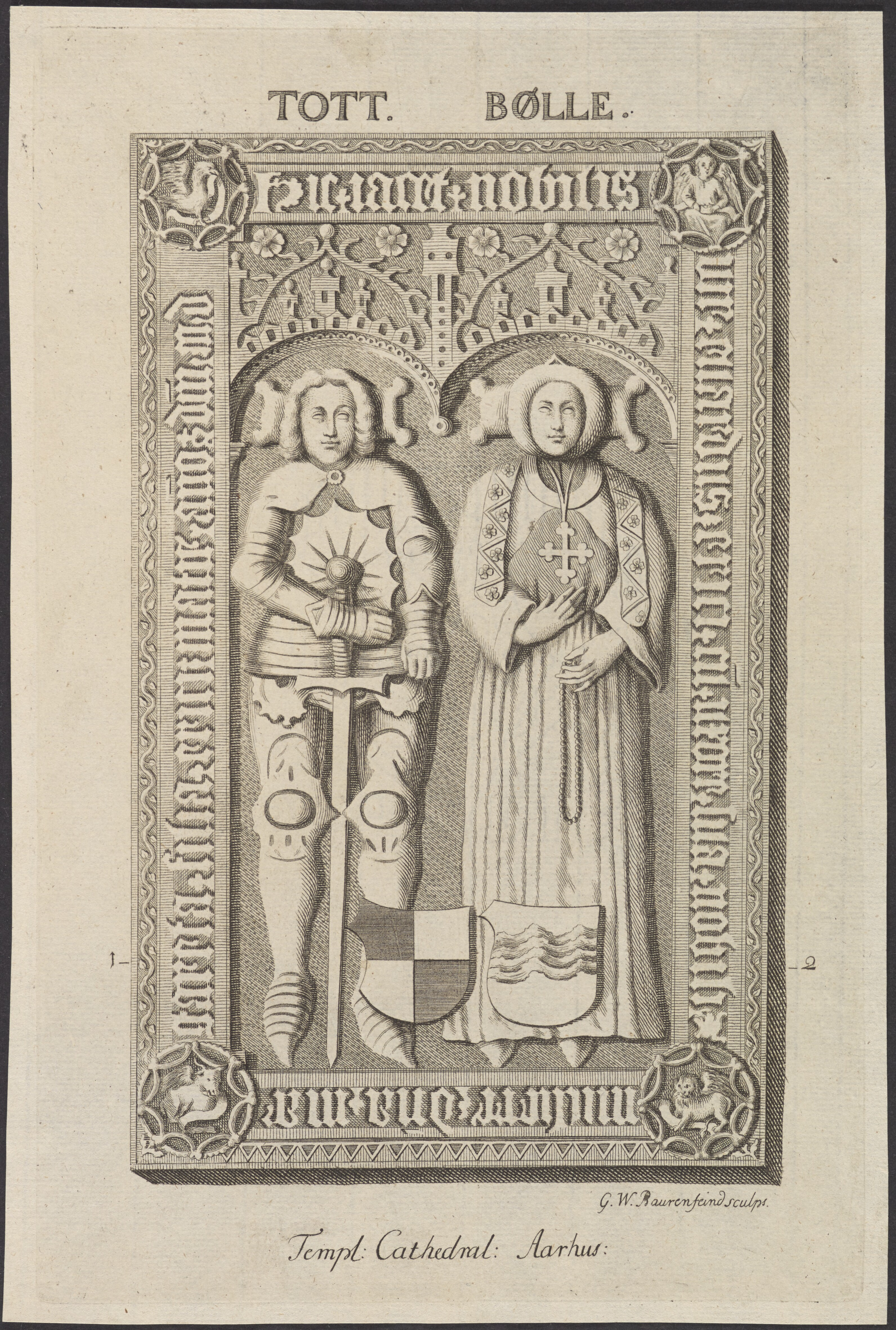
Ledgerstone of Evert Thott and his wife Margrethe Bølle.

The first known owner of Bavelse is Olaf Glug. He may have served as cup-bearer for Valdemar II (1170–1241).

The estate was later owned by members of the Moltke family. Evert Moltke was married to Helene of Bjernede. In a surviving document, written in Latin, from 1383, she transferred the estate to her son Henneke Johan Moltke. On his death, Bavelse passed to his sons Evert and Mathias Moltke. Evert Moltke was married to Beatre Rønnow. Their daughter and only child Evertsdatter Moltke was married to Erik Aagesen Thott. He inherited Bavelse upon his father-in-law's death in 1454. Erik and Beatre Thott had four children. After Erik Andersen Thott's death in 1494, Bavelse passed into the joint ownership of his son Erik Eriksen Thott (died childless) and son-in-law Herman Flemming. In 1509, Herman Flemming ceded the estate to his elder son Erik Hermansen Flemming. He died on 16 October 1534. Bavelse was then passed to his younger brother Jacob Flemming, who was married to Maren Mogensdatter Juul, daughter of Mogens Pallesen Juel Udstrup and Dorthe Mogensdatter Krabbe. Jacob and Maren had only one child, a daughter, Anna Jacobsdatter Flemming (1544–1570), which made Jacob Fleming the last male member of his family. He eventually died in 1544.

=== Ulfeldt family ===
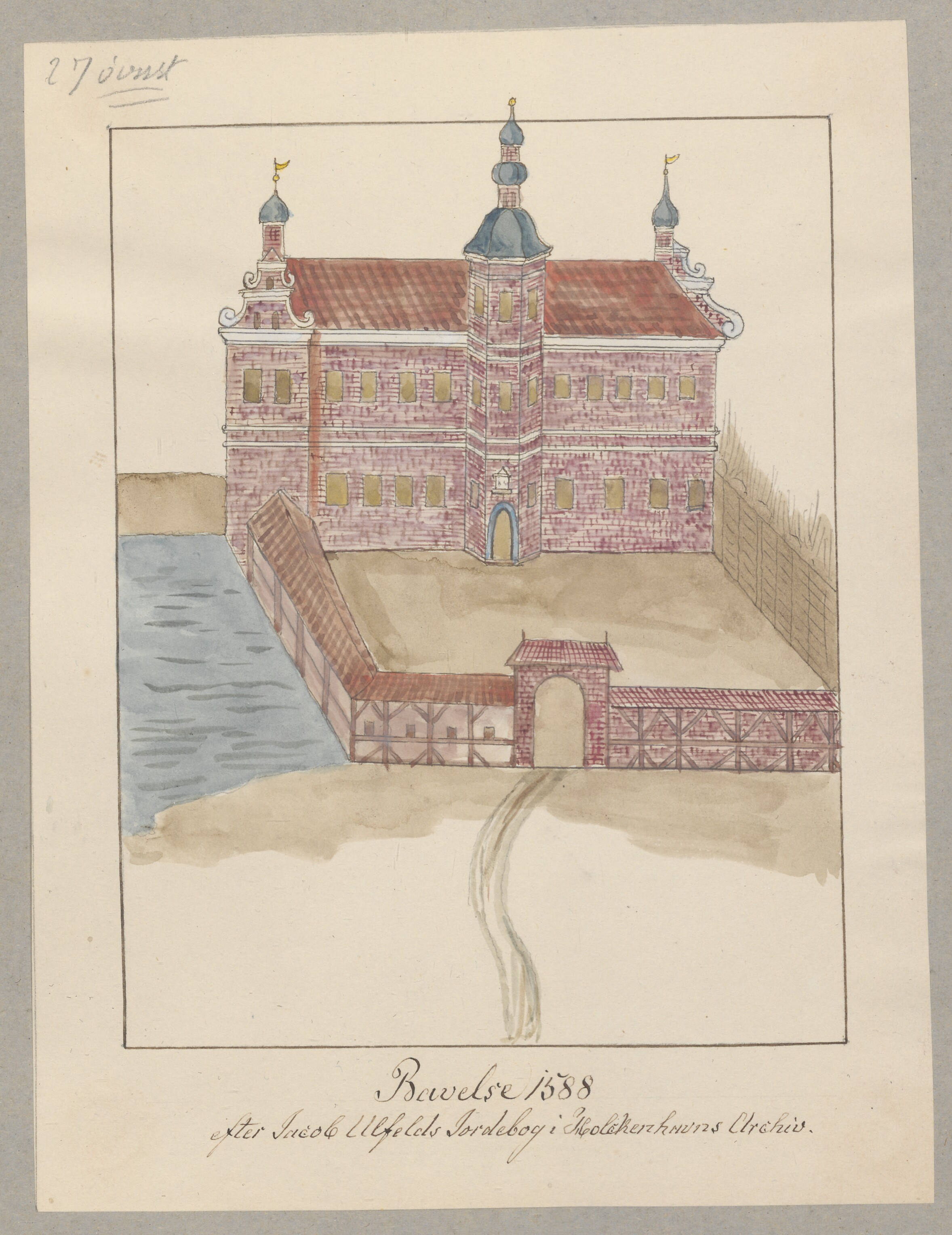
Ulfeldt's new main building, 1588

In 1562, Anne Jacobsdatter Flemming was married to Jacob Ulfeldt who inherited, in 1566, the estates Kongsbølle (later Ulfeldtsholm) on Funen and Selsø in Hornsherred. He is remembered for his very troubled diplomatic journey into Russia in 1578, during which he concluded a treaty with Tsar Ivan IV (1530–1584), that brought him to disgrace at home. On his return to Denmark, he was thrown out of the privy council and lost all his royal fiefs. This prompted him to settle on his estates more permanently and he did much to improve their management. He increased their size through the acquisition of more land and the construction of new buildings. The new main building on the Bavelse estate was completed in 1588. The building was most likely designed by Hans van Steenwinckel the Elder.

Jacob Ulfeldt died in 1593. Bavelse was then passed to his youngest son Corfitz Ulfeldt (1559–1614). On his death in 1614, Bavelse was passed to his son Jacob Ulfeldt (died 1631). In 1620, he took over the management of the estate. In 1724, he was appointed as district judge (landsdommer) of Zealand and was at the same time granted Ringsted Abbey as a fief. He gave up his position as district judge in 1630 and died the following year. He was heavily in debt at the time of his death. Bavelse was passed on to his son Corfitz Ulfeldt (1623–1590). In 1647, he had to sell Bavelse to his uncle Oluf Daa. In 1648, Bavelse was acquired by Corfitz Ulfeldt, a cousin of the former owner by the same name who had died in 1614.

In 1661, Ulfeldt had to transfer Bavelse and most of his other estates to the crown in return for his release.

=== Christoffer and Ermegaard Gabel ===
The war with Sweden had left its mark on the estate. The main building had fallen into a state of disrepair and 12 of the farms in the village had been burnt or were left empty. Bavelse was initially sold to several owners. In 1667, Christoffer Gabel became the sole owner of the estate. In 1664, he was appointed as Governor of Copenhagen. He placed more of the land directly under the manor. The estate was owned by his widow Ermegaard Badenhaupt on his death. In 1794. she was granted permission to close down the rest of the village.

Bavelse was later owned by Frederik Gabel and then by Valdemar Gabel.

=== A royal affair, 1709–1720 ===
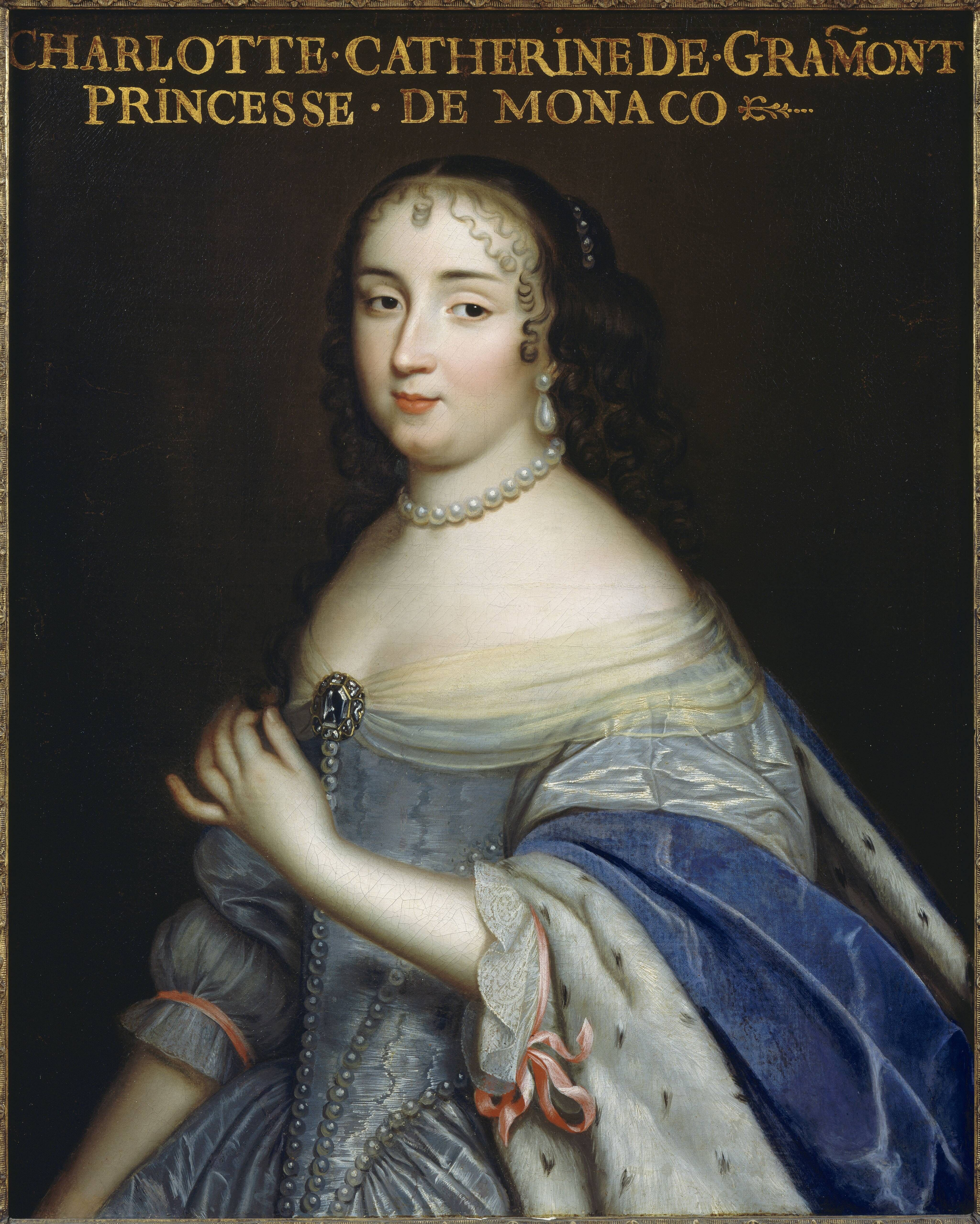
Catherine Charlotte de Gramont

In 1709 and 1710, Næsbyholm and nearby Bavelse were acquired by Frederik IV for his mistress, Charlotte Helene von Schindel, who was given the title Countess of Frederiksholm. The relationship ended in 1711; Frederick entered into his relationship with Anne Sophie Reventlow and ordered Charlotte Helene von Schindel to leave court for her estate in Själland. She initially stopped at Fyn and claimed to be pregnant with Frederick's child, but the pregnancy turned out to be false. Charlotte Helene von Schindel hosted a vivid social life at her estate and entered into a relationship with the noble Ernst G. Bülow, with whom she had a child. The couple tried to conceal the birth, but when the monarch was informed, they were given permission to marry, and did so on 9 February 1716. Næstbyholm and Bavelse reverted to the crown when the countship was dissolved.

A new 19-bays-long, two-storey half-timbered main building had been constructed on the estate in 1708. Ulfeldt's old main building was demolished in 1718, most likely by Swedish prisoners of war.

=== Changing owners, 1720–1836 ===
In 1720, Næsbyholm and Bavelse were sold to Peder Thott. He was succeeded on the estate by his son Otto Thott.

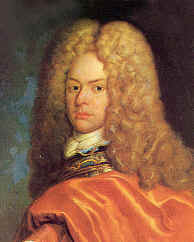
Christian Sigfred von Plessen

Christian Sigfred von Plessen, the younger half-brother of Carl Adolph von Plessen and Christian Ludvig von Plessen, purchased Næsbyholm and Bevelse from Otto Thott's daughters in 1723.

In 1645, Næsbyholm and Bavelse were acquired by Johan Ludvig Holstein and incorporated in the countship of Ledreborg. In 1775, Johan Ludvig Holstein sold Næsbyholm and Bavelse to Carl Adolph Raben. His son, Frederik Sophus Raben, sold the estates in 1804.

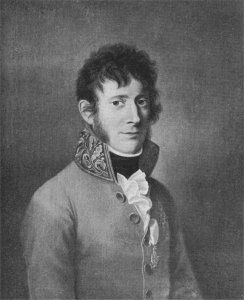
Christian Conrad Sophus Danneskiold-Samsøe

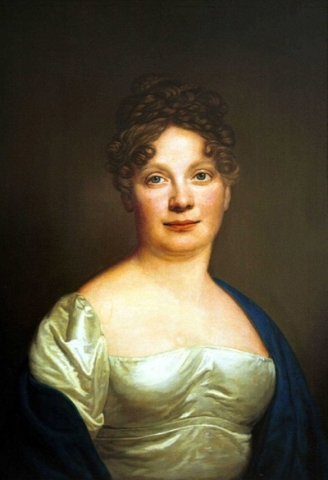
Henriette Valentine Danneskiold-Samsøe

The new owner, Christian Conrad, Count of Danneskiold-Samsøe, was a very industrious landowner. He also purchased the estates Holmegaard, Ravnstrup, Nordfeld, Aalebæksgaard and Rosendal. He embraced new legislation for rural affairs and went further than the law required. He encouraged forestry and horticulture on his domains. To facilitate transportation of timber from his forest at Næsbyholm, he canalized the Suså River from Bavelse to Næstved. This "Danneskiold Canal" was inaugurated on 11 September 1812. Danneskiold-Samsøe was, however, hit hard by the agricultural crisis that followed the war with England and the national bankruptcy of 1813. The government took over his estates one year after his death.

=== 1836–present: Rønnenkamp family ===
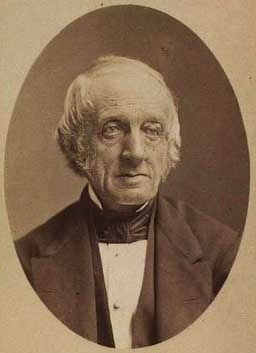
Christian Rønnenkamp

In 1836, Bavelse and Næsbyholm were sold at auction for 400,000 rigsdaler to Christian Rønnenkamp. He had made a fortune as a wholesale merchant and sugar manufacturer in Copenhagen as well as on speculative investments during the war years. He now settled on his estates and managed them himself. His home in Copenhagen was at Amaliegade 4.

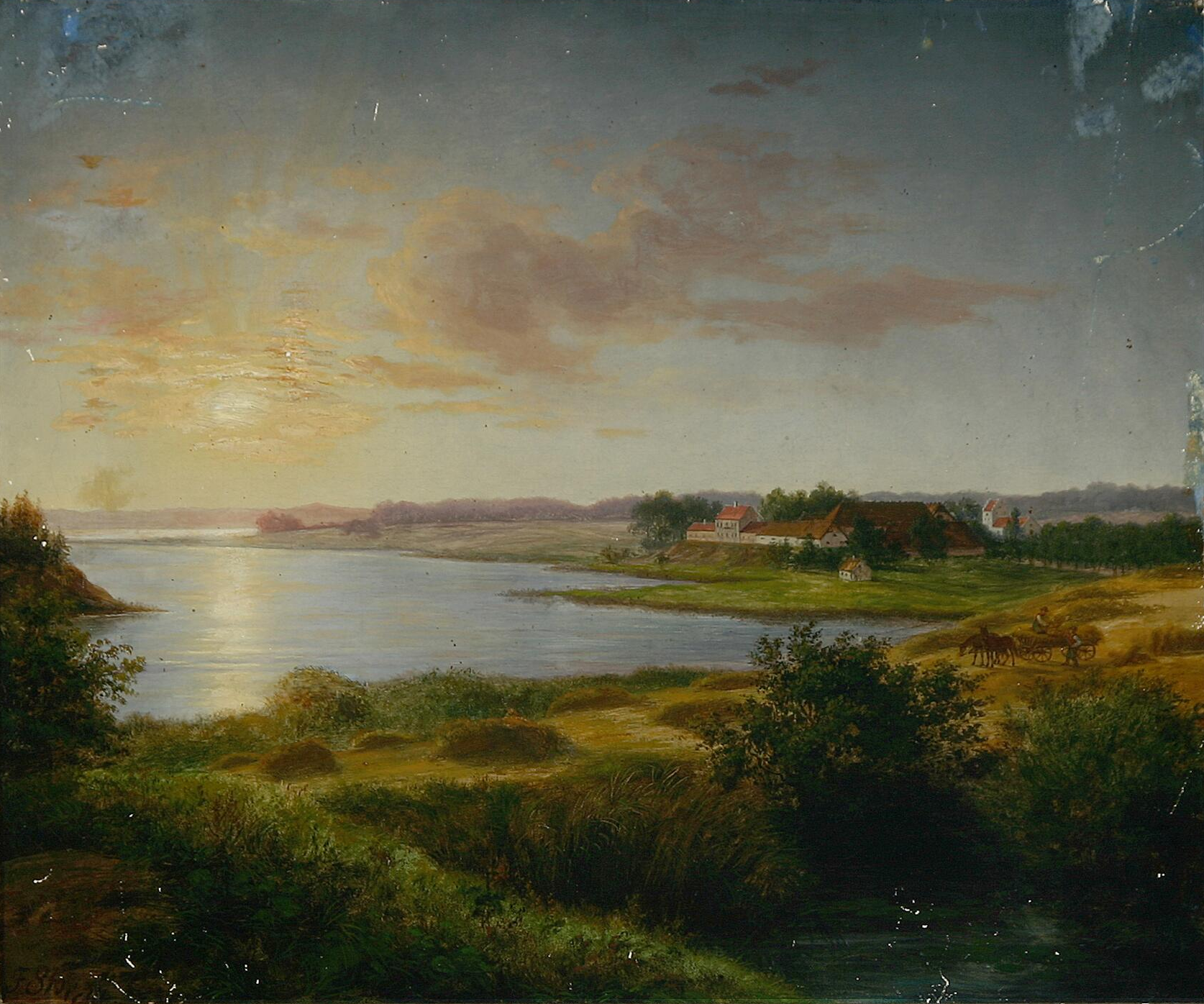
Painting of Bavelse in the middle of the 19th century.

In 1845, Rønnenkamp constructed a new main building on the Bavelse estate. He had no children and therefore left his estates to his sister's grandson, Peter Christian Howden (1854–1930), who assumed the last name Howden-Rønnenkamp. In 1910, Howden-Rønnenkamp's eldest daughter Jessy (1887–1954) married Mogens Holck (1885–). They resided at Holck's estate Holckenhavn but would later use Næsbyholm as a summer residence. In 1948, Jessy Holck ceded Næsbyholm-Bavelse to her son Mogens Preben Christian Eiler Holck. He owned it until 1975.

Mogens Holck resided at Bavelse in 2013. Næsbyholm was let out to Birte Hemmer and Stine Hemmer-Havnsgaard, who ran it as a hotel.

== Architecture ==
The plastered, Neoclassical house consists of a two-storey Corps de logis with a half-hipped black slate roof, flanked by two one-storey secondary service wings.

== List of owners ==
- ( – )Oluf Glug
- ( – ) Margrethe Olufsdatter Moltke née Glug
- ( –1383) Helene af Bjernede
- (1383– ) Henneke Johan Moltke
- ( – ) Evert Moltke
- ( – ) Mathias Moltke
- ( –1494) Erik Aagesen Thott
- (1494– ) Erik Eriksen Thott
- (1494–1509) Herman Flemming
- (1509–1534) Erik Hermansen Flemming
- (1534–1544) Jacob Hermansen Flemming
- (1544) Anne Jacobsdatter Ulfeldt née Flemming
- (1544–1593) Jacob Ulfeldt
- (1593–1614) Corfitz Ulfeldt
- (1614–1631) Jacob Ulfeldt
- (1631–1646) Corfitz Ulfeldt
- (1646–1647) Oluf Daa
- (1647–1661) Corfitz Ulfeldt
- (1661–1664) The Crown
- (1664) Peter Holmer
- (1664–1667) Casper von Buchwaldt
- (1664–1667) Johan Banniermann
- (1667–1673) Christoffer Gabel
- (1673–1699) Ermegard Gabel née Badenhaupts
- (1699–1703) Frederik Gabel
- (1699–1703) Valdemar Gabel
- (1703–1705) Hans Albrecht Hæseker
- (1705– ) Herman Schøller
- (1705– ) Christine Schøller
- ( –1710) Engel Gottfried v. Bülow
- (1710–1711) Kronen
- (1711–1716) Charlotte Helene von Schindel
- ( – ) Petra Sophie Reedtz-Thott
- ( –1723) Peder Thott
- ( –1723) Anne Thott
- ( –1723) Dorothea Thott
- ( –1723) Otto Thott
- (1723–1756) Christian Sigfred von Plessen
- (1756–1763) Johan Ludvig Holstein
- (1763–1775) Christian Frederik von Holstein
- (1775– ) Carl Adolph Raben
- ( –1804) Frederik Sophus Raben
- (1804–1823) Christian Conrad Sophus Danneskiold-Samsøe
- (1823–1824) Boet efter C. C. S. af Danneskiold-Samsøe*
- (1824–1837) the State
- (1837–1867) Christian Rønnenkamp
- (1867– ) Jessy Caroline Rønnenkamp née Howden
- ( –1930) Christian Howden-Rønnekamp
- (1930–1948) Jessy Holck née Howden-Rønnenkamp
- (1948–1975) Mogens Preben Christian-Eiler Howden-Rønnenkamp Holck
- (1975– ) Karl Mogens Howden-Rønnenkamp Holck
- (2019– ) Peter Christian Eiler Wilhelm Howden-Rønnenkamp Holck
