= Amaliegade 4 =

Building in Copenhagen, Denmark

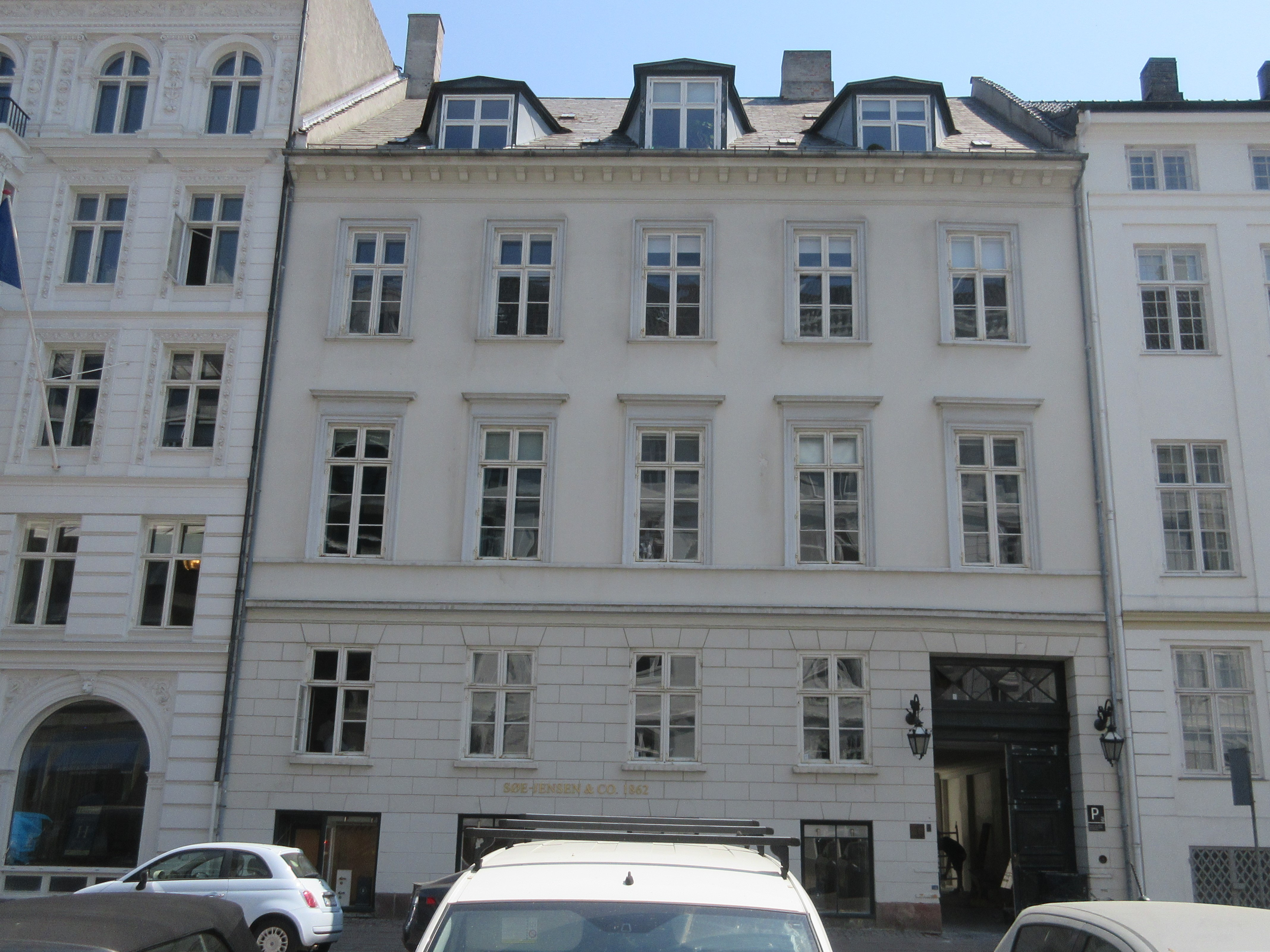
- Interactive map of the Amaliegade 4 area

General information
- Location: Copenhagen, Denmark
- Coordinates: 55°40′54.86″N 12°35′30.67″E
- Completed: 1829

Amaliegade 4 is a historic property located in the Frederiksstaden Quarter of central Copenhagen, Denmark. It was built for sugar manufacturer Christian Rønnenkamp in 1829 and was listed on the Danish Registry of Protected Buildings and Places in 1950. Other notable former residents include politician Christian Albrecht Bluhme and painter Viggo Johansen.

== History ==
=== St. Croix Sugar House ===
The site was originally part of the large corner property (Sankt Annæ Plads 18). In the new cadastre of 1756, the property was listed as No. 71 P. It was by then owned by Johan Just Bradt. On Christian Gedde's map of St. Ann's East Quarter, the property was marked as No. 323.

A sugar refinery known as St. Croix Sugar House was in approximately 1783 established at the site by Østersøisk-guineisk Handelsselskab. The sugar refinery was by 1787 managed by Niels Nielsen Hald. He lived in one of the apartments of the corner building with his five children (aged two to 14), a maid, three sugar refinery workers (svend)) and nine apprentices. Jeppe Prætorius was by 1787 among the residents.

The company was liquidated in 1787. The sugar refinery was continued by new owners but closed during the economic crisis of the war with England and the bombardment of Copenhagen in 1807.

=== Christian Rønnenkamp ===
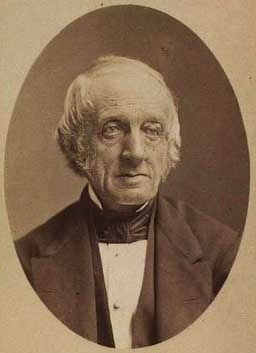
Christian Rønnenkamp

The property was sold in a public auction to Christian Rønnenkamp who already owned a sugar refinery in Dronningens Tværgade. The present building on the site (Amaliegade 4) was constructed for him in 1828-29. He both had his home in, and ran his business from, the new building. His sugar products were sold from a retail outlet on the ground floor.

In 1835, Rønnenkamp purchased the estates of Næsbygård and Bavelse from the Danish government. He then sold his property in Copenhagen and the sugar refinery closed, but at least in the beginning he seems to have experimented with cultivation of sugar beets on his new estates.

=== 1834 census ===
The property was home to 30 residents in six households at the 1734 census. Barbara Rosenkrantz født Prinsesse Af Wiasemskoj, a widow, resided on the ground floor with her niece Mathilde Rosenkrantz, her lady's companion Emilie Labott, two male servants and three maids. Antoinette Wleugel (née Dorrien), widow of counter admiral Cornelius Wleugel, resided on the first floor with her daughter Caroline Wleugel, husjomfru Christiane Wolbye, a female cook, one male servant and one maid. Johannes Johansen, a commander in the Royal Danish Nacy, resided on the second floor with his wife Anna Johansen, a female cook, one male servant and one maid. Lars Petersen, a beer seller (øltaooer), resided in the basement with his wife Elisabeth Petersen and two daughters (aged 16 and 21). Christopher Korring, a workman, resided in the cross wing with his wife Enge Nielsen, their five-year-old daughter and the stableman Hans Jacob. Peter Jensen, a concierge, resided in the basement with his wife Karen Lorentzen and their five-year-old son.

=== 1845–1900 ===
The only residents of the building at the 1845 census were the concierge Georg Koefoed, his wife Sophie Koefoed, their two daughters (aged one and six) and one lodger.

Count Carl von Moltke was a resident of the building for around a year in 1855. His next home was at, Amaliegade 17. Frederik Marcus Knuth, Count of Knuthenborg, had his last cith home in the building. He died on 8 January 1856.

Former prime minister Christian Albrecht Bluhme lived at Amaliegade 4 in 1862–63.

The property was for a while owned by the lawyer Edouard Buntzen (1809-1885). He was married to Anna Sophie Laurenzia (Laura) Nissen (1820-1874). The property was after his death owned by his daughter Andreas Camilla Buntzen (1849-1897). The painter Viggo Johansen lived in the building from 1895 to 1900.

=== 20th century ===
The company Valeur & Jensens was based in the building in 1901.

The building was owned by Arnold Louis Henri Gameél (1848-) in 1908. He was employed in the firm A. C. Gamél. He was a board member of Københavns Asylselskab. He was the son of Antoine Cyrelle Gamél.

The retired politician and managing director Tyge Rothe (1877-1970) resided at Amaliegade 4B from 1941 to 1963.

N. Schiøtt & Hochbrandt, a shipping company, acquired the building in 1950 and made it their new headquarters.

== Architecture ==
Amaliegade 4 consists of three storeys and a cellar and is five bays wide. A gateway on the right side of the building opens to a long, narrow courtyard. An 11-bay side wing (No. 4B) of the same age as the main wing extends along the north side of the courtyard. At the bottom of the courtyard is a four-bay rear wing (No. 4C) which dates from before 1828. The entire complex was listed on the Danish Registry of Protected Buildings and Places in 1950.

== Today ==
The building is now owned by E/F Amaliegade 4 and used as office space.
