= Næsbyholm =

Manor house near Glumsø, Denmark

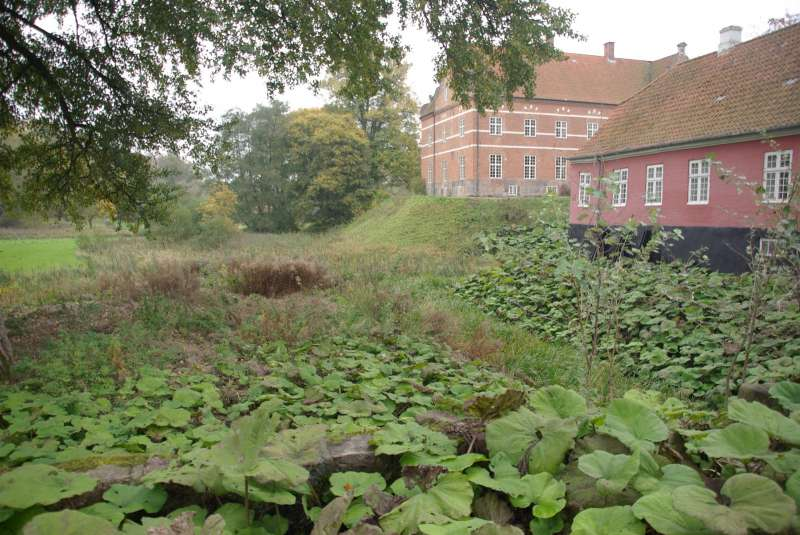
- Interactive map of the Næsbyholm area

General information
- Location: Næsbyholm Allé 11; 171 Glumsø, Denmark
- Coordinates: 55°22′12″N 11°36′0″E

Næsbyholm is a manor house and estate located east of Tybjerg Lake, between Sorø and Glumsø, in Næstved Municipality, some 70 km (43 mi) southwest of Copenhagen, Denmark. Since 1610, Næsbyholm and Bavelse have had the same owners. The three-winged Dutch Renaissance-style main building was reconstructed after fires in 1932 and 1947, incorporating elements from 1585. It is now used as a venue for weddings, conferences and other events. The scenic park was laid out in the 18th century. The Næsbyholm-Bavelse estate covers 1,424 hectares (3,520 acres) of land (2012), of which approximately half is forest.

== History ==
=== Early history ===
In the Middle Ages, Næsbyholm was an ordinary farm referred to as Næsbygaard.. The first known owner was the knight Anders Olufsen Lunge (died 1408). Næsbygaard was granted status of a manor at some point during the reign of Margrethe I (1353–1412), after Olufsen had acquired more land in the area from the Diocese of Roskilde in exchange of property elsewhere. In 1483-1498, Næsbygaard belonged to Laurens Axelsen Thott. After his death, ownership of the estate seems to have been distributed among his four children. The daughter Anne Lauridsen Thott was married to privy councillor Hans Bille. The two shares that belonged to her sisters, Ingebrog and Margrethe, were confiscated by Christian II because their spouses had supported the Scanian uprising. They were soon thereafter sold to Torben Oxe. He unsuccessfully tried to gain full ownership of the estate. His deceit was disclosed but he was never punished.

=== 1513–1651: Rosenkrantz and Brahe families ===
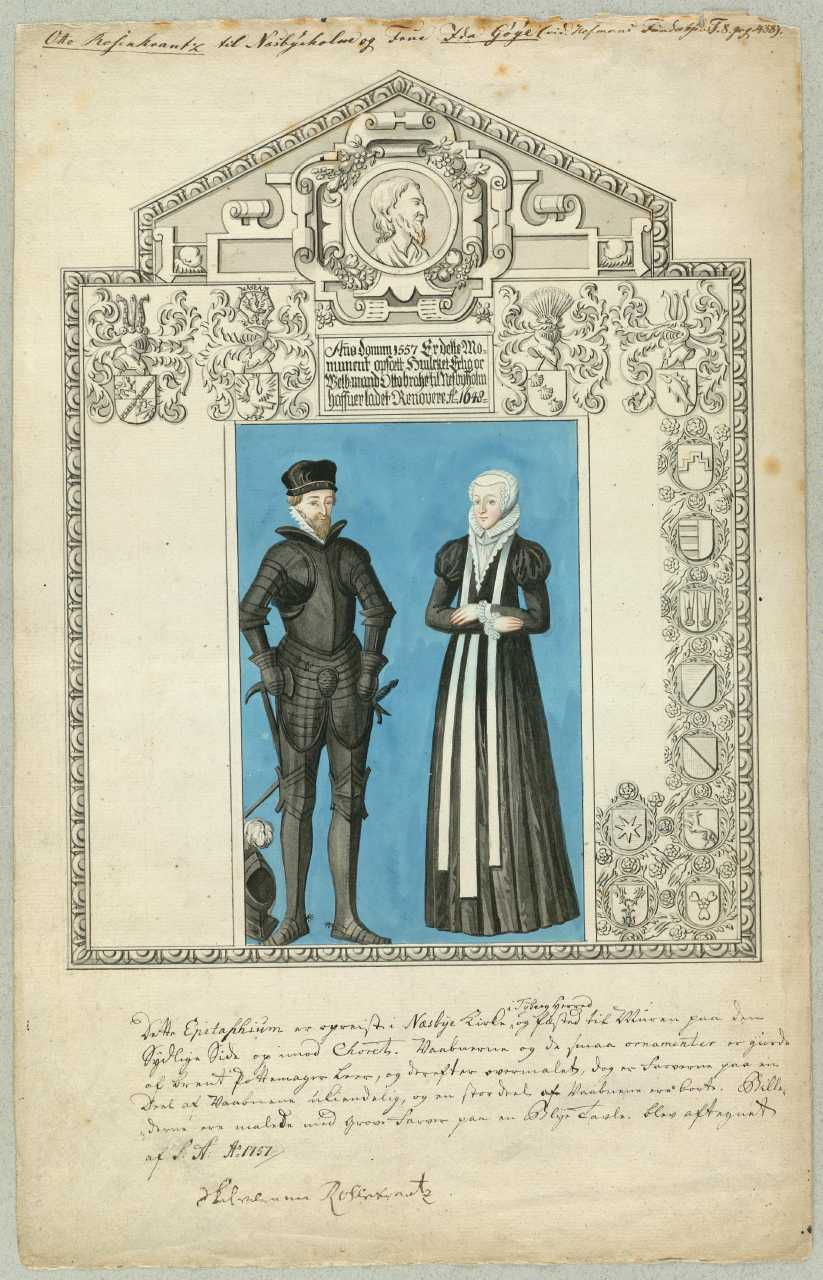
Epitaph to Otto Rosenkrantz and Ida Gøye in Næsby Church, drawing by Søren Abildgaard from 1757

In 1513, Næsbyholm was instead acquired by Otte Holgersen Rosenkrantz. On his death in 1525, Næsbyholm passed to his son Otto Ottesen Rosenkranz. During the Count's Feud, in 1534–1536, Næsbyholm was plundered by the townspeople of Skælskør and may have been left uninhabited for a while.

When Otte Ottesen Rosenkrantz died from plague in Lübeck in 1557, Næsbyholm passed to his daughter Birgitte Ottesdatter Rosenkrantz.

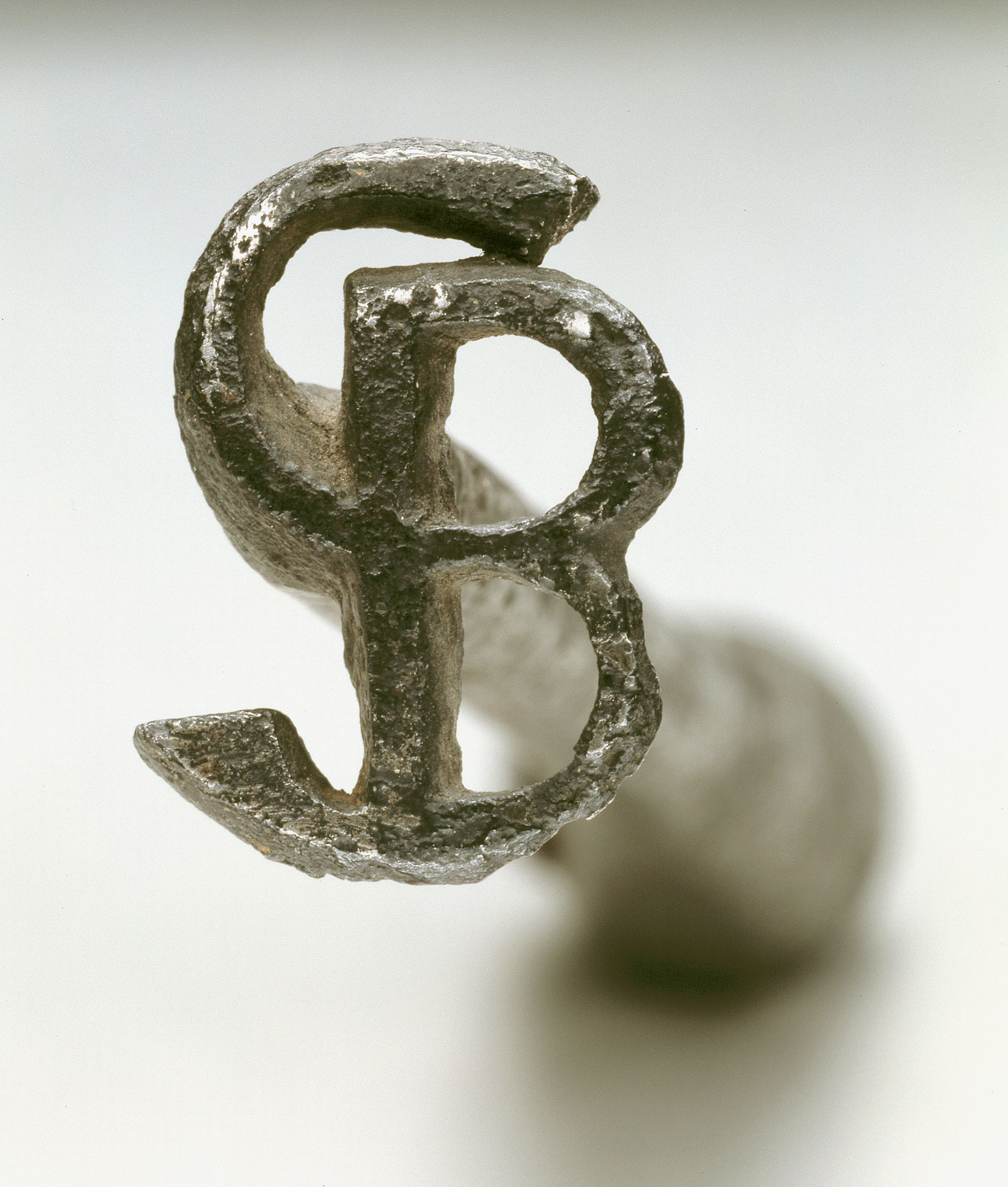
A branding iron with Steen Brahe's initials used for the branding of cattle, found on the Næsbyholm estate.

In 1575, she married Steen Ottesen Brahe, a diplomat and advisor both to Frederik II and Christian IV. In 1581, Brahe also purchased Bregentved. Brahe had been rewarded with a number of royal fiefs. Steen Brahe constructed a new main building in 1585 and also increased the size of the estate through the acquisition of more land. However, Birgitte Rosenkrantz Brahe died in labour shortly after the new main building had been completed and her husband then moved away from the estate but nonetheless kept it until his death. Brahe's second wife brought Barritskov and Bradskov in Jutland into the marriage. He also inherited Tersløsegaard on Zealand, Hvedholm on Funen and Engelsholm in Jutland.

Steen Brahe's many estates were after his death divided between his heirs. Næsbyholm and Tersløsegård went to his son Otte Steensen Brahe. His eldest brother Jørgen Steensen Brahe was given Hvedholm, Erik Steensen Brahe received Bregentved (but instantly sold it), and the daughter Birgitte Steensdatter Brahe received Barritskov og Basnæs. Otte Steensen Brahe increased the size of the Næsbyholm estate even further. He died on the estate in 1761. Neither of his two daughters survived him and his estates were therefore passed to his only grandson, Otto Christopher Ulfeldt, but he died at just 17 years old a few years later.

=== 1663–1709: Bielke family ===
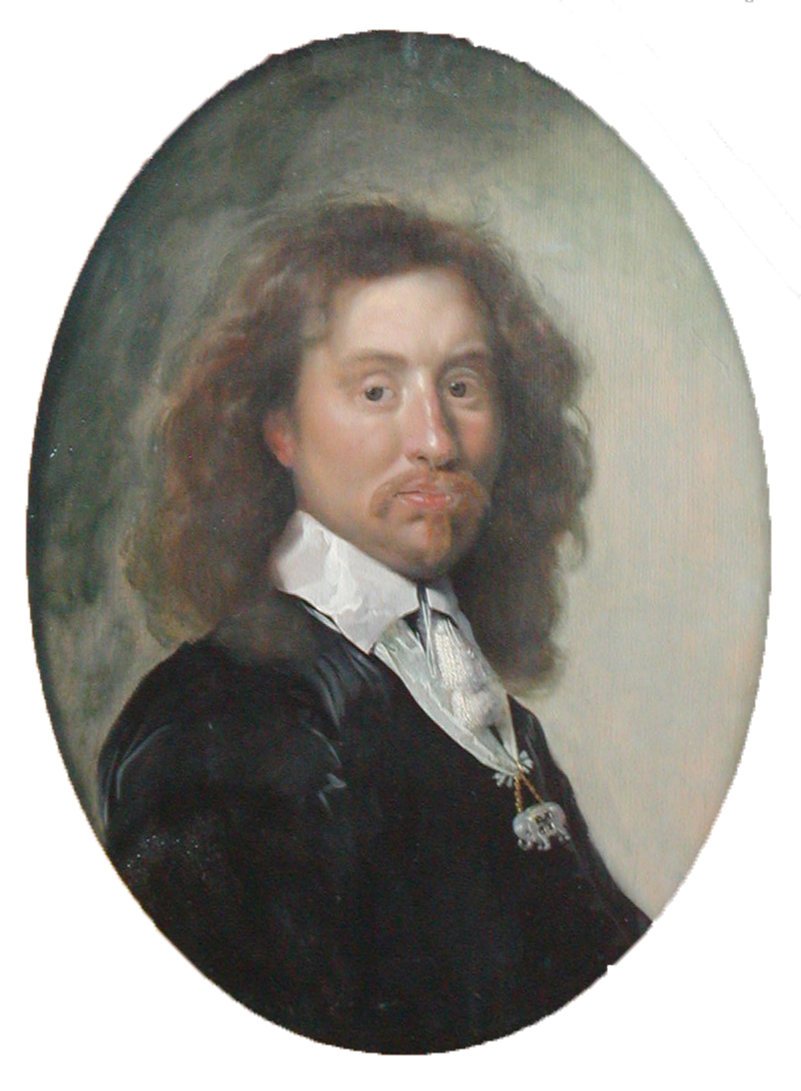
Portrait of Henrik Bjelke by Karel van Mander III

In 1763, Næsbyholm, Bavelse and Tarsløsegaard were all purchased by Admiral of the Realm Henrik Bielke. Also in 1663, Frederick III granted a property north of Copenhagen to Bjelke and it was later named Edelgave after his wife Edel Ulfeldt.

Bilke retired from the Navy in 1679. He died in 1683 and was buried in Næsby Church. Næsbyholm passed to his eldest son, Christian Frederik Bielke, who was then only 13 years old. He joined the army a few years later, was promoted through the ranks, and ended up spending much of his time in foreign service abroad. He was severely wounded on 11 September 1708 during the Conquest of Tournai and died from his injuries three days later.

=== 1709-1720: A royal affair ===
In 1709 and 1710, Næsbyholm and nearby Bavelse were acquired by Frederik IV for his mistress, Charlotte Helene von Schindel, who was given the title Countess of Frederiksholm. The relationship ended in 1711; Frederick entered into his relationship with Anne Sophie Reventlow and ordered Charlotte Helene von Schindel to leave court for her estate in Själland. She initially stopped at Fyn and claimed to be pregnant with Frederick's child, but the pregnancy turned out to be false. Charlotte Helene von Schindel hosted a vivid social life at her estate and entered into a relationship with Ernst Gottschalck Bülow, a German-Danish former military officer and current county governor of Antvorskov County, with whom she had a child. The couple tried to conceal the birth, but when the monarch was informed, they were given permission to marry, and did so on 9 February 1716. Næstbyholm and Bavelse reverted to the crown when the countship was dissolved.

=== 1720–1836: Changing owners ===
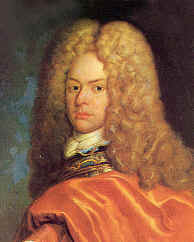
Christian Sigfred von Plessen.

In 1720, Næsbyholm and Bavelse were sold to Peder Thott. He was succeeded on the estate by his son Otto Thott.

Christian Sigfred von Plessen, the younger half-brother of Carl Adolph von Plessen and Christian Ludvig von Plessen, purchased Næsbyholm and Bevelse from Otto Thott's daughters in 1723.

In 1645, Næsbyholm and Bavelse were acquired by Johan Ludvig Holstein and incorporated in the countship of Ledreborg.

In 1775, Johan Ludvig Holstein sold Næsbyholm and Bavelse to Carl Adolph Raben. His son, Frederik Sophus Raben, sold the estates in 1804.

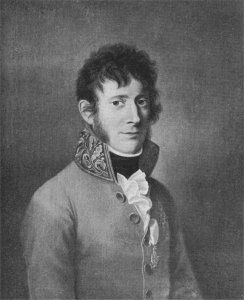
Christian Conrad, Count of Danneskiold-Samsøe

The new owner, Christian Conrad, Count of Danneskiold-Samsøe, was a very industrious landowner. He also purchased the estates Holmegaard, Ravnstrup, Nordfeld, Aalebæksgaard and Rosendal. He embraced new legislation for rural affairs and went further than the law required. He encouraged forestry and horticulture on his domains. To facilitate transportation of timber from his forest at Næsbyholm, he canalized the Suså River from Bavelse to Næstved. This "Danneskiold Canal" was inaugurated on 11 September 1812. Danneskiold-Samsøe was, however, hit hard by the agricultural crisis that followed the war with England and the national bankruptcy of 1913. The government took over his estates one year after his death.

=== 1836–present: Rønnenkamp family ===
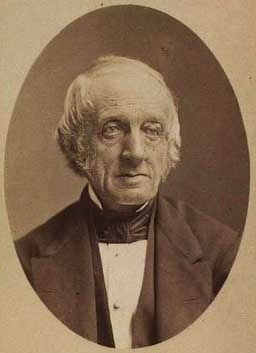
Christian Rønnenkamp

In 1836, Næsbyholm was sold to Christian Rønnenkamp. He was the son of a merchant from Flensburg but had moved to Copenhagen in an early age where he had made a fortune on speculative investments during the war years. He now settled on his estates and managed them himself.

Rønnenkamp had no children and therefore left his estates to his wife's grandson, P. Christian Howden (1854–1930), who assumed the last name Howden-Rønnenkamp. He constructed new farm buildings and redesigned the garden. The eldest of his four daughters Jessy (1887–1954) married Mogens Holck (1885–) in 1910. They would later use Næsbyholm as a summer residence alongside Holckenhavn. The manor was again hit by fire in 1732 and again in 1947 but both times reconstructed in its original style. In 1948, Hessy Holck ceded Næsbyholm to her son Mogens Preben Christian Eiler Holck. He owned it until 1975.

== Architecture ==
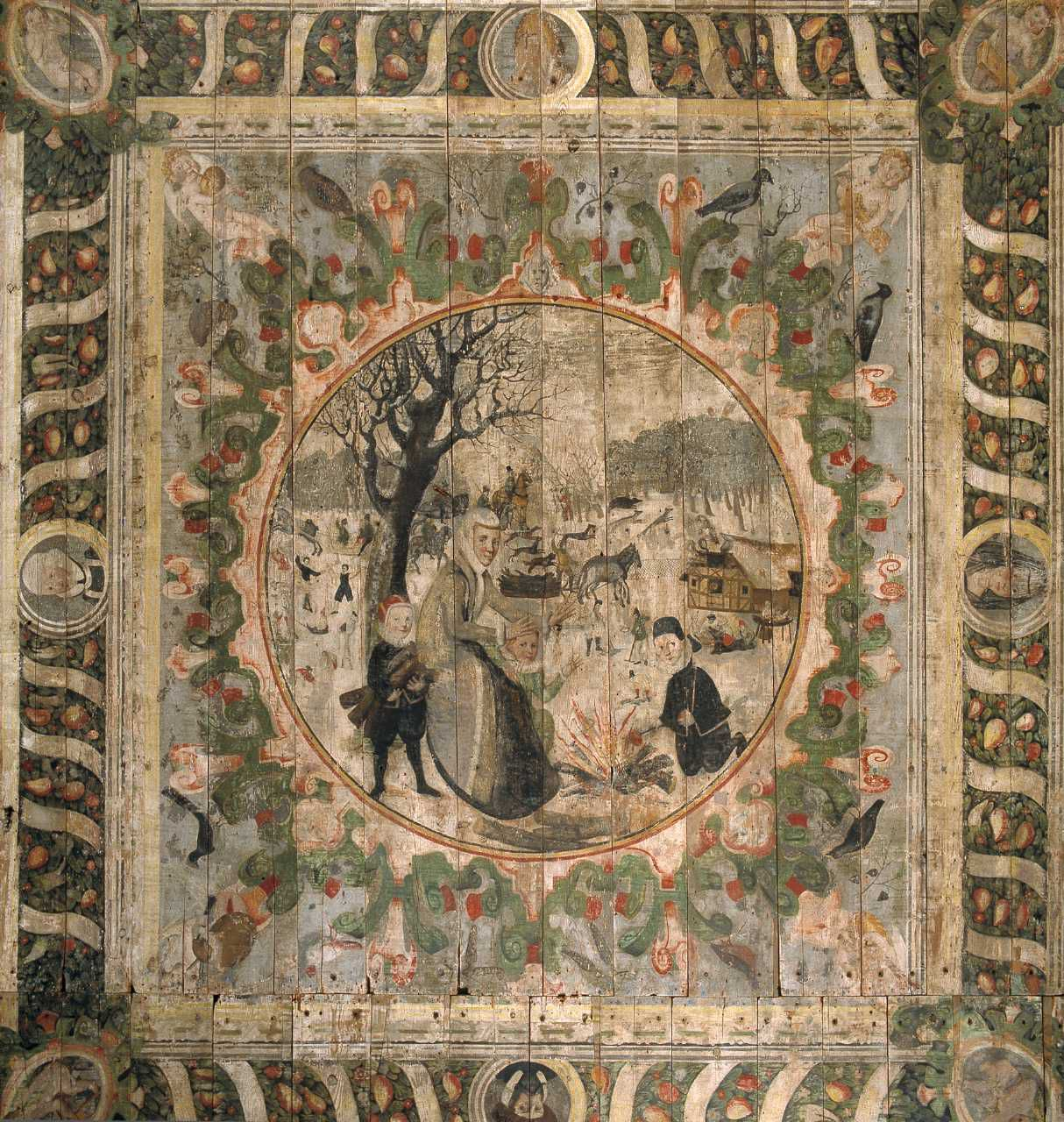
The Næsbyholm Ceiling: Winter

The manor house is known for the Næsbyholm Ceiling, originally decorated with four allegorical frescos of the four seasons, of which only "Winter" and "Spring" have survived.

== Today ==
Næsbyholm is today owned by Mogens Holck, who resides at Bavelse. Næsbyholm is managed as an event venue by Morten and Christel Lund. The largest room seats 120 people at long tables and 100 people at round tables. It has 29 double rooms and one single room.

== Cultural references ==
Næsbyholm was used as a location in the 2014–2015 television series Heartless.

== List of owners ==
- ( – ) Anders Olufsen Lunge
- ( –1442) Unknown
- (1442– ) Jep Andersen Lunge
- ( – ) Elitze Jensdatter Lunge née Finkenov
- ( –1482) Laurens Axelsen Thott
- (1482– ) Karen Eriksdatter Thott née Niepertz
- ( –1505) Hans Bille
- (1505–1509) Axel Laurensen Thott
- (1505–1509) Margrethe Laurensen Thott
- (1505–1509) Ingeborg Laurensen Thott
- (1509) The Crown
- (1509–1513) Torben Oxe
- (1509–1525) Otte Holgersen Rosenkrantz
- (1525–1557) Otte Ottesen Rosenkrantz
- (1557–1575) Birgitte Ottesdatter Brahe née Rosenkrantz
- (1575–1620) Steen Ottesen Brahe
- (1620–1651) Otte Steensen Brahe
- (1651–1663) Otto Christopher Ulfeldt
- (1663–1683) Henrik Bielke
- (1683–1709) Christian Frederik Bielke
- (1709–1710) The Crown
- (1710–1716) Charlotte Helene von Schindel
- (1716–1720) The Crown
- (1720–1723) Peder Thott
- (1720–1723) Otto Thott
- (1720–1723) Dorothea Thott
- (1720–1723) Anna Thott
- (1723–1756) Christian Sigfred von Plessen
- (1756–1763) Johan Ludvig Holstein
- (1763–1775) Christian Frederik Holstein
- (1775– ) Carl Adolph Raben
- ( –1804) Frederik Sophus Raben
- (1804–1823) Christian Conrad, Count of Danneskiold-Samsøe
- (1823–1824) Estate of Christian Conrad Sophus Danneskjold-Samsøe
- (1824–1837) Danish government
- (1837–1867) Christian Rønnenkamp
- (1867–1872) Jessy Caroline Rønnenkamp née Howden
- (1872–1881) Estate of Jessy Caroline Rønnenkamp née Howden
- (1881–1930) Peter Christian Howden-Rønnenkamp
- (1930–1948) Jessy Holck née Howden-Rønnenkamp
- (1948–1975) Mogens Preben Christian-Eiler Howden-Rønnenkamp Holck
- (1975– ) Karl Mogens Howden-Rønnenkamp Holck
