= Mads Eriksen =

Mads Eriksen may refer to:

- Mads Eriksen (cartoonist)
- Mads Eriksen (musician)

== See also ==
- Mads Eriksen Bølle , Danish privy councillor, landowner and fiefholder
