= Amaliegade 15–17 =

Townhouses in Copenhagen, Denmark

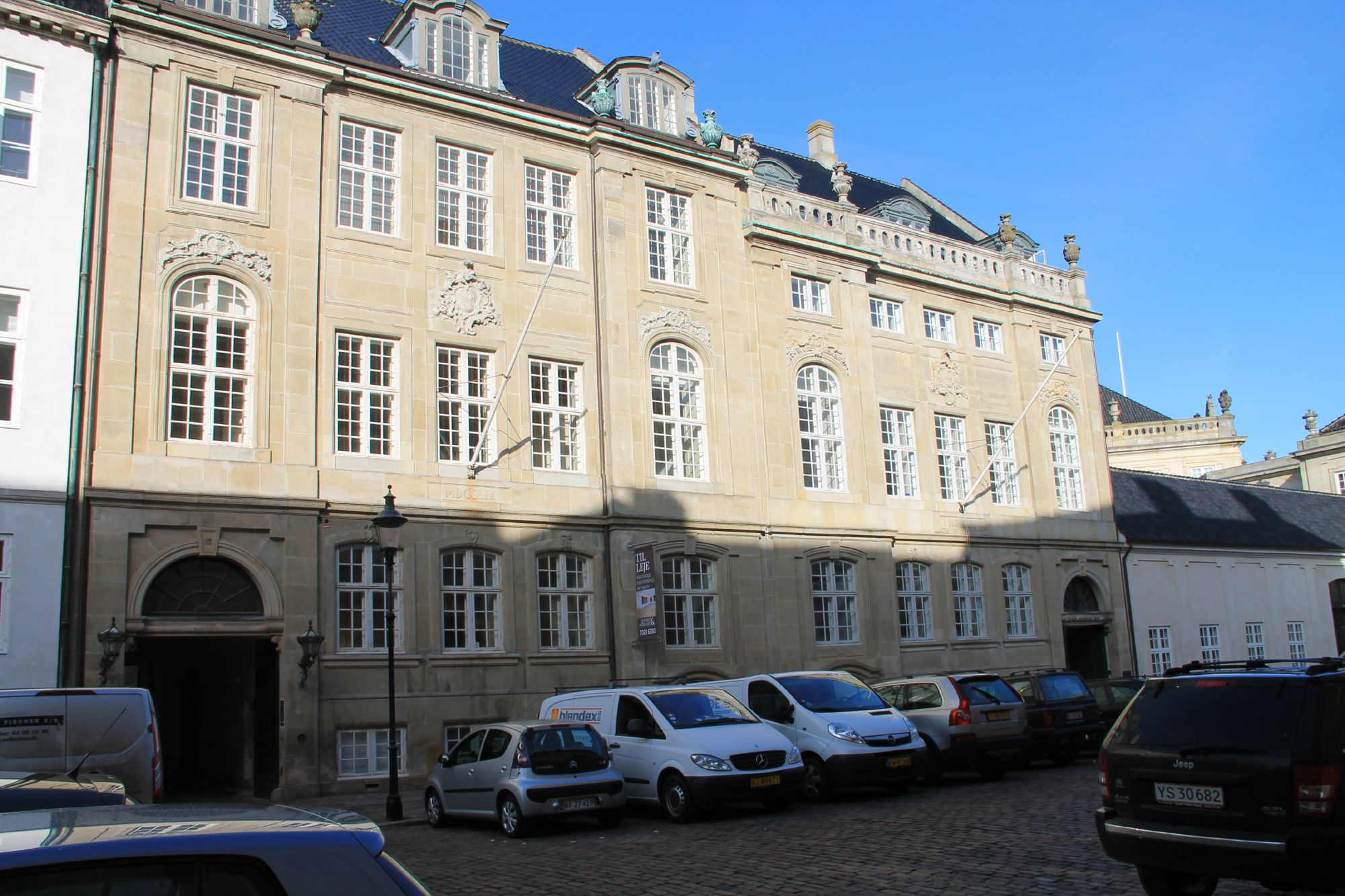
- Interactive map of the Amaliegade 15–17 area

General information
- Location: Copenhagen, Denmark
- Coordinates: 55°40′59″N 12°35′31.84″E
- Completed: 1756
- Renovated: 1891

Amaliegade 15–17 are two originally symmetrical, Rococo-style townhouses located close to Amalienborg Palace on Amaliegade in the Frederiksstaden district of central Copenhagen, Denmark. The exterior of the buildings was designed by the architect Nicolai Eigtved who had also created the overall masterplan for the neighbourhood. The house at No. 15 was heightened with a half floor in 1891.

== History ==
=== Bæsecke and Pfeiffer ===
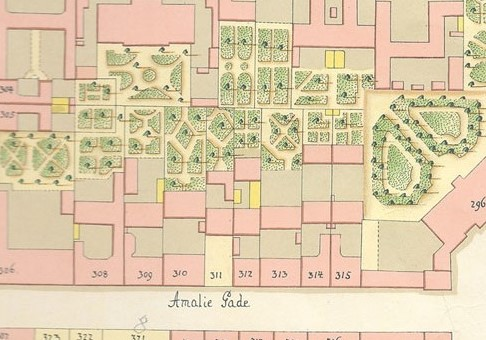
No. 314 and No. 315 seen on a detail from Christian Gedde's map of St. Ann's Rast Quarter, 1757.

The two buildings were built in 1754-1756 for the two master stone carvers Georg Vilhelm Bæseke (No. 15) and Johan Peter Pfeiffer (1718–1771, No. 17). The buildings were built by G. D. Anthon (1714–1781) according to an exterior design created by Nicolai Eigtved. The stonework was executed by the owners.

In the bwq cadastre of 1756, the two properties were listed as No. 71 Z and No. 71 Æ. On Christian Gedde's map of St Ann's East Quarter, they were marked as No. 314 and No. 315.

=== 1787 census ===
At the time of the 1787 census, No. 61 Z was home to three households. Christian Lytken, a Royal Danish Navy captain, resided in one of the apartments with his wife Charlotte Birgitte Clausen, their eight children (aged two to 12), a male servant, a maid, a female cook, a nanny and a lodger (a sailor). Christian Brandt, a kancelliråd, resided in the other apartment with his wife Charlotte Schiel, three maids, a female cook, two male servants, a clerk, a coachman, a stableman and a caretaker. Søren Christensen, an innkeeper, resided in the building with his wife Christiane Sørens Datter, their two children aged one and three) and a female cook.

At the time of the 1787 census, No. 61 Æ was home to two households. Adam Ferdinand Molke, a counter admiral. resided in one of the apartments with his wife Catharina Sophia Wilhelmina Wedell, a housekeeper, a maid, a female cook, a male servant and a stableman. August Tideman, a concierge, resided in the building with his wife Anne Peders Datter and a female cook.

=== The Moltke family ===
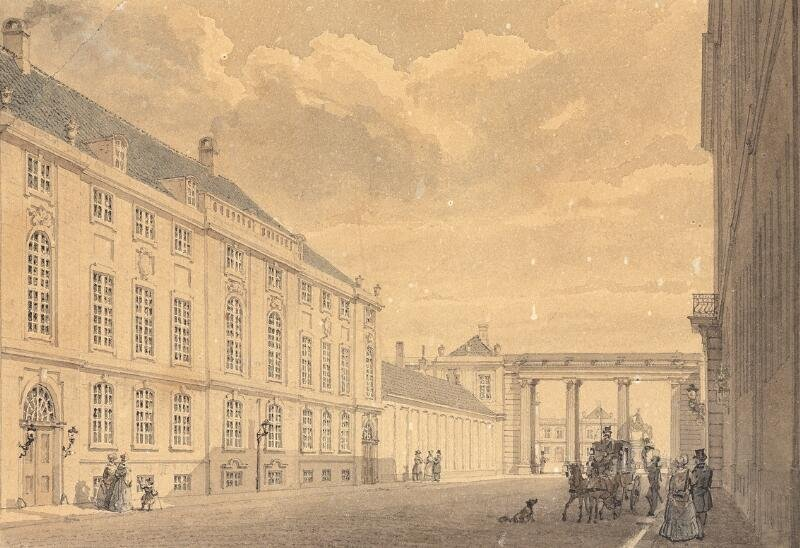
The building seen on a water colour by H.F.D. Holm from c. 1850.

Count Adam Gottlob Moltke, the king's lord chamberlain, acquired No. 15 in 1761. His son, Joachim Godske Moltke, lived in the building in 1770–1784. Frederik Moltke (1754–1836) lived at No. 17 in the years around 1798 while Adam Wilhelm Moltke lived at No. 17 in 1807, then at No. 15 from 1808 to 1830 and then again at No. 17 in 1831–1839. Carl von Moltke (1798–1866) was registered as a resident at No. 17 in 1856–1858.

=== Later history ===
Gyldendal publisher Jacob Hegel resided at No. 15 in 1910. Count and Countess Raben Lewetzau resided at No. 17. Håndværksrådet was based in the building from at least the mid-1970s. It moved when its new building on Islands Brygge was inaugurated in the 2000s.

== Architect ==
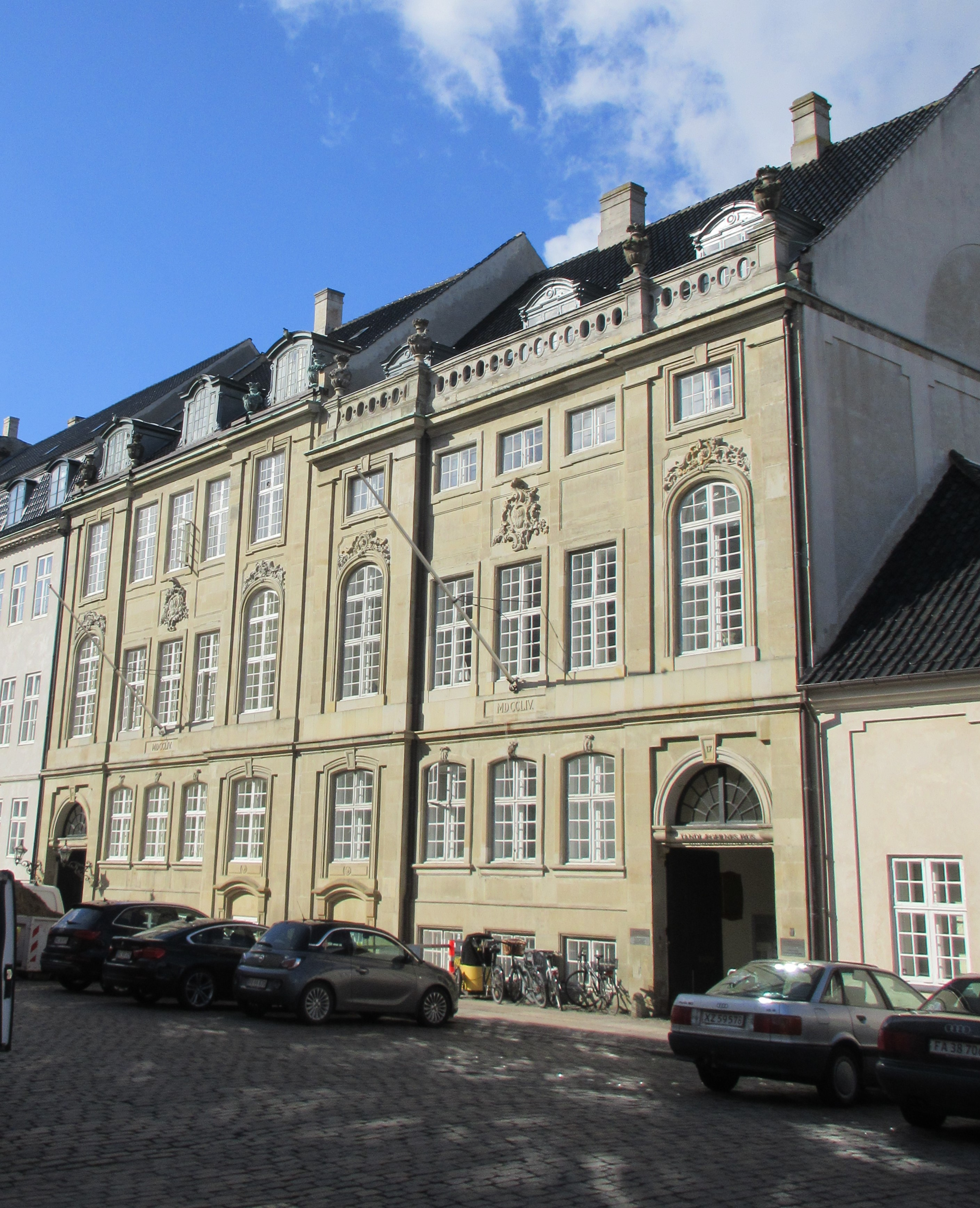
Amaliegade 15-16,

No. 15 was heightened by the architect Gotfred Tvede in 1892.

== Today ==
No. 15 was acquired by Jeudan in 2019. The consulting firm Beyond Advisors is located in the building together with the fashion brand Baum und Pferdgarten, which is based on the first floor of the building.

The Danish Dental Association is based at No. 17 along with a number of other related organisations and foundations.
