= Catherine von Schindel, Duchess of Bernstadt =

Silesian noblewoman, landowner and heiress

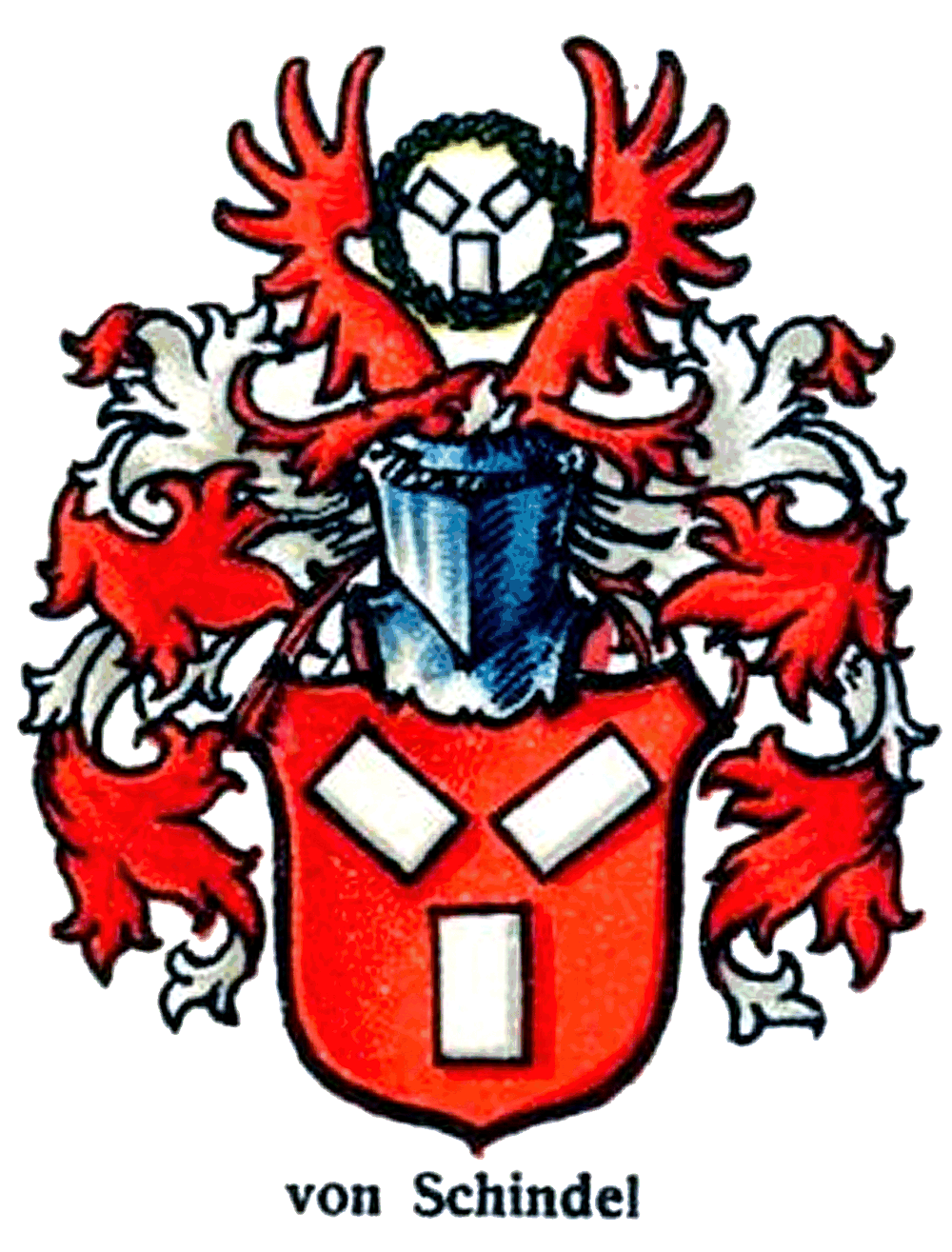
Coat of arms of the House of Schindel

Catherine Elizabeth von Schindel zu Sasterhausen, Duchess of Bernstadt, known also by her later married names as Catherine von Dyhrn und Schönau and Catherine von Köckritz und Friedland (1559 - 16 May 1601) was a Silesian noblewoman, landowner and heiress.

After her father had bought the Duchy of Bernstadt from Henry III, Duke of Münsterberg-Oels in 1574 the von Schindel family gained a big influence in the Silesian aristocracy in the last decades of the 16th century and made a significant social rise. The von Schindels had the right to use the title of a Duke exclusively in connection with their property and as long as they were owners of the Duchy of Bernstadt, which covers the period of 30 years (1574-1604).

== Family ==
Her parents were Heinrich von Schindel zu Sasterhausen, since 1574 the Duke of Bernstadt, and his wife Elizabeth von Nimptsch. Catherine had one more sister named Barbara von Schindel zu Sasterhausen, who married into the von Kanitz and von Muhlheim families and died in 1622. Her ancestors were members of the families Zedlitz-Nimmersatt, Schweinichen, Nimptsch, and Stosch.

Her distant relative was Charlotte Helene von Schindel, the royal-mistress of the King Frederick IV of Denmark.

== Marriage and children ==
Catherine von Schindel was at her time considered to be a very wealthy heiress. As the oldest daughter of her parents she inherited the Duchy of Bernstadt, including the seat of the Duchy which was the Bernstadt Palace, where Catherine and her family resided since 1574 till 1604. Besides Bernstadt she owned the properties Sasterhausen and Steffansdorf. She was considered to be a good catch from early on and had therefore had many Silesian aristocrats courting her. She married three of them.

In 1575 she married for the 1st time, at the age of 16, Ernst von Gellhorn (see «References») from the Peterswaldau estate, the son of George von Gellhorn and Catherine von Reichenbach. Catherine's grand nephew from this marriage was the Count Ernst von Gellhorn (1617-1679), who was known as the richest and very powerful man in Silesia at the time and who even succeeded to marry a Princess from the House of Schleswig-Holstein-Sonderburg, a 1st cousin of Eleonora Princess of Liechtenstein (1655-1702). Catherine's husband died at an early age after one year of marriage in which no children were born.

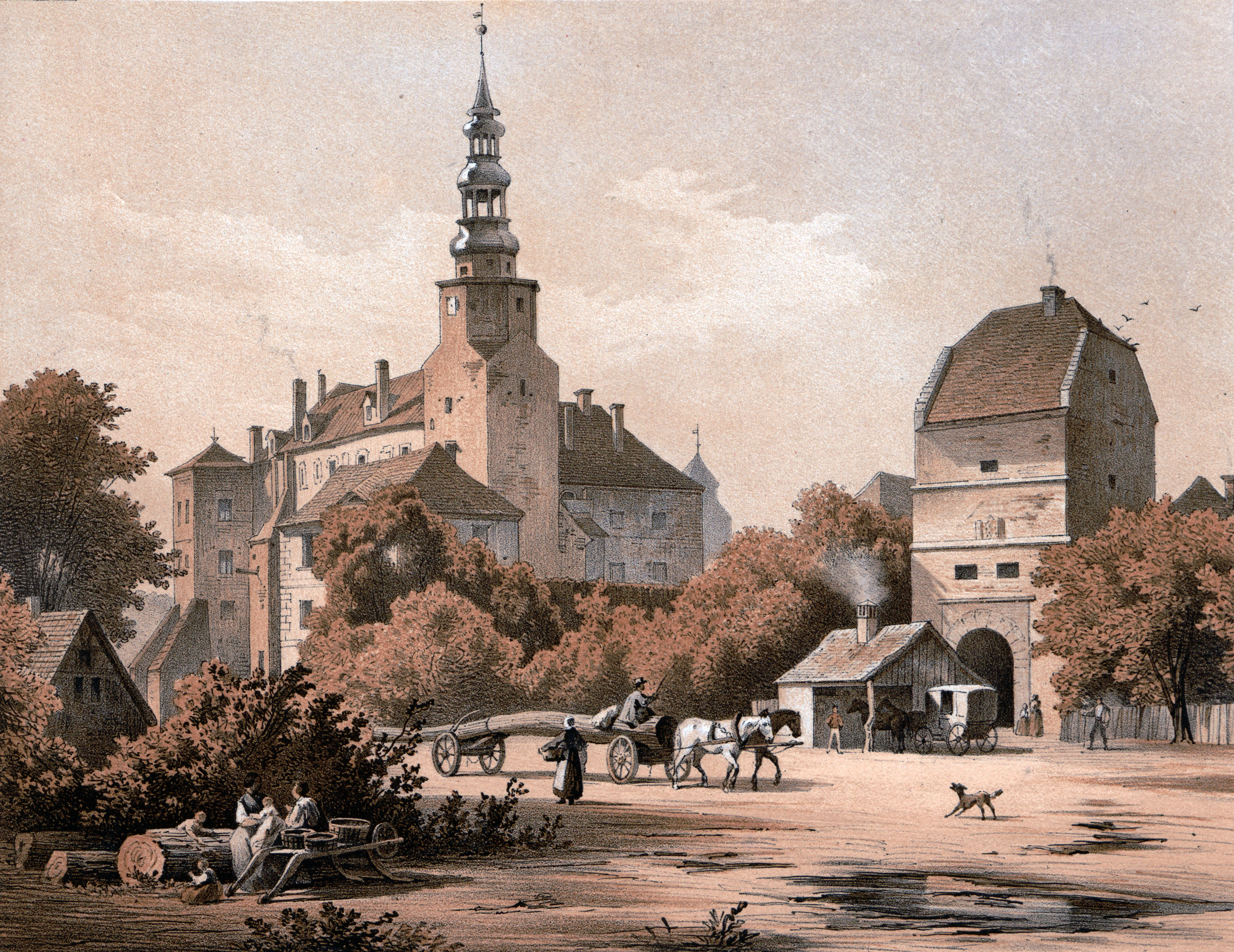
Catherine's residence in Bernstadt

In 1578 Catherine married for the 2nd time George II von Dyhrn und Schönau, owner of the city of Festenberg and of the properties Ulbersdorf, Gimmel, Reesewitz etc., the son of Nicholas III von Dyhrn und Schönau and his 1st wife Lucia von Blanckenstein. George von Dyhrn was the head of the government of the Duchy of Oels and the right hand of Henry III, Duke of Münsterberg-Oels and of his brother Charles II, Duke of Münsterberg-Oels. With him she had three children:

- Anna Elisabeth von Dyhrn und Schönau, married to George III von Wiedebach
- Hans Georg I von Dyhrn und Schönau, a Silesian chamberlain, diplomat and a secondary Oberhofmeister at the Habsburg-court in Vienna, married to Baroness Elizabeth von Nimptsch-Röversdorf
- Catharina von Dyhrn und Schönau, married to Caspar von Posadowsky-Postelwitz

The family resided at the Bernstadt Palace until 1596. In the meantime (in 1587) Catherine's 2nd husband died. She was the main heir of the property of Festenberg and brought it as a dowry into her third marriage.

In 1596 she married for the 3rd time her brother-in-law's cousin Caspar von Köckritz und Friedland, the son of Sigismund von Köckritz und Friedland and Anne von Kanitz. He was the owner of the properties Linsen and Neudorf. They had one son:

- Sigismund von Köckritz und Friedland (1601-1664), married to Baroness Maria Saurma von und zu der Jeltsch. He inherited Festenberg from his mother Catherine and passed it on to his son Sigismund Jr., who sold it in 1676 to the Duchess Eleonore Charlotte of Württemberg-Montbéliard, the granddaughter of the protestant French general Gaspard III de Coligny.

== The loss of the Duchy of Bernstadt ==
In 1572 Catherine's mother died and four years later her father Heinrich von Schindel unexpectedly died as well. According to his last will, published after his death, his successor should be his oldest male descendant, but as he had no sons from his marriage his whole wealth was inherited by his oldest daughter Catherine, who was at the time a minor (17 years old). Catherine's cousin, Jonas von Schindel, who was interested in inheriting the Duchy, filed a lawsuit against Catherine for not respecting her father's last will. His attempts to become the owner of Bernstadt caused the von Schindel family to split in two parts. After 20 years of lawsuits he was granted the right to take over the Duchy as he was then the oldest male member of the von Schindel family, who could also provide with a successor -he had a son named Leonhard von Schindel and a daughter Ursula, who married the Baron Nicholas II. von Burghauß. It was in 1596 when Catherine von Schindel lost her residence, the Bernstadt Palace, and the Duchy, over which she had an almost absolute power for two decades. The two parts of the family never reconciled. Catherine von Schindel moved with her third husband to her estate in Festenberg, where she lived till her death in 1601. She is buried inside of the church in Festenberg as well as are all of her three husbands. In April 1603, two years after her death, her third husband Caspar von Köckritz und Friedland went to hunt deer in Goschütz. One of his friends, Hans von Borschnitz, accidentally shot him with a gun and Köckritz died. In the same year Jonas von Schindel died as well, leaving the Duchy of Bernstadt to his son Leonhard, who sold it already in 1604 back to the House of Podiebrad.
