= Christian Frederik Bielke =

Danish military officer (1670–1709)

Christian Frederik Bielke (8 May 1670 – 14 September 1709) was a Danish military officer. He was the son of Admiral Henrik Bielke. He was from 1683 to 1709 the owner of Næsbyholm at Glumsø.

== Early life ==
Bielke was born on 8 May 1670, the son of Admiral Henrik Bielke (1615–1683) and Edel Christoffersdatter Ulfeldt (1630–1676).

== Career ==
In 1688, Bielke was a fændrik in the Royal Life Guards. In 1690, he was a second lieutenant in a Guards Battalion in English service in Ireland. Later that same year he was promoted to first lieutenant and in 1691 to captain. In 1693–94, he served with the Royal danois and was wounded in the Battle of Neerwinden. In September he and Christian Gyldenløve returned to Denmark, where he was promoted to major and put in charge of a battalion in Oldenburg.

In 1695, he served as a volunteer in the allied force in the Siege of Namur. He was in 1697 promoted to lieutenant-colonel and in 1701 to colonel and chief of the new Funen Infantry Regiment. In 1706, he was appointed chief of Prince Christian's Regiment. In 1708 he went abroad again when he was put in charge of a Prince Carl's Regiment battalion in English-Dutch service in Brabant. He was at the same time appointed Brigadier of the auxiliary troops. In June 1709, he participated in the Conquest of Tournai and was on 11 September that same year wounded so severely in the Battle of Malplaquet that he died three days later.

== Property ==
Bielke inherited Næsbyholm from his father but sold it in 1709 to Frederick IV.

== Personal life ==
Bielke was on 23 June 1697 married to Anna Christine von Knuth (c. 1678–1723), a daughter of county governor Eggert Christopher von Knuth (1643–1697) and Søster Lerche (1658–1723). She was later married for a second time in 1714 to gehejmeråd, and overhofmester Frederik Walter (1649–1718).
