= Christian Rønnenkamp =

Danish businessman

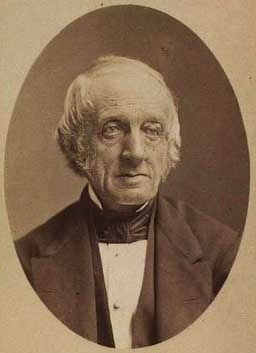
- Rønnenkamp photographed in the mid-1860s
- Born: 20 December 1785; Flensburg, Duchy of Schleswig
- Died: 28 December 1867 (aged 82); Næsbyholm, Denmark
- Occupations: Merchant, sugar manufacturer and landowner

Christian Rønnenkamp (20 December 1785 – 27 December 1867) was a Danish businessman, landowner and philanthropist. He constructed the listed property at Amaliegade 4 in Copenhagen and owned the estates of Næsbyholm and Bavelse from 1835.

== Early life and education ==
Rønnenkamp was born in Flensburg in Schleswig-Holstein. He was the son of merchant and hospital superintendent Nicolaj Christian Rønnenkamp (1757–1832) by his first wife Catharina (Tine) Rønnenkamp née Todsen (1763–1787). He was the brother of Hanna Rönnenkamp Müller (1783–1868).

== Career in Copenhagen ==
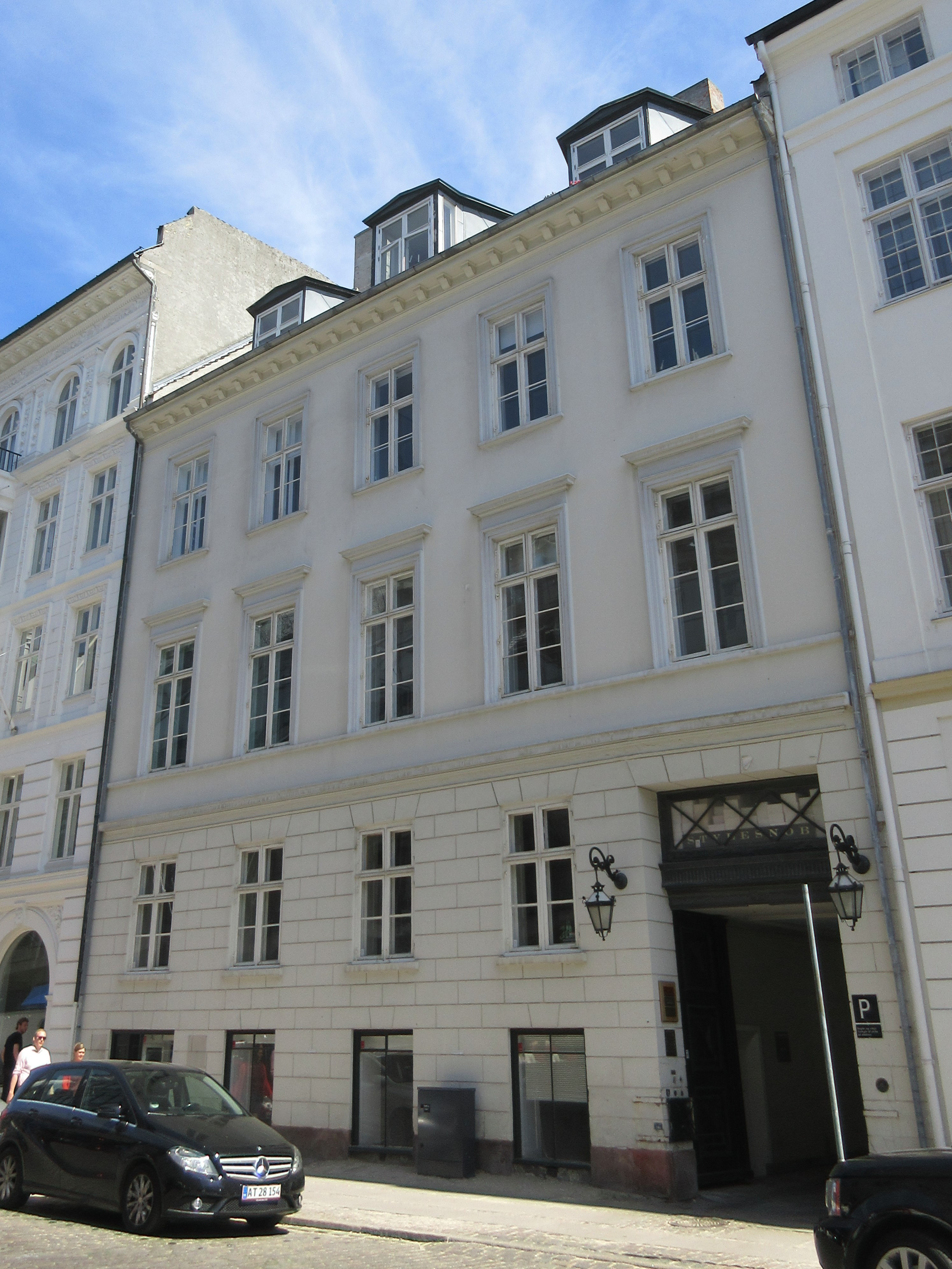
Amaliegade 4

He moved to Copenhagen when he was 15 years old where he first became a merchant's apprentice. Rønnenkamp subsequently established his own grocery business on Store Kongensgade. He later established himself as a wholesaler and expanded his business with a sugar refinery in c. 1819. He moved his business to the corner of Sankt Annæ Plads and Amaliegade after acquiring the former St. Croix House in auction in late 1828. St. Croix Sugar House was likely established by the Baltic Sea Guinea Trading Company (Østersøisk-guineisk Handelsselskab).

Rønnenkamp constructed the building at present-day Amaliegade 4 located in the Frederiksstaden Quarter of central Copenhagen between 1828 and 1829. He sold sugar from the premises and also expanded the activities to comprise refining and sale of salt.

== Næsbyholm and Bavelse ==
Rønnenkamp purchased the estates of Næsbyholm and Bavelse from the Danish government in 1835. From then on he spent most of his time running his estates. He implemented agricultural reforms and refurbished many of the buildings.

== Titles ==
Rønnenkamp was awarded the title Council of State (etatsråd) in 1852 and Chamberlain (kammerherre) in 1858. In 1856, he was made a Knight of the Order of the Dannebrog.

== Family and legacy ==
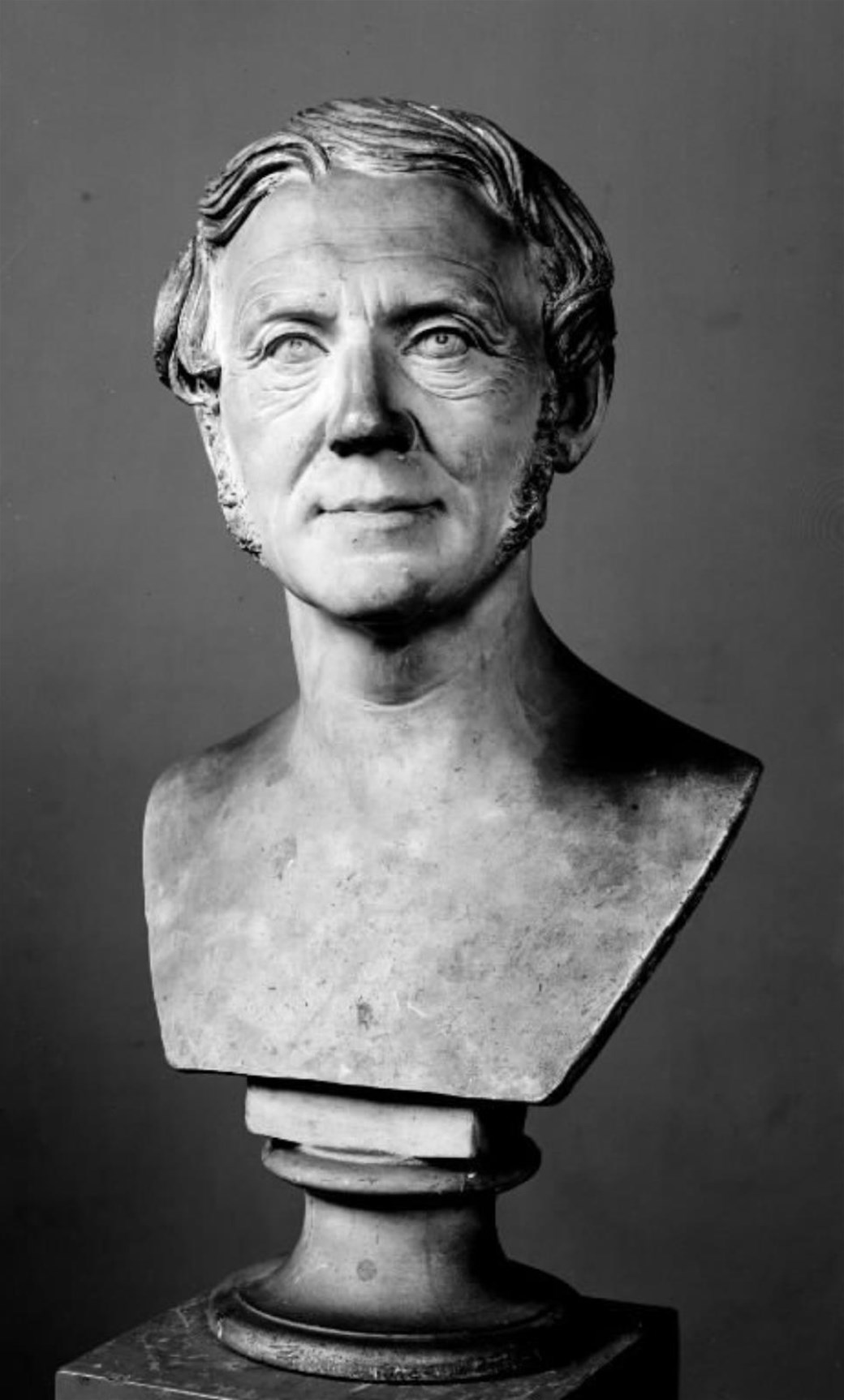
Bust of Rønnenkamp by H. W. Bissen, 1844

On 19 January 1822, Rønnenkamp married Jessy Caroline Howden in Helsingør (1796–1872). The couple had no children. They created a number of charities and grants. These included a home for 16 men and women from their two estates in Næsby (Den Rønnenkampske Stiftelse), a home for old seamen in Flensburg, a grant for purchase of paintings and sculptures and Christiansdal kloster with residences for 24 women. Rønnenkamp's widow left an additional DKK 500,000 to Christiansdal kloster.

Rønnenkamp left the estates at Næstbyholm and Bavelse to his sister Hanna's grandson, Peter Christian Müller (1854–1930), who adopted the surname Howden-Rønnenkamp.
