= Otte Steensen Brahe =

Danish landowner

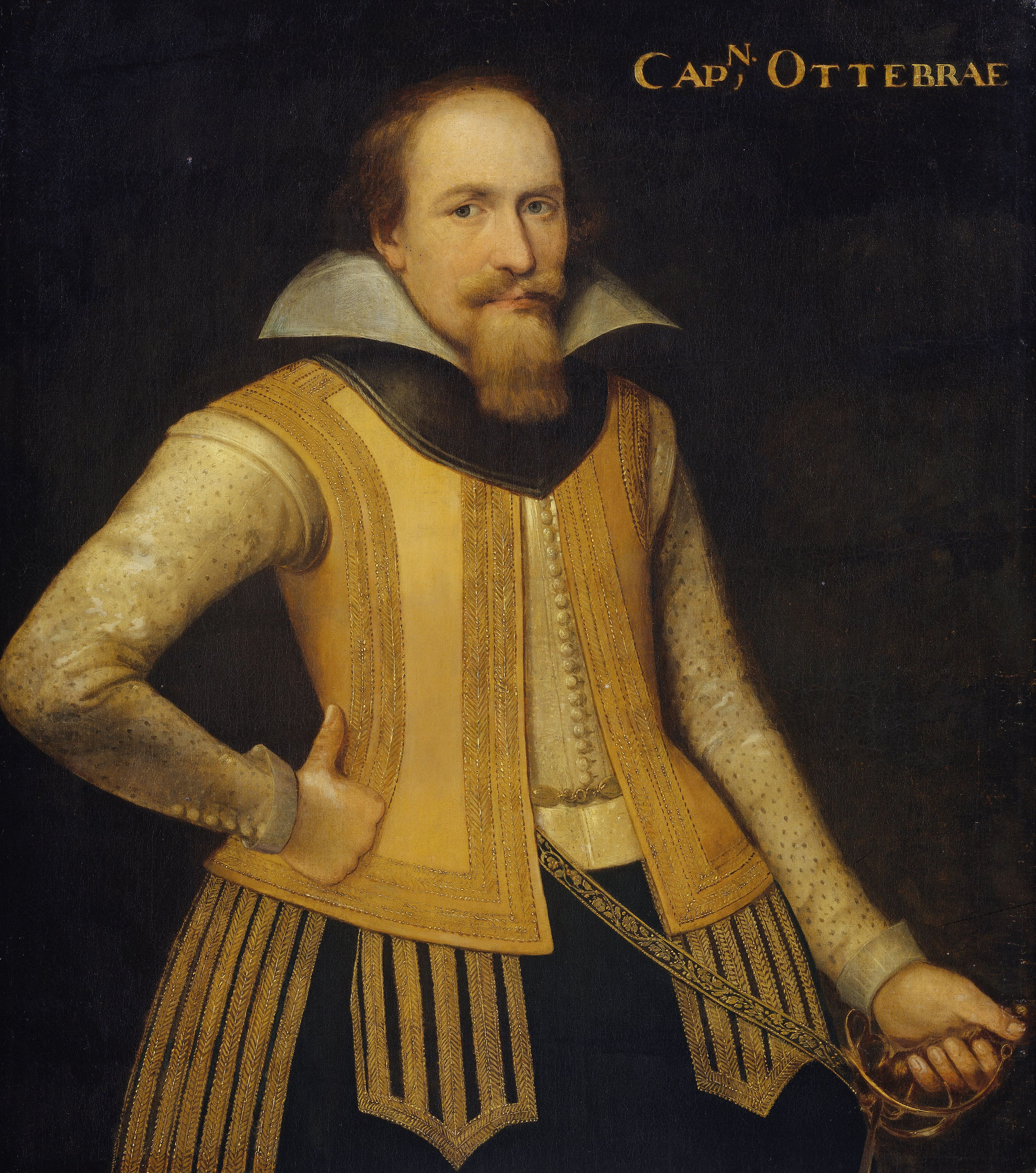
- Brahe painted in circa 1605-10
- Born: 12 April 1578; Næsbyholm, Denmark
- Died: 5 July 1651 (aged 73); Næsbyholm, Denmark
- Occupation: Landowner

Otte Steensen Brahe (12 April 1578 – 5 July 1651), also known as Otto Brahe, was a Danish landowner and money lender. He owned Næsbyholm, Bavelse and Tersløsegaard on Zealand.

== Early life and education ==
Otto Brahe was born on 12 April 1578 at Næsbyholm, the son of privy counsellor Steen Brahe (1547–1620) and Birgitte Rosenkrantz (1555–88). He attended Sorø Academy from 1587 and later continued his education in Aarhus. In 1593–99, Brahe and Kurt Aslaksen went on a grand tour in Europe, studying at the universities in Rostock (1593), Herborn (from spring of 1594), Heidelberg, Basel, Geneve and Orleans (1599). He also visited England and Scotland. In 1600–02, he was a courtier at Frederick V of the Palatinate.

== Military service ==
During the Kalmar War, Brahe served as cornet in the heavy cavalry. He lost an arm in the Battle of Kalmar.

== Property ==
Brahe inherited the estates Næsbyholm and Tersløsegaard after his parents. His holdings were in 1638 valued at 1,639 tænder hartkorn. He increased the size of the Næsbyholm estate significantly through the acquisition of more land. At the time of his death in 1651, it was valued at 930 tønder hartkorn.

Through his third marriage he also acquired Ravnholt on Funen. In 1623, he sold the estate to privy counsellor Holger Rosenkrantz.

From the 1620s, he engaged in large-scale moneylending to his peers and seems even to have speculated in sanctioning obligations. Together with people such as Niels Trolle and Frederik Parsberg, he belonged to a narrow circle of wealthy noblemen who dominated the Danish lending market after the access loans from Holstein and the "king's own coffin" stopped after the Thirty Years' War.

== Publications ==
Brahe published a collection of house and church prayers in 1632.

== Personal life ==
Brahe was married three times. His first wife was Margrethe Krafse (died 1614), a daughter of Hans Krafse (died 1585) and Kirstine Hansdatter Holck (1558–99,). They married circa on 29 September 1603 at Næsbyholm. They had stillborn son in 1614. His second wife was Karen Rud (17 June (, a daughter of Knud Rud (1554 - 1612/1615) and Hilleborg Mogensdatter Gyldenstierne (born c. 1555). They married on 3 June 1618. His third wife was Anne Bild (buried 18 June 1656 in Køge), a daughter of Niels B. (1553–1622) and Margrethe Urne (1547–1620). They married circa on 10 July 1619 i Odense. They had two daughters, Margrethe Ottesdatter Brahe (born after 1619 - 13 September 1648) and Karen Ottesdatter Brahe (22 December 1624 - 1 June 1641). Margrethe Brahe married Bjørn Ulfeldt (20 August 1615 - 9 August 1656) on 31 March 1639 but she died just 28 years old in 1648.

Brahe died on 5 July 1651 and was buried in St. Peter's Church in Næstved. His estates passed to his only grandson, Otto Christopher Ulfeldt, who died just 17 years old in 1663.
