= Edouard Buntzen =

Danish lawyer and politician

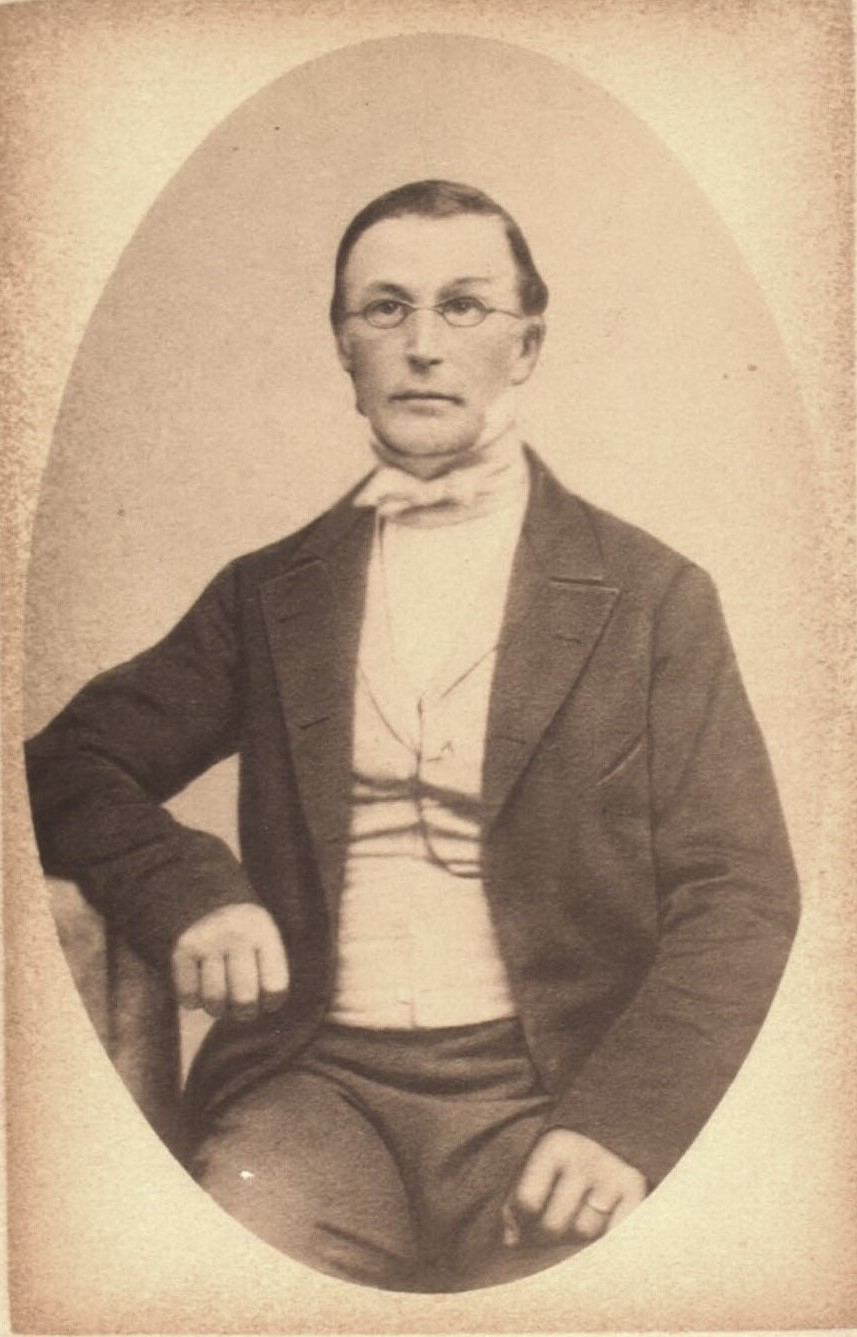
Edouard Buntzen.

Jean Baptiste Louis Camille Edouard Buntzen (9 December 1809 – 2 June 1885) was a Danish lawyer and politician. He was a member of the Danish Constituent Assembly.

== Early life and education ==
Buntzen was born on 9 December 1809 in Copenhagen, the son of businessman Andreas Buntzen and Camilla Cécilie Victoire Du Puy (1790–1871). He was named for his maternal grandfather Édouard Du Puy. He matriculated from Sorø Academy in 1826 and earned a Master of Law degree from the University of Copenhagen in 1832.

== Career ==
In 1738, Buntzen was licensed as a Supreme Court attorney. In 1863, he was appointed as kammeradvokat. On 4 December 1849, he was elected for Folketinget in Copenhagen's 5th Constituency (Blæsenborg).

== Politics ==
On 5 October 1848, Buntzen was elected for the Danish Constituent Assembly in Frederiksborg County's 3rd District (Ramløse).

== Personal life ==
Buntzen married on 12 July 1845 to Anna Sophie Laurentzia Nissen (1820–1874). he was a daughter of Kalundborg-based lawyer Christian Ditlev Høgh Nissen and Helene Birgitte née Grandjean, The couple had five children.

Buntzen owned the property Amaliegade 4 in Copenhagen. He died on 9 June 1885.

== Awards ==
In 1853, Buntzen was awarded the title of justitsråd. In 1869, he was awarded the title of etatsråd. In 1863, he was created a Knight of the Order of the Dannebrog. In 1874, he was awarded the Cross of Honour.
