= N. Schiøtt & Hochbrandt =

N. Schiøtt & Hochbrandt was a shipbroking firm founded in 1792 in Copenhagen, Denmark.

== History ==
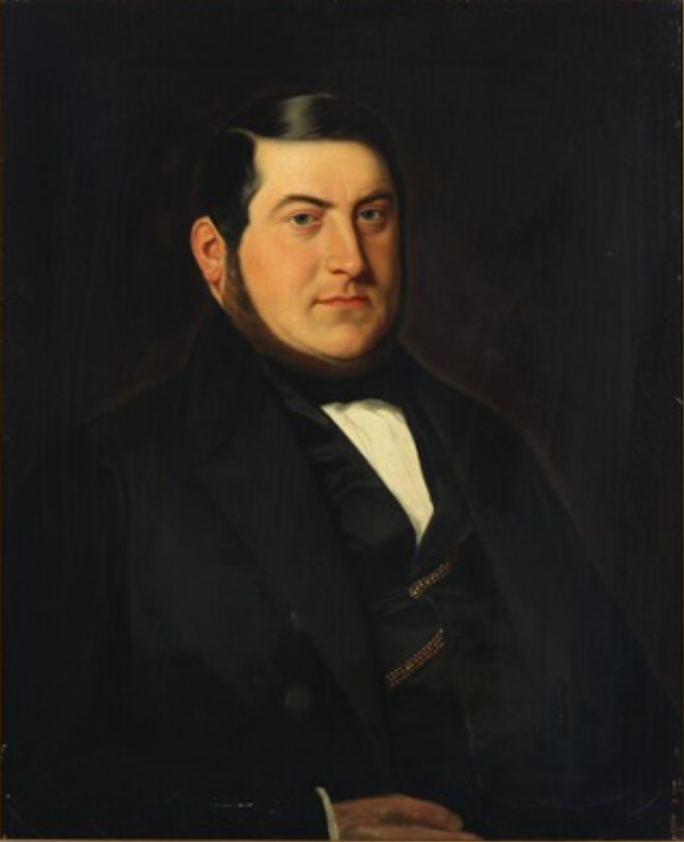
Carl Heinrich Hochbrandt, who was a partner from 1824 to 1865

The company was founded in 1792 by Niels Nielsen Schiøtt (born 12 June 1762) who on 8 October that same year was licensed as broker (stadsmægler). In April 1796, Hans Jørgen Herløw (1763-1837; licensed bestalling 23 March 1796) became a partner in the company. Schiøtt and Herløw advertised under separate names from 1807. Niels Schiøtt continued the operations alone until Carl Wilhelm Hochbrandt (5 May 1785 - 15 March 1859; licensed 26 November 1819) joined him as a partner on 1 January 1820.

C. W. Hochbrandt continued the firm alone after Niels Schiøtt's death in 1824 until his nephew Carl Heinrich (Emmerich) Hochbrandt (2 September 1811,- 1 March 1866; licensed 16 August 1841) became a partner in 1841.

Emil Ferdinand Westrup (21 February 1805 - 8 April 1888), a trusted employee, replaced C. W. Hochbrandt as partner in the firm on 14 March 1857. He had worked for the firm since 1 May 1820 and was licensed as a broker on 9 July 1834. Westrup became the sole owner when C. H. Hochbrandt retired from the firm in 1865. On 1 January 1866, he was an appointed as specialist judge in the Maritime and Commercial Court, an office he held until 1885. Westrup ran the firm until his death in 1888. It was then continued by two employees, Fritz Bernhard Willer (22 April 1830 - 6 December 1913) and Axel Thorvald Valdemar Schmith (10 April 1841 - 18 August 1907). Willer, who had worked in the firm since 1 March 1846, was licensed as a broker on 27 December 1859. Schmith, who had worked for the firm since 3 October 1855, was licensed as a broker on 5 May 1888.

When Schmith died in 1907, he was replaced as partner by Christian Vilh. Møller (11. March 1857 - 22 September 1936), a long-time employee at the office in the Custom House. He had worked for the firm since 1 May 1872 and was licensed as a broker on 29 August 1898

When F. B. Willer died in 1813, he was replaced as partner by Hjalmar Bruhn (born 12 August 1881). He had worked for the firm since 1 August 1900 and was licensed as a broker on 10 March 1914. He became the sole owner of the firm in 1924.

== Location ==
The firm was from 1792 to 1820 based in the founder's property at the corner of Lille Strandstræde and Sankt Annæ Plads. It was from 1820 to 1846 based at Dronningens Tværgade 1-3. It was from 1846 to 1888 based at Dronningens Tværgade 10. It was from 1888 to 1926 based at Amaliegade 39. In 1944, it relocated to temporary premises at Dronningens Tværgade 21. It was from 1945 based at Frederiksgade 19 and from 1 August 1950 at Amaliegade 45.
