= Mads Eriksen Bølle =

Danish privy councillor, landowner and fiefholder

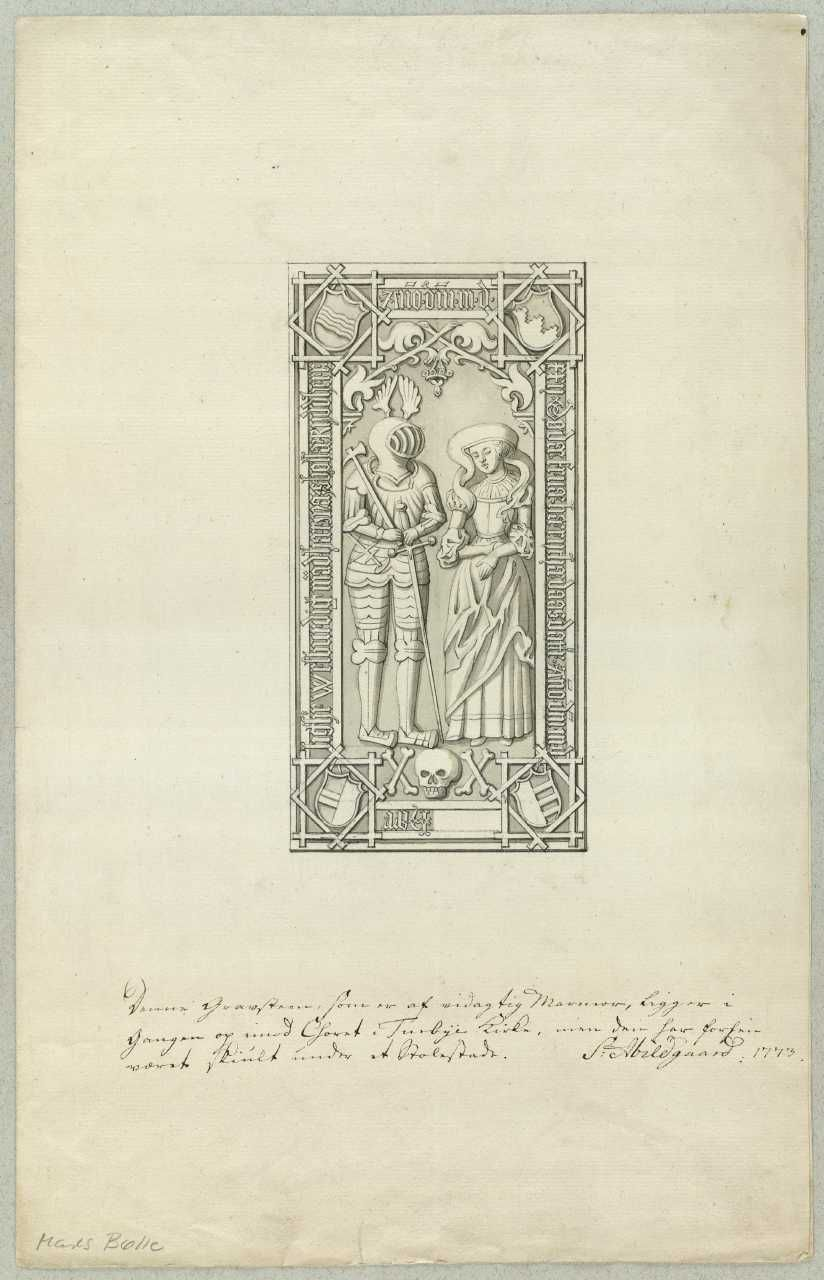
Drawing by Søren Abildgaard of Mads Eriksen Bølle gravestone in Tureby Church

Mads Eriksen Bølle (died 1539) was a Danish privy councillor, landowner and fiefholder. He took part in the Count's Feud in opposition to Christian III and the introduction of Protestantism, but he was nevertheless allowed to retain his fiefs after the Reformation.

== Early life ==
Bølle was the son of Erik Madsen Bølle (died 1492 or later) and Anne Sivertsdatter Blaa. He was the brother of Ejler Eriksen Bølle.

== Holdings ==
He inherited Orebygaard on Lolland and Fuglsang Manor after his mother's death. Prior to her death in 1495, he was Queen Dorothea's lensmand (høvedsmand) at Haraldsborg. In 1500, the Bishopric of Roskilde granted him Hjortholm in North Zealand as a fief. In 1505, Bishop Johan Jepsen Ravensberg, a relative, granted him Tureby, Spanager and Egby for life for himself, his wife and his son Erik. In c. 1507. he was also granted St Agnetes' Priory in Roskilde.

== Career ==
Bølle was a member of the Privy Council from at least 1512, and was knighted by Christian II. In 1523, he participated in Frederick I's siege of Copenhagen. When Christian II attempted to reclaim the thrones in 1531, he was involved in his arrest in Copenhagen as well as in the return of the Church of Our Lady to the Catholic church.

During the Count's Feud, he sided Count Christoffer, but was nonetheless, together with his son, Erik, from January 1535 held in captivity in Copenhagen. In early 1536, they were sent to Mecklenburg. after Copenhagen's surrender, he was handed over to Christian II. He was pardoned by a revers of 27 October the same year. He was allowed to keep his fiefs but lost his seat in the Privy Council. In 1536, Christian III granted him Tersløsegaard-

== Personal life ==
Bølle married Birgitte Clausdatter Daa of Ravnstrup. They had two children, Erik Madsen Bølle, himself a member of the Pricy Council, and a fiefholder, and a daughter, Dorthe, who married Knud Rud of Vedbygård.

Bølle died before 14 November 1539 and is buried in Tureby Church.
