= Charlotte Helene von Schindel =

Danish noble

Charlotte Helene von Schindel (1690–1752) was a Danish noble, a lady in waiting and a royal mistress of King Frederick IV of Denmark.

== Early life ==
Charlotte Helene von Schindel was born as daughter of Wiglas von Schindel and his wife, Anna Helen von Horn. Her family were once ruling Dukes of Bernstadt and belonged to German nobility, originally from Silesia. She became the lady in waiting of Elisabeth Helene von Vieregg, the morganatic spouse by bigamy of King Frederik IV.

== Frederick IV's mistress ==
After the death of Vieregg in 1704, Schindel became Frederick's lover and was given the title Countess of Frederiksholm, which was an acknowledgement of her status as an official royal mistress. In 1709, the monarch planned to marry her, but those plans were met with great opposition from the church who, when the King asked them if the law against bigamy should apply also to kings, assured him that it did. She had a daughter by him (1710), who died soon after. In 1709 and 1710, Frederick IV gave her the estates Bavelse and Næsbyholm.

== Later life ==
The relationship ended in 1711; Frederick entered into his relationship with Countess Anne Sophie von Reventlow and ordered Charlotte Helene von Schindel to leave court for her estate in Själland. She initially stopped at Fyn and claimed to be pregnant with Frederick's child, but the pregnancy turned out to be false. Charlotte Helene von Schindel hosted a vivid social life at her estate and entered into a relationship with the noble Ernst G. Bülow, with whom she had a child. The couple tried to conceal the birth, but when the monarch was informed, they were given permission to marry, and did so on 9 February 1716. The whole affair attracted attention and Frederick IV ordered the couple to leave Denmark. They settled in Holstein, where they lived until Bülow's death in 1721. Von Schindel then lived with her sister in Silesia and then in Berlin, before she settled in Flensburg in Denmark in 1750.

Her relative was the Silesian noblewoman Catherine von Schindel, Duchess of Bernstadt.
