= Baum und Pferdgarten =

Danish fashion house

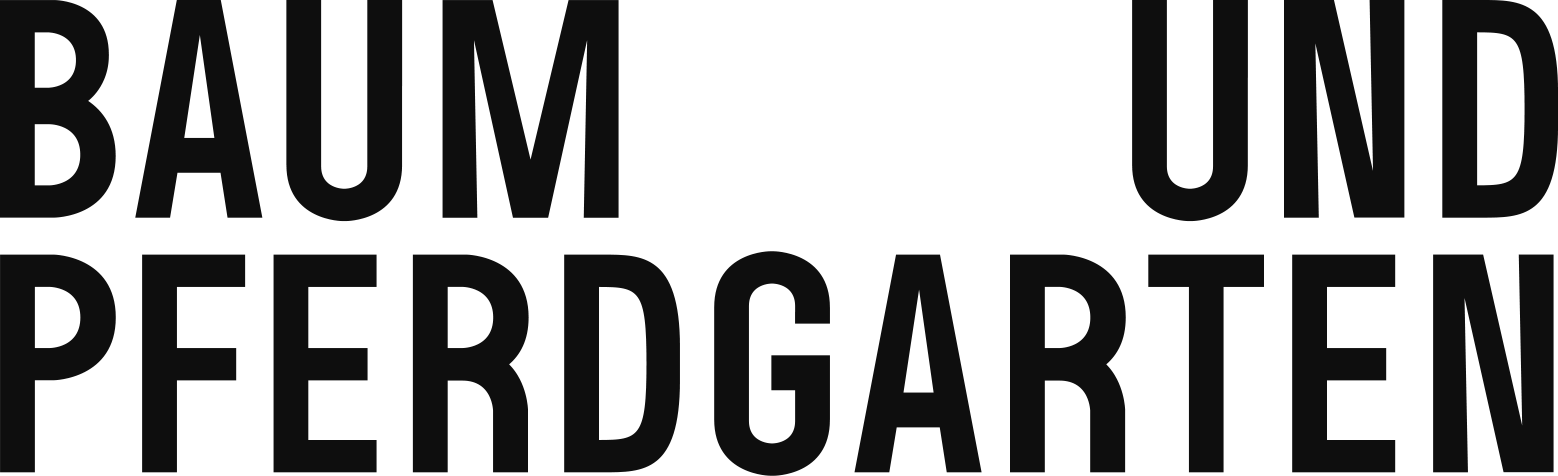
- Industry: Fashion
- Founded: 1999
- Founders: Rikke Baumgarten, Helle Hestehave
- Headquarters: Copenhagen, Denmark
- Key people: Teis Werring Bruun (CEO)
- Products: Clothing, accessories
- Website: www.baumundpferdgarten.com

Baum und Pferdgarten is a Danish fashion house founded in Copenhagen in 1999 by designers Rikke Baumgarten and Helle Hestehave.

The founders met while studying at the Royal Danish Academy of Fine Arts and began their partnership in the Nørrebro district of Copenhagen shortly after graduation.

The company faced financial difficulties in 2009, leading brothers Teis and Bjørn Werring Bruun to invest in the business and become co-owners. In 2019, the Bruun brothers, along with Baumgarten and Hestehave, sold 51% of the company to Swedish private equity firm Verdane. According to Denmark’s Central Business Register, Teis Werring Bruun remains CEO and co-owner, while Baumgarten and Hestehave continue to hold a minority stake.

The company is headquartered on Amaliegade in central Copenhagen, with its flagship store located nearby on Vognmagergade. The store opened in February 2010 and was designed in collaboration with Danish creative studios Femmes Regionales and All The Way To Paris.

As of 2025, the company reports distribution in over 30 countries through approximately 400 retail outlets, alongside online sales. In the same year, the Danish business newspaper Børsen identified Baum und Pferdgarten as one of the few Danish fashion houses consistently turning a profit, reporting annual earnings exceeding kr. 23,000,000.

In a 2021 interview, the founders discussed incorporating diversity in age, body type, gender, and ethnicity into their design philosophy. In 2020, during the COVID-19 pandemic, the company launched its Back to Back Artist Collaboration, a digital initiative supporting seven emerging visual artists inspired by Jane Freilicher and Jane Wilson.

They have dressed Crown Princess Victoria of the Swedish royal family.

== Recent collections ==
The 2025 Autumn/Winter collection titled "Heartbeats", which was staged in a parking garage with oversized red inflatable hearts, featured suiting, sequins, and practical outerwear. According to Vogue Scandinavia, design references included Alexa Chung’s style and Queen Elizabeth II’s countryside wardrobe.

== Collaborations ==
In 2024, the brand collaborated with American sneaker company Etonic to create a capsule collection. The collaboration included redesigned versions of Etonic’s Kendrai and Dropshot sneakers in colourways such as Silver Lake Blue and Rum Raisin. The collection debuted on the Autumn/Winter 2024 runway and launched online in September 2024.
