= Tersløsegaard =

PRAMOD KUMAR KAMAT

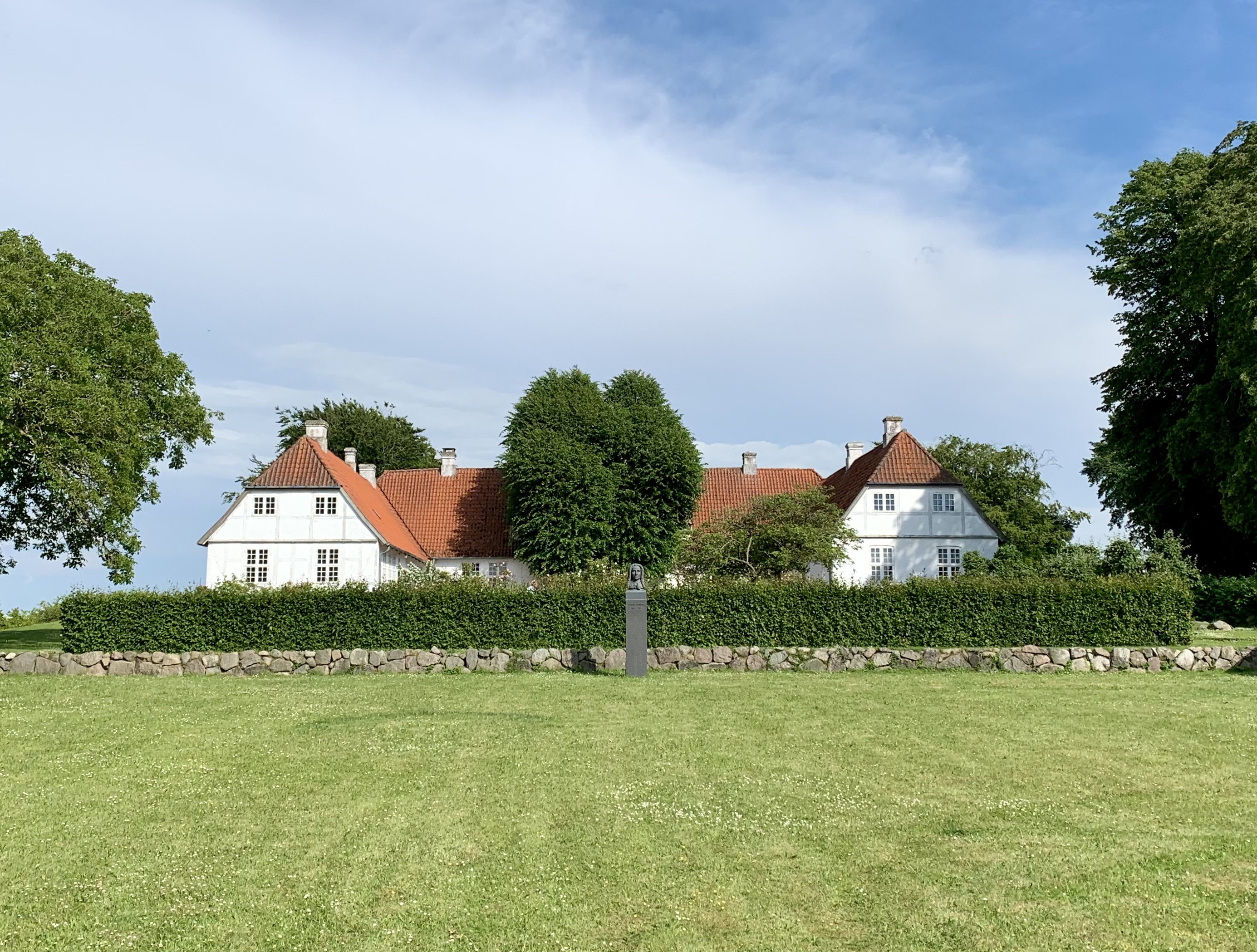
- Tersløsegård in 2022.
- Interactive map of the Tersløsegaard area

General information
- Location: Sorø Municipality, Denmark
- Coordinates: 55°30′39.8″N 11°29′25″E
- Construction started: 1802

Tersløsegaard is a manor house located close to Dianalund, Sorø Municipality some 60 kilometres southwest of Copenhagen, Denmark. It was owned by Ludvig Holberg from 1745 to 1756. He left it to Sorø Academy and it has now been converted into a self-owning foundation and contains a Holberg exhibition. The main building was listed on the Danish registry of protected buildings and places by the Danish Heritage Agency on in 1918.

== History ==
=== Early history ===
Tersløsegaard traces its history back to the 13th century. The first known owner was Anders Knudsen Grosøn. He was married to Esbern Snare's daughter. It was acquired by Jens Grubbe in 1305 and was then owned by his descendants for more than a hundred years. The last member of the Grubbe family to own Tersløsegaard was Niels Grubbe. He had no sons and the estate was therefore passed on to his son-in-law Anders Jensen Passow. Members of the Passow family owned Tersløsegaard with few interruptions until the beginning of the 16th century when it came into the possession of the Bishopric of Roskilde. It was after the Reformation confiscated by the Crown and then granted to Mads Eriksen Bølle who had assisted Christian II in the defence of Copenhagen. Both he and his daughter are buried in Terskøse Church. Tersløsegaard remained in the Bølle family until 1604. The next owner was Steen Brahe, a brother of the astronomer Tyge Brahe. He was a member of the Privy Council for 32 years and held Kalundborg Castle in fee for 28 years.

=== Lydvig Holberg and Sorø Academy ===
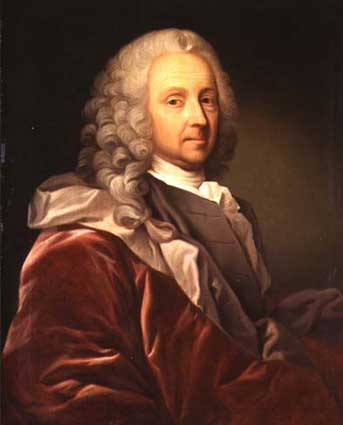
Ludvig Holberg, c. 1748

Ludvig Holberg purchased Tersløsegaard with churches and tenant farms in 1745. He had already previously acquired Brobygaard at Slagelse. He was involved in the efforts to reopen Sorø Academy. Being both unmarried childless, he agreed to leave his estates, library and most of his fortune to the academy. The agreement with the king included that Holberg earned the title of Baron of Holberg. This meant that he would be free of taxes from any income from his estatestime. The new Sorø Academy was inaugurated on 26 July 1949.

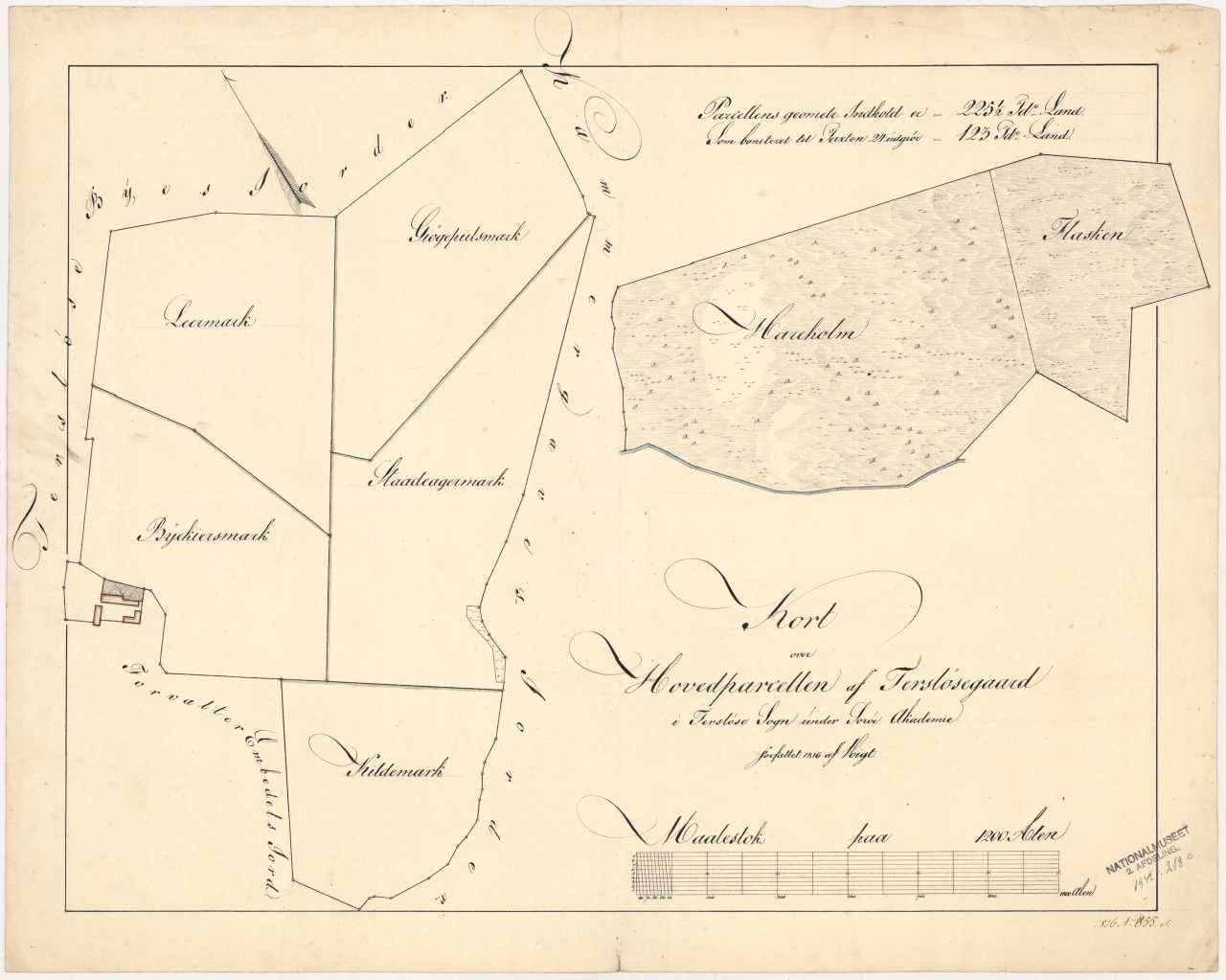
Map of the fields under Tersløsegaard, 1816

He spent his summers on the estate and commented: "I enjoy watching the crops grow and being harvested and to watch the cows walk in procession to their gathering places in the morning and evening". He lost almost all his cattle in a single week when cattle disease hit Denmark in the middle of the century. Many landowners immediately purchased new cattle and lost then again in the next outbreak but Holberg replaced them with sheep and horses.

Holberg died in 1756. Holberg's casket, a work of Johannes Wiedewelt, can be seen in Sorø Monastery Church. His will determined that a few of the rooms should be made available to a "good widow". In 1816, Sorø Academy sold most of the land off in lots. Most of the parcels were acquired by the owner of nearby Kammersgave.

=== Later history ===
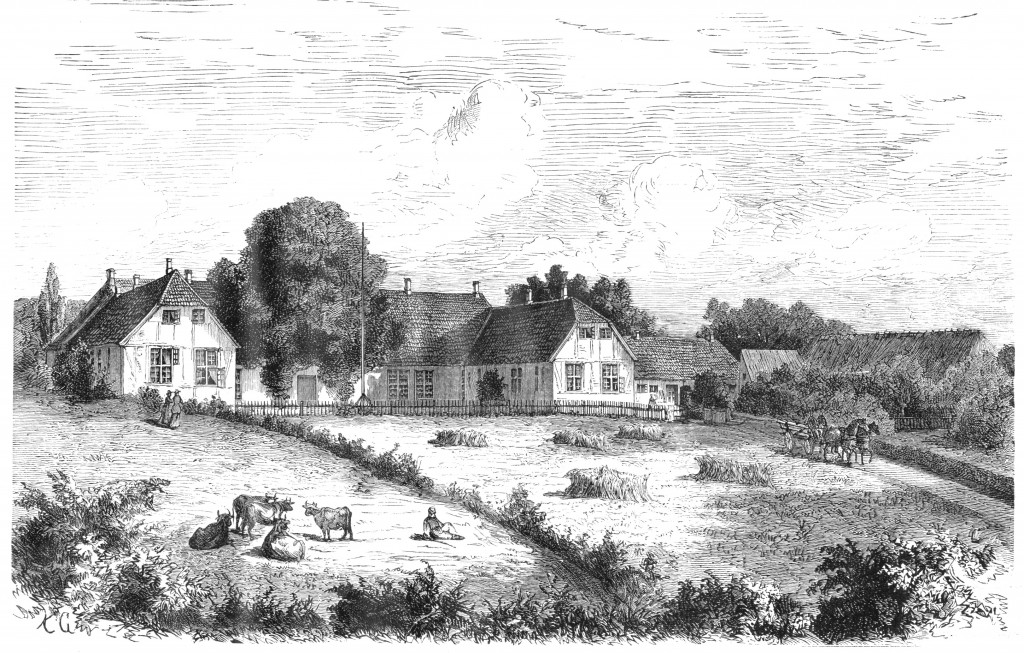
Tersløsegaard in the second half of the 19th century

The main building fell into despair and was in 1861 sold in auction. The buyer was G. F. R. Grüner, a former student at the academy. He was joined by three other former students in his effort to preserve the estate and the widow's residence. They was granted royal approval of "Four former Soranian Alumni's Preservation of Holberg's Widow Seat at Terskøsegaard" in 1862. The estate was managed by a board consisting of the count of Frijsenborg, the barons of Lehn and Juellinge and the owner of Tersløse. After G. F. R. Grüner's death in 1890 Tersløsegaard once again fell into neglect and the remaining land was sold off.

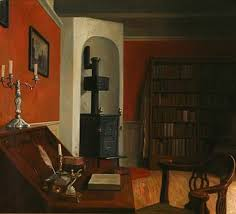
Holberg's library at Tersløsegaard, 1919

The Soranian Society of former students at Sorø Academy established a fubnd-raising committee. It acquired Terskøsegaard in 1905 and completed a comprehensive refurbishment of the building in 1916. It was subsequently turned into a self-owning institution.

== Architecture ==
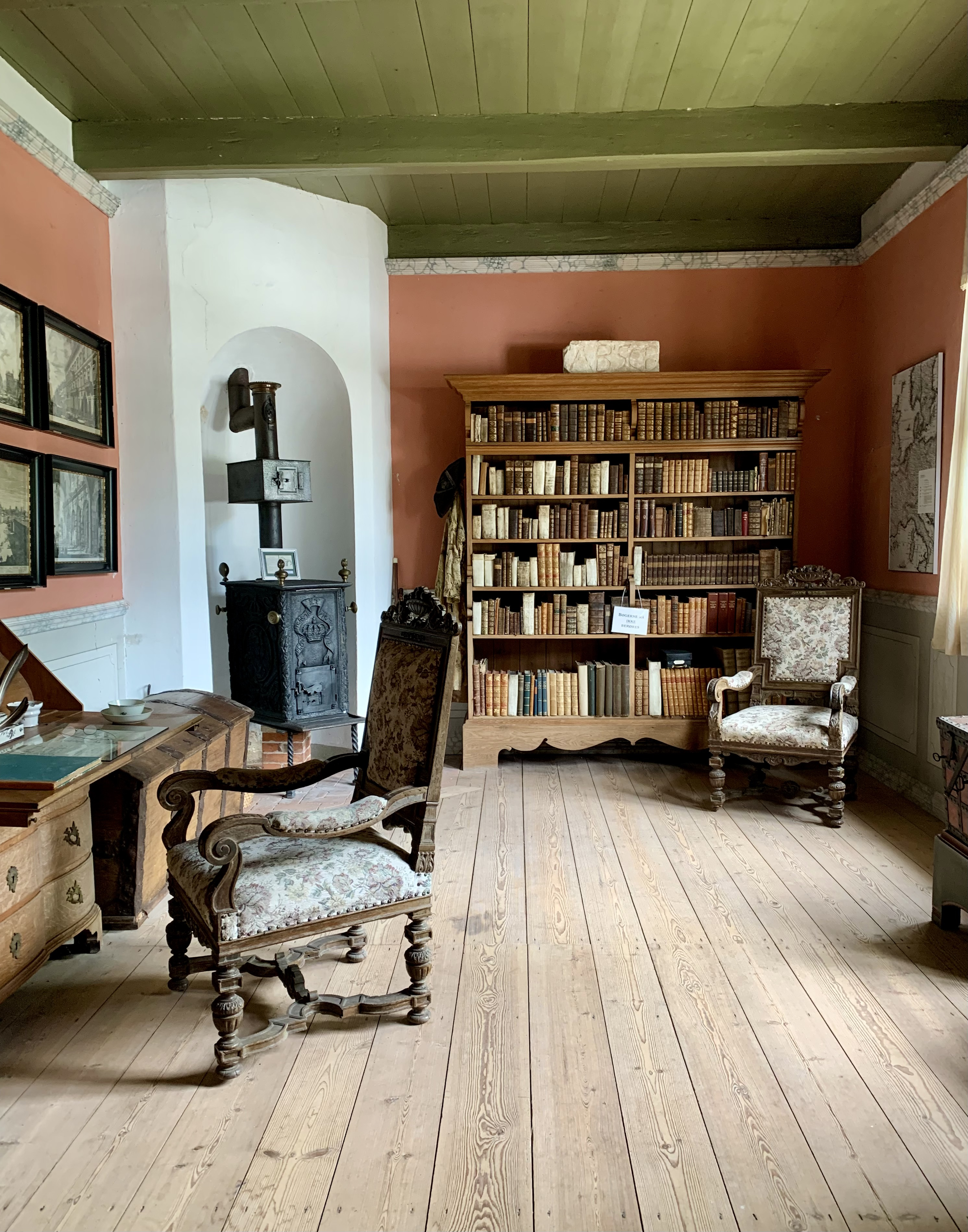
Interior.

Tersløsegaard is a three-winged complex with a half hipped red tile roof. It is built with timber framing but has been rendered white. The oldest part of the building is from 1832. It was lengthened and expanded with the two side wings in the second half of the century. The cellar is from the Middle Ages. It was thoroughly restored by Martin Nyrop iafter the committee had acquired the building in 1905. The building was also refurbished in 1930 and 2012.

The building was listed on the Danish registry of protected buildings and places by the Danish Heritage Agency on 23 December 1982.

== Garden ==
The garden was redesigned by Carl Theodor Sørensen in 1957 and later adapted by Svend-Ingvar Anderson in 1978–1979.

== List of owners ==
- (1200-t. ) Anders Knudsen Grosøn
- (1305- ) Jens Grubbe
- ( -1360) Jon Grubbe
- (1360- ) Niels Grubbe
- ( - ) Saxe Grubbe
- ( - ) Ingemar Grubbe
- (1383–1412) Tyge Ingemarsen Grubbe
- (1411- ) Niels Tygesen Grubbe
- ( -1465) Anders Jensen Passow
- (1465- ) Christoffer Andersen Passow
- ( -1506) Anders Christoffersen Passow
- (1499- ) Niels Andersen
- (1506- ) Anne Andersdatter Passow, gift Andersen
- ( -1536) Roskilde Biscopic
- (1536) The Crown
- (1536–1539) Mads Eriksen Bølle
- (1539- ) Erik Madsen Bølle
- ( - ) Jesper Krafse
- ( -1620) Steen Brahe
- (1620–1651) Otte Steensen Brahe
- (1651–1668) Henrik Ottesen Lindenov
- (1668–1683) Henrik Bjelke
- (1683–1720) Poul Klingenberg
- (1720–1737) Alexander Thielemann Heespen
- (1737–1743) Frederikke Klingenberg, gift Heespen
- (1743–1745) Johannes Christensen
- (1745–1754) Ludvig Holberg
- (1754–1861) Sorø Academy
- (1861–1890) J. G. R. Grüner
- (1890–1905) G. F.R. Grüner
- (1905–1917) Tersløsekomite (Soransk Samfund)
- (1917–present) Den Holbergske Stiftelse Tersløsegaar* d

== See also ==
- Template:Sorø Municipality
- Brorupgaard
