= Juellund =

Manor house and estate in Ringsted, Denmark

- Interactive map of the Juellund area

General information
- Location: Slimmingevej 30; 4100 Ringsted, Denmark
- Completed: 1918

Juellund is a manor house and estate in Køge Municipality, Denmark. It was established by Jens Juel in 1694 but has been part of the Giesegaard estate since 1751.

== History ==
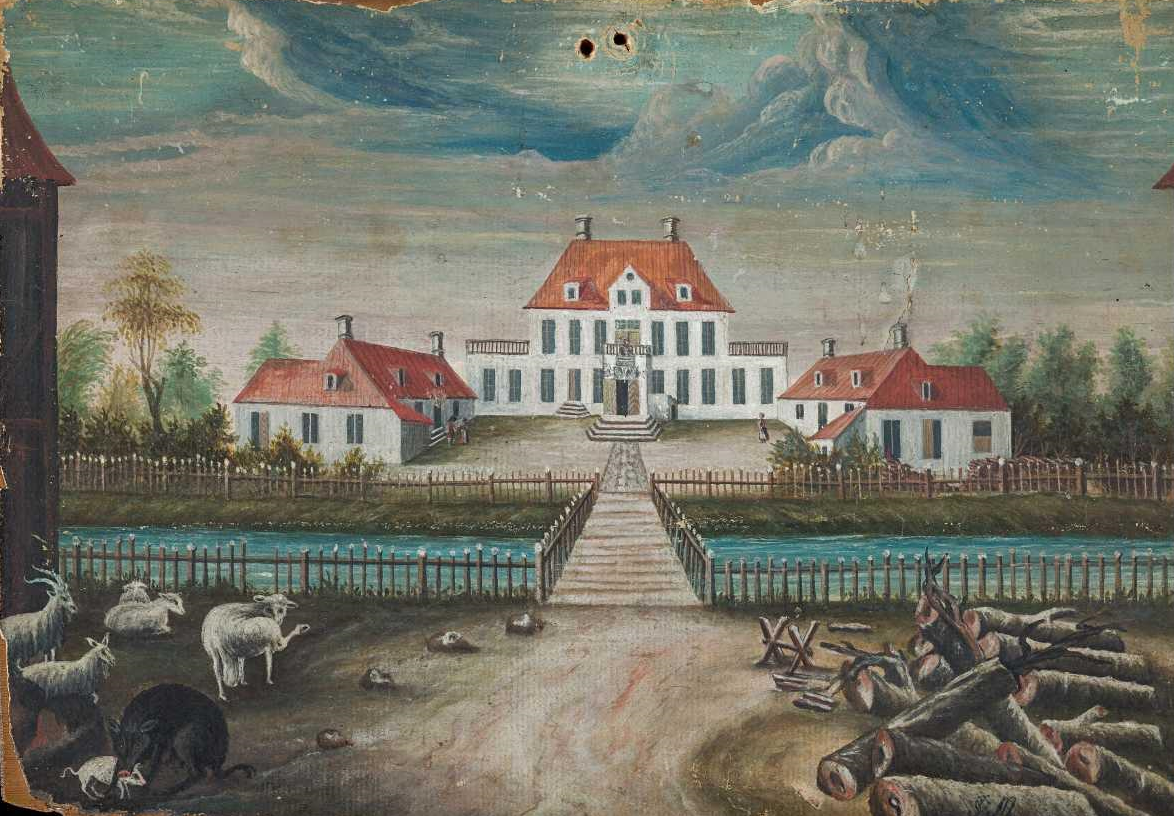
Juellund

Juellund was established when Jens Juel purchased and merged the old manors of Jonstrup and Herlufstrup in 1694. It is a typical example of the concentration of land on fewer manors that took place up through the 17th century. Juel belonged to the inner circle around first Christian V and then Frederick IV. He expanded the estate through the acquisition of more land prior to his death in 1700.

Juel's widow, Dorothea Krag, married Christian Gyldenløve who sold Juellund to Hans Benzon om 1702. The estate changed hands several times over the next 50 years. In 1751, Juellund was sold to Anna Sophie Schack, one of the largest landowners in the country. She included the estate in stamhuset Giesegaard. Stamhuset Giesegaard was dissolved in 1922 as a result of lansafløsningsloven.

== List of owners ==
- Jonstrup og Herlufstrup, –1694
- Jens Juel, 1694–1700
- Dorothea Juel née Krag, 1700–1701
- Christian Gyldenløve, 1701–1702
- Hans Benzon, 1702–1715
- Søren Severin Benzon, 1715–1717
- Morten Glede, 1717–1729
- Niels Foss, 1729–1751
- Fr. Ehlers, 1751–1752
- Fr. Güntelberg, 1751–1752
- H. Heglund, 1751–1752
- E.L. Ernst, 1751–1752
- Anna Sophie Schack, 1752–1760
- Stamhuset Giesegård, 1752–1922
- Adolph Brockehuus-Schack, 1922–1924
- Frederik Brockenhuus-Schack, 1924–1963
- Niels Brockenhuus-Schack, 1963–1993
- Michael Brockenhuus-Schack, 1993–present
