= Eskil Gøye =

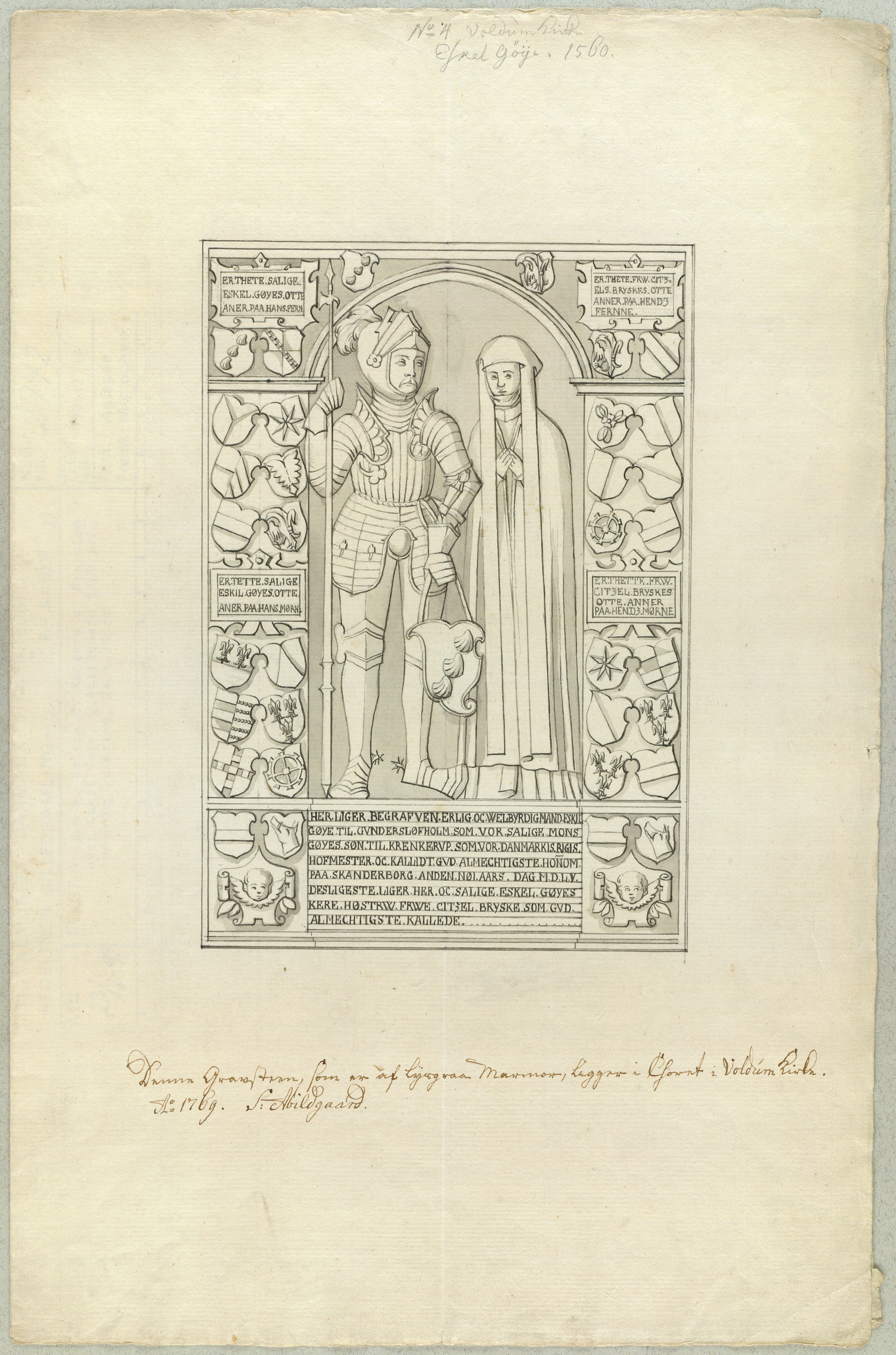
The ledgerstone of Eskil Gøye. Drawing by Søren Abildgaard, 1769.

Eskil Gøye (also spelled Eskild; died 20 April 1506) was a Danish nobleman, statesman and landholder. He served as Marshal of the Realm from 1489 to 1502. He was the father of Mogens Gøye and Henrik Gøye.

== Early life ==
Gøye was the son of Mogens Axelsen Gøye (died 1450 or later) and Ide Eskilsdatter Falk. He is mentioned as a knight in 1459.

== Property ==
He inherited Krenkerup on Lolland and Gisselfeld on Zealand. He also owned Tunbyholm in Skåne. He was lensmand of Aalholm on Lolland (from c. 1473 to 1494) and Lindholm in Skåne (from 1495). In c. 1493, he acquired Torsjö in Skåne as mortgage.

== Public offices ==
In 1473, as part of a large delegation, he was sent to England and Scotland. He was a member of the Privy Council (rigsråd) from at least 1475 and participated as such in the meetings in Kalmar in 1483 and 1495, and in Lödöse in 1494.

In 1489, he was appointed as Marshal of the Realm. He led the Danish invasion of Sweden in 1497. He does not seem to have participated in the following campaigns against Ditmarsken in 1500 and Sweden in 1502. In 1502, he was succeeded as Marshal of the Realm by Tyge Krabbe.

== Personal life and legacy ==
Gøye married in c. 1470 to Mette Rosenkrantz (died 1503), daughter of d. af Erik Ottesen Rosenkrantz (c. 1427–1503) and Sophie Gyldenstierne (died 1477). He was second time married to He Sidsel Brahe (died 1532 or later), daughter of Axel Brahe (died 1487) and Maren Tygesdatter Lunge (died 1520 or later). His first wife bore him two sons, Mogens Gøye and Henrik Gøye.

He died on 20 April 1506 at Torsjö and is buried in Maribo Cathedral. He installed King John as executor of his will. It left considerable wealth to the church. His eldest son Mogens Gøye received Krenkerup. Henrik Gøye received Gisselfeld.

== See also ==
- Gøye family
