= Gisselfeld =

Manor house in Faxe Municipality, Denmark

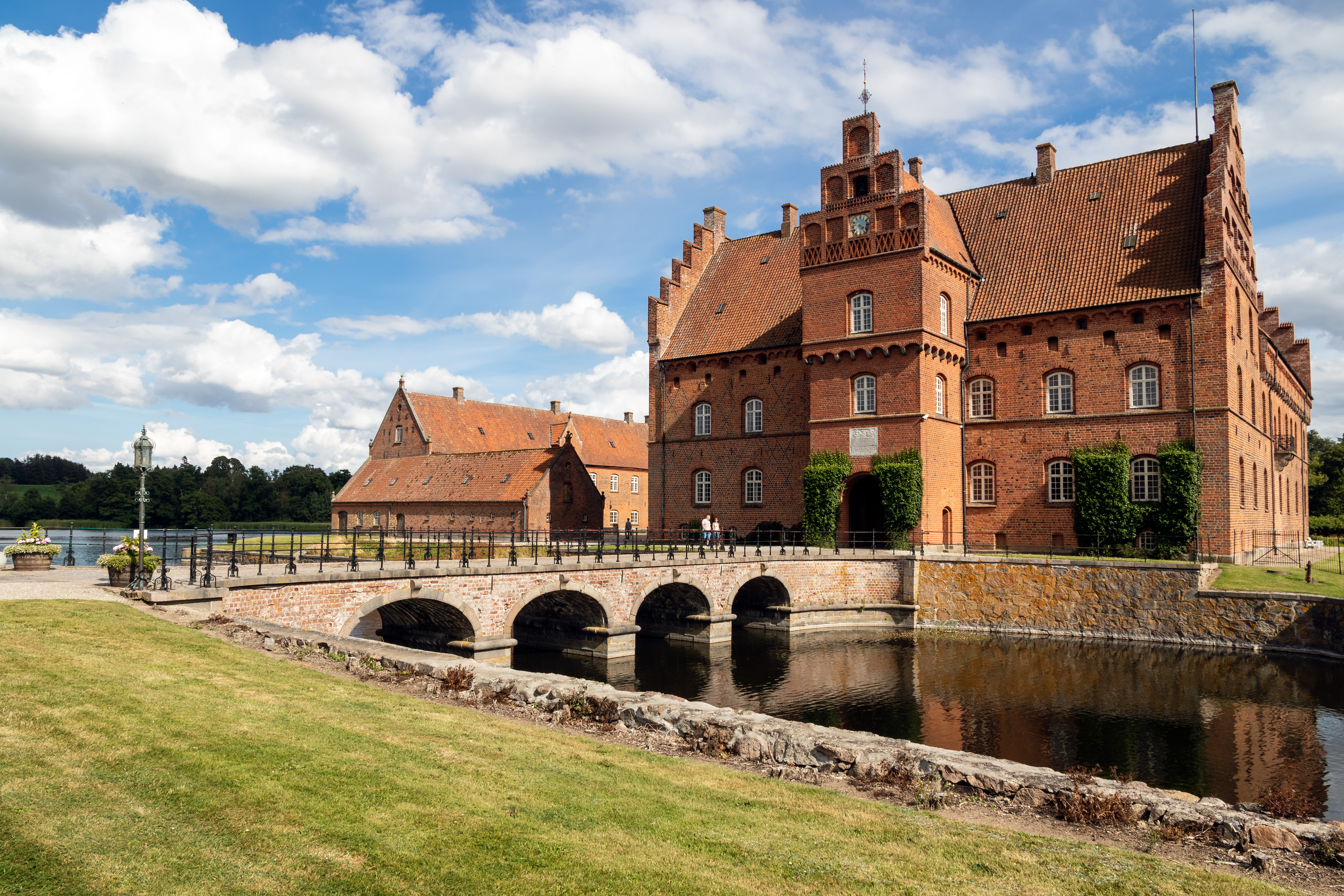
- Interactive map of the Gisselfeld area

General information
- Location: Gisselfeldvej 5; 4690 Haslev, Denmark
- Coordinates: 55°17′20″N 11°58′14″E
- Completed: 1575

Gisselfeld, a former monastery, is Denmark's fifth-largest estate. Located between Haslev and Næstved, it extends into several municipalities but the main building is located in Braaby Parish in Faxe Municipality.

The estate measures 3,850 hectares, including Hesede, Edelesminde, Brødebæk and Gødstrupgård, of which 2,400 hectares is forest. The three-storeyed Renaissance-style building has stepped gables, loopholes and a projecting tower over the main gate. The grounds include a moat, a well-kept park, lake, waterfall, gardens, greenhouse, and a fountain. A recent addition in its forest is a 45-meter-tall (148 ft) hyperboloid tower.

== History ==
=== Falk and Goye ===
Gisselfeld is first mentioned at the end of the 14th century when the owner was Bo Falk. At that time, there was a small manor situated some 2 km northwest of the site of today's main building. It stood next to an older fort, possibly the now demolished Valgestrup.

Gisselfeld was later owned by Bo Falk's son Peder Falk and grandson Eskild Falk. The latter's daughter Ida was married to Mogens Axelsen Gøye. Their son, Eskil Gøye, owned Gisselfeld from 1450. His other holdings included Krenkerup on Lolland and Turnbyholm in Skåne as well as the fiefs of Aalholm and Lindholm. He served as rigsmarsk from 1489.

Gisselfeld was upon Eskil Gøye's death in 1506 passed to his son Henrik Gøye. Krenkerup went to Henrik Jøye's elder brother Mogens Gøye. Henrik Gøye served as governor during the siege of Copenhagen. In c. 1523, he had to mortgage Gisselfeld to his cousin Otte Holgersen Rosenkrantz and brother Mogens Gøye.

=== Oxe and Lykke families ===
Today's estate was founded by Peder Oxe, who built the manor from 1547 to 1575. It originally consisted of four interconnected red-brick wings, three storeys high with thick outer walls, a number of loopholes and large stepped gables. A protruding gate tower stands at the centre of the left wing. The fourth wing, now demolished, housed a chapel.

After Peder Oxe's death, his widow Mette Rosenkrantz of Vallø became the owner of the estate. After her death in 1588, her niece Karen Banner inherited Gisselfeld. She married Henrik Lykke of Overgaard whose family ran the estate until Kai Lykke was executed and relieved of all his rights in 1661.

=== Changing owners 1661–1688 ===
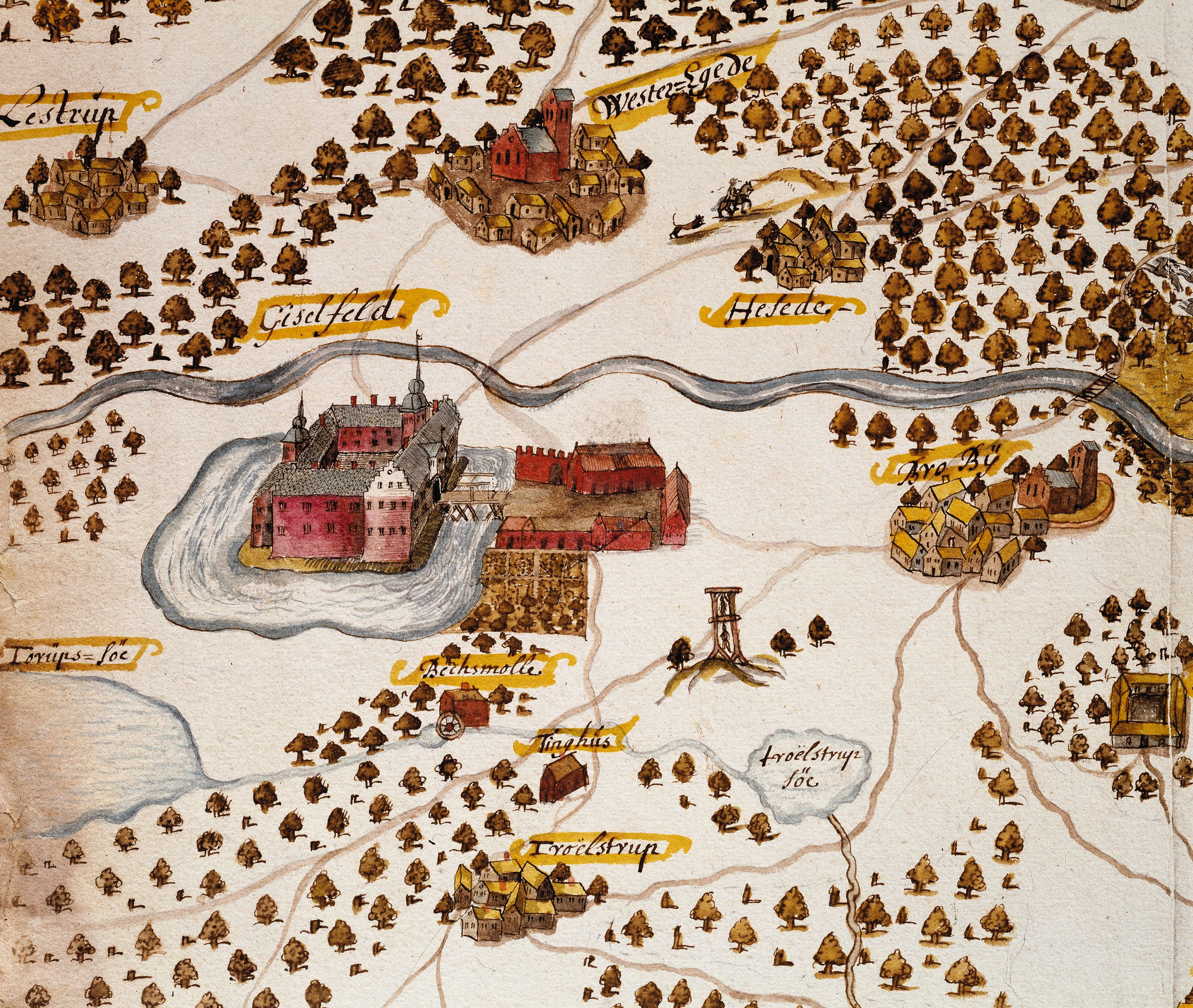
Map from c. 1670

After a short period of ownership by the Crown, in 1670 the property was presented to Count Hans Schack as a reward for the part he played in the Swedish wars. In 1688, his son Otto Diderik sold the estate to Adam Levin Knuth whose family maintained ownership until 1699.

=== Convent ===
In 1699, Christian Gyldenløve took over the property. He was the illegitimate son of Christian V. Gyldenløve's will stipulated that the manor should be owned by his second wife for the remainder of her life, provided that the maintained it. After they had both died, it was then to become a convent. Therefore, when Gyldenløve died in 1703, Gisselfeld passed to his widow, Dorothea Krag. After her death in 1754, the property was inherited by their grandson, Frederik Christian Danneskiold-Samsøe. Since 1755, his descendants have run the estate as "Gisselfeld Adelige Jomfrukloster I Sjælland" (transl. Gisselfeld Convent in Zealand for Virgins of Noble Birth). The 11th in the family's line, Helene Danneskiold-Samsøe, has run Gisselfeld since 2010.

== Geography ==
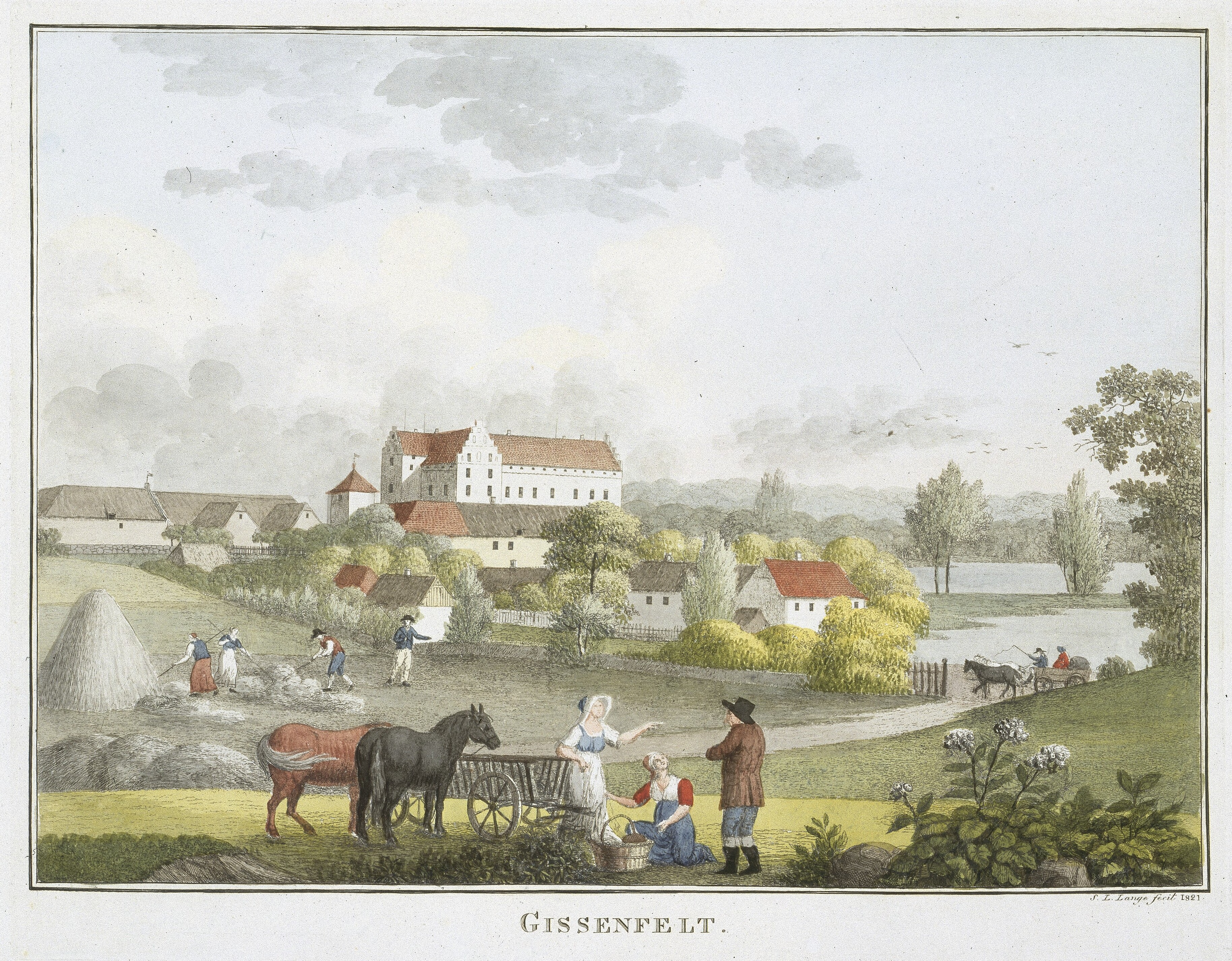
Illustration of Gisselfeld in 1821 by Søren Læssøe Lange

Gisselfeld is Denmark's fifth-largest land estate, covering an area of 3,850 hectares. It is set in a scenic forested environment in an area of lakes and hills. It was known for its wildlife and organic farming until ownership legally changed hands in 1996. Subsequently, organic farming was discontinued and replaced by logging of the forests. The hunting grounds have been leased out.

The property was surrounded by moats on three sides, the gårdsø (estate lake) flanking the north side. Water spouts from the four frogs that embellish a fountain on the property.

== Legal status ==
In the seventeenth century Gisselfeld was within consecutive Birks, so had separate legal jurisdiction from Bråby Sogn (Braaby Parish) and old Ringsted Herred (hundred). Special inheritance laws were enacted in 1701 and 1702 that define the inheritance laws of the castles and estates, promulgated by Christian Gyldenløve, son of the Danish King Christian V. Under this law, the present Count of Gisselfeld was the director of the estate and ran this estate until 1996 when a new Board was instituted by the Ministry of Justice and the Directorate of Civil Rights. This change was challenged by the Count, and became a well-publicized legal case.

== Gallery ==
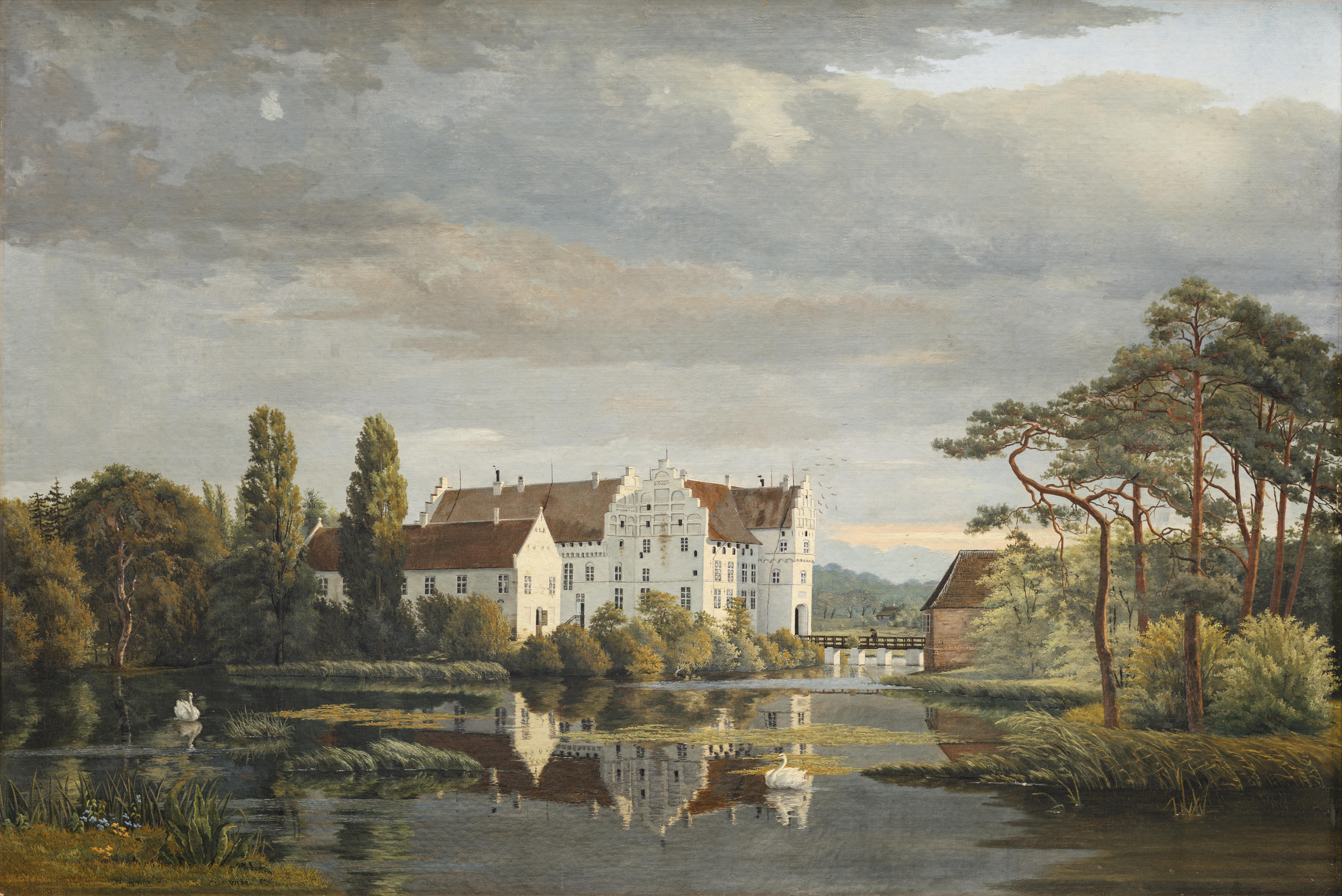
Herregården Gisselfeld på Sjælland (1839), by C.V.M. Jensen

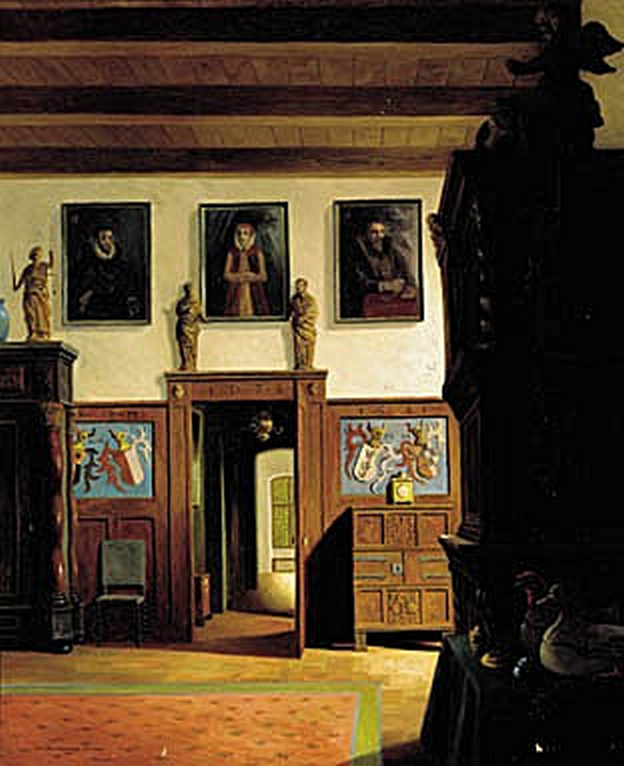
Interior fra Gisselfeld (1918), by Christian Tilemann-Petersen

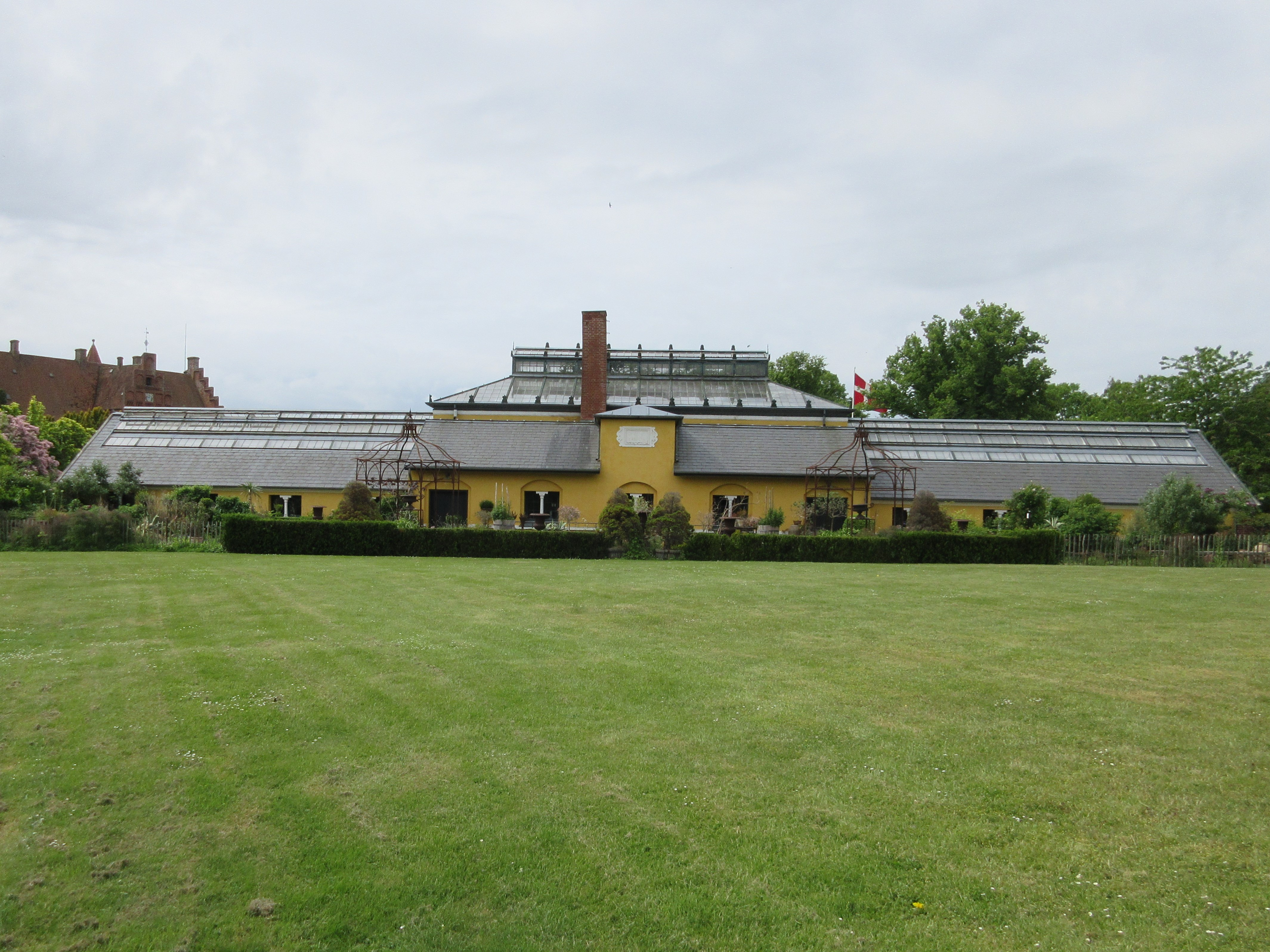
The Paradehus at Gisselfeld in 2020

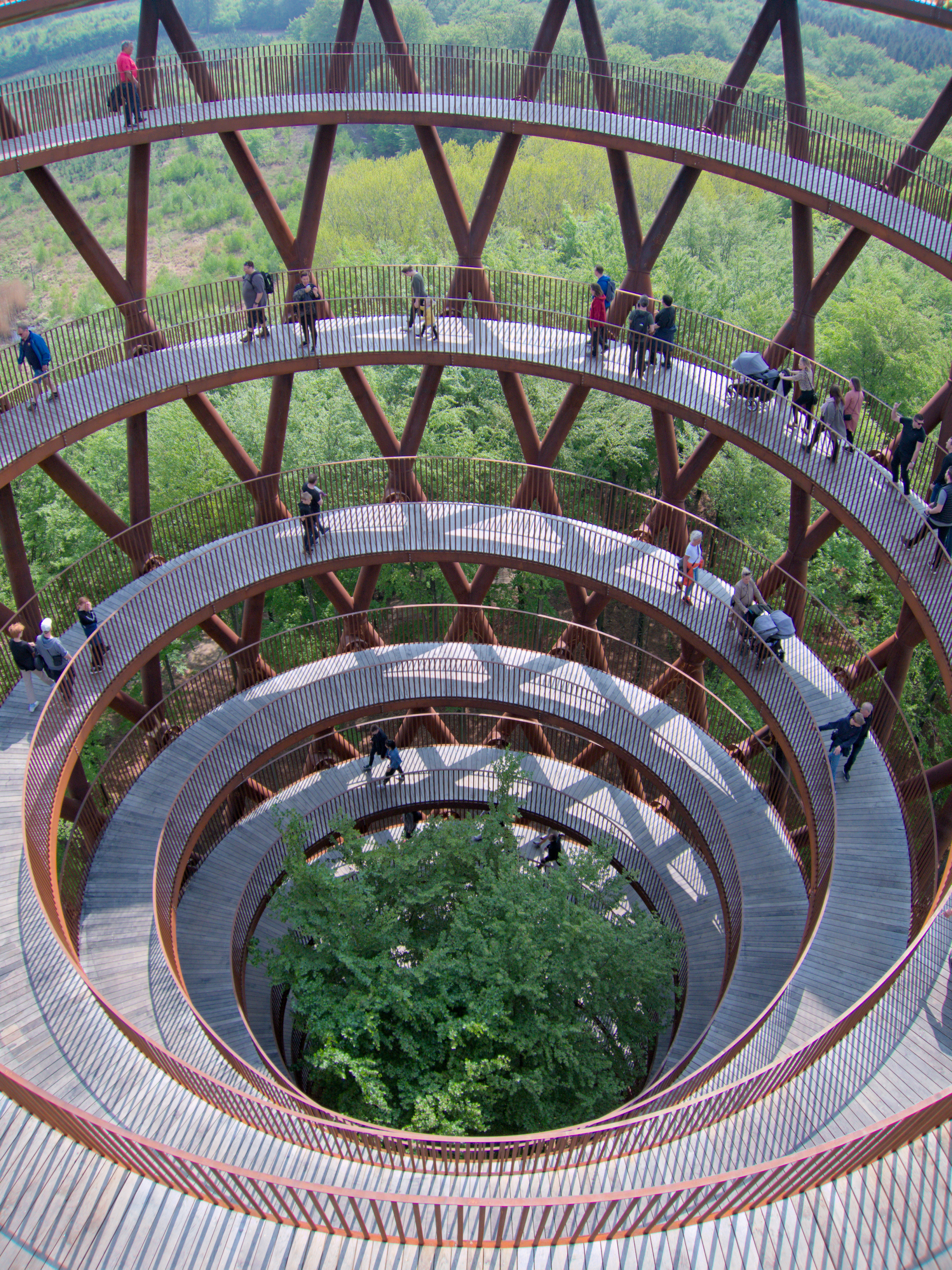
View from inside Skovtårnet (lit. 'The Forest Tower'), which was erected in 2018

== Owners ==
- Bo Falk, 1381–1411
- Peder Falk, 1411–1431
- Eskild Falk, 1431–1450
- Ida Gøye née Falk, 1450
- Eskil Gøye, 1450–1506
- Henrik Gøye, 1506–1526
- Johan Oxe, 1526–1537
- Torben Oxe, 1537–1545
- Peder Oxe, 1545–1575
- Mette Oxe née Rosenkrantz, 1575–1588
- Karen Lykke née Banner, 1588
- Christian Lykke, 1588–1619
- Frands Lykke, 1619–1655
- (1655–1661) Kai Lykke
- The Crown, 1661–1670
- Hans Schack, 1670
- Ditlev von Rumohr, 1670
- Hans Schack, 1670–1682
- Otto Diderik Schack, 1682–1688
- Sophie Dorothea Schack née Marschall, 1688–1689
- Adam Levin Knuth, 1689–1699
- Christian Gyldenløve, 1699–1703
- Dorothea Krag, 1703–1754
- Frederik Christian Danneskiold-Samsøe, 1754–1755
- Gisselfeld Adelige Jomfrukloster i Sjælland, 1755–present
