= Michael Brockenhuus-Schack =

Danish agronomist

Michael Brockenhuus-Schack (born 20 April 1960) is a Danish count, landowner, chamberlain and board member. He owns Giesegaard and Juellund at Ringsted.

== Early life and education ==
Michael Brockenhuus-Schack is the son of count Niels Brockenhuus-Schack and his wife Madeleine Maria née d'Auchamp. He has a bachelor of Business from Copenhagen Business School (1983) and a cand.agro. degree from the Royal Veterinary and Agricultural University (1989).

== Career ==
Brockenhuus-Schack worked for Danske Bank in 1988–95. He took over the family estate after his father in 1993. He was chair of Landbrug & Fødevarer in 2009–11. He has been a board member of Realdania since 2006 and the chair since 2014. He has been a board member of Det Classenske Fideicommis since 2007.

== Personal life ==
He is married to Ulla Brockenhuus-Schack who is a managing partner in Seed Capital. They have two children. He was operated on for colorectal cancer in 2011.
