= Hedevig Johanne Bagger =

Hedevig Johanne Bagger (November 1740- May 4, 1822) was a Danish inn-keeper and postmaster.

== Biography ==
She was born the port of Korsør in Sorø, Denmark. She was the daughter of merchant Rasmus Langeland (1712–80) and Anne Marie Jensdatter (1714–78). Her father ran a successful business as co-owner of the ferry connection to Funen. Her brother Jens Christian Langeland (1737-1770) was later mayor and customs officer in the city.

She was married in 1761 to Marcus Marcussen Bagger who was the estate manager at the main farm Saltø near Næstved. Her husband died at the age of 44 in February 1770 and her brother later that same year. She bought one of Korsør's larger guesthouses which within a few years was expanded into an inn. In connection with another rebuilding in the early 1780s, a post office was established in property. She applied to establish the local post office in 1782 and was in 1798 named royal postmaster. She was unique in her position: there were female postmasters before her, but they were women who inherited their office from their spouses, while Bagger was the first woman to have been granted the position herself. She retired from the postal office and sold the inn during 1810.

== See also ==
- Dorothea Krag
