= Katharina Henot =

German woman accused of witchcraft (1570–1627)

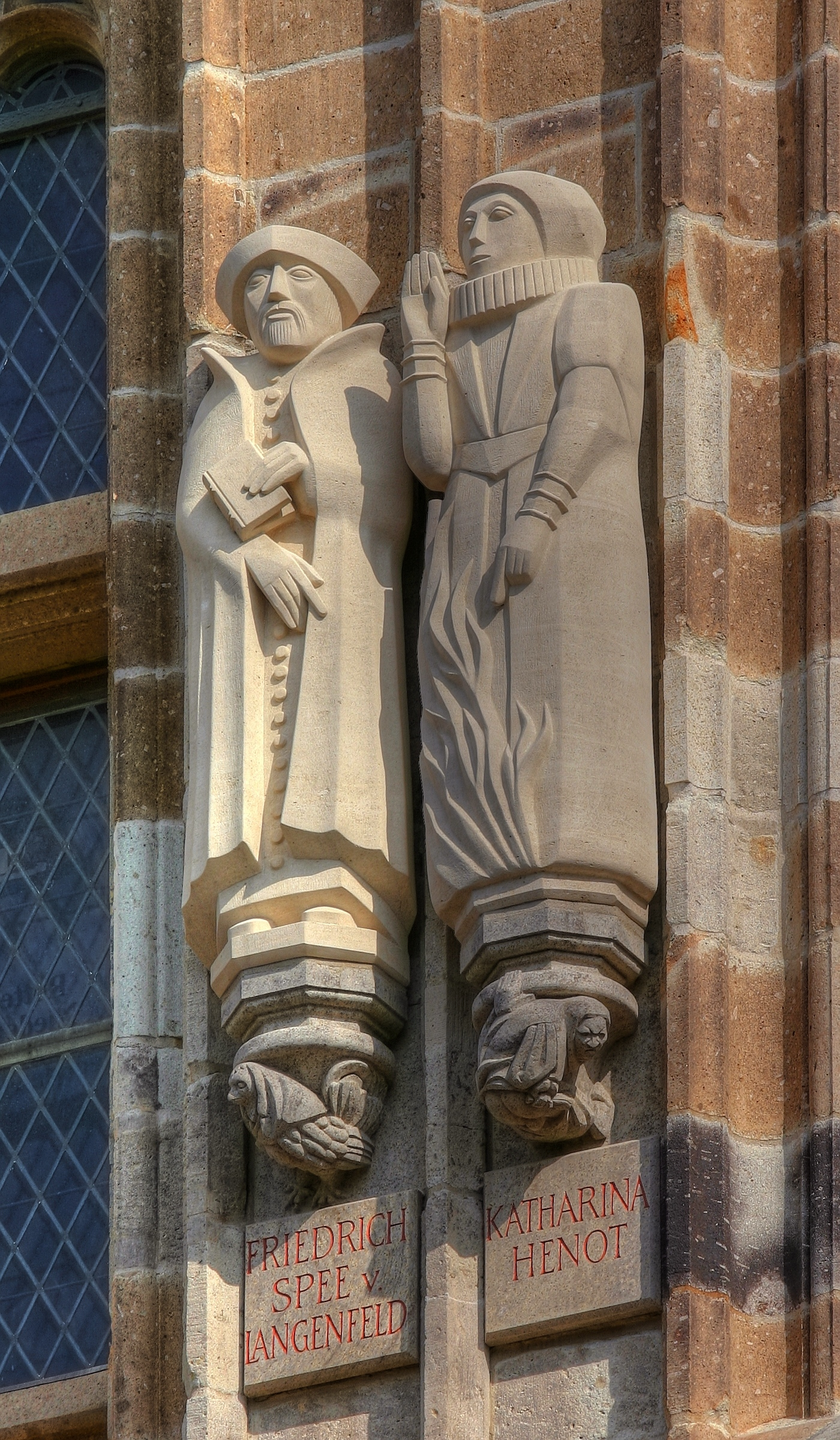
Statues of Friedrich Spee and Katharina Henot at the city hall tower of Cologne

Katharina Henot (also known as Catherina or Henoth) (1570 – 19 May 1627) was a German postmaster and alleged witch, burned at the stake for sorcery in Cologne. She is one of the best-known German victims of the witch hunt, and the best known case in Cologne. She was probably also the first female postmaster in Germany.

== Biography ==
Katharina Henot was born around the year 1570 to Adelheid Henotte and imperial postmaster Jakob Henot. Katharina had twenty siblings, one of whom was her brother, Hartger Henot.

She married postal manager Heinrich Neuden, with whom she had a daughter, and was widowed by the early 1620s.

Some time before 1623, Henot's parents lost their assets to the government after a failed investment in a courier service. Their assets and post office were restored by the emperor in 1623. Upon the death of Henot's father Jakob in November 1625, Henot and her brother Hartger hid Jakob's death from the authorities and ran the post office themselves. Some historians subsequently consider Henot to be the first known woman to act as a postmaster in Germany.

== Witch trial ==
=== Accusations: 1626 ===
Throughout the sixteenth century, Cologne's municipal high court judges were sceptical of witchcraft, meaning that few witches were arrested and none were executed. A new slate of judges that took office in the early seventeenth century reversed this trend.

In early 1626, nuns from the convent of St. Clare began to suspect fellow nun Sophie Agnes von Langenfeld of witchcraft. They soon extended their accusations beyond the walls of the convent, spreading rumours that Henot had used magic to make several residents of Cologne ill, some to the point of death. Henot, who was also accused of using magic to infest the convent with caterpillars, was likely targeted due to jealousy over her wealth.

Upon hearing the nuns' accusations, Henot protested her innocence in writing to the Electorate of Cologne in August 1626. She also threatened to take legal action against the convent if the rumours persisted. Nonetheless, the ecclesiastical authorities did not intervene, and Cologne's city council soon received a formal complaint alleging that Henot was a witch. Henot subsequently instructed her lawyer to begin a purgation trial in December 1626, but the action proved fruitless when Sophie Agnes von Langenfeld accused Henot of being a witch in January 1627.

=== Trial and execution: 1626 ===
In early 1627, Henot was arrested on the orders of Ferdinand of Bavaria, and tortured on at least three occasions. Although the Reichskammergericht ruled in April 1627 that Henot should be released, Cologne's judges ignored the ruling. Her brother Hartger also petitioned unsuccessfully for her exoneration. During her incarceration, Henot was able to smuggle two letters from prison to Hartger; the second was penned with her left hand, as her right arm was too injured to function.

Although Henot did not confess to the allegations against her, she was condemned to death in May 1627. On 19 May 1627, Henot was paraded through the streets of Cologne before being strangled, then burned alive at the stake.

Following Henot's execution, Hartger continued his bid to clear his sister's name until 1629, when he, too, was accused of witchcraft by a local woman named Christina Plum. The case against Hartger led to his arrest in 1631, but he was ultimately spared from a trial.

== Legacy ==
After her death, Hartger used Henot's assets to create a scholarship fund in 1628 that lasted until the 20th century.

=== Exoneration ===
In the 21st century, Hartmut Hegeler, a Protestant pastor and activist for exonerating victims of witchcraft trials, lodged a request with the City Council of Cologne to exonerate Henot. A distant relative of Henot's, Martina Hirtz, also supported the efforts.

The council subsequently issued a resolution on 28 June 2012, exonerating Henot and other victims of the persecution of supposed witches in Cologne. Hegeler spoke to the media after Henot's exoneration: "I’m thrilled because they tried to silence her forever but that didn’t succeed... To this day they talk about her fate in this city.”

== See also ==
- Gese Wechel, Swedish equivalent
- Dorothea Krag, Danish equivalent
- Alexandrine von Taxis, Imperial equivalent
