= Kai Lykke =

Danish nobleman and courtier

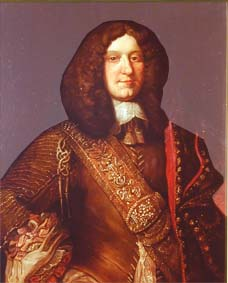
Kai Lykke (1625-1699)

Kai Lykke or Cai Lykke (16 March 1625 – 9 September 1699) was a Danish nobleman and courtier.

== Biography ==
Lykke was born at Gisselfeld in Zealand, Denmark. He was the son of nobleman Frands Lykke (1591–1655) and the nephew of Anne Lykke (1595–1641), royal mistress of Christian, Prince Elect of Denmark. His grandfather Henrik Lykke (1555-1611) was a member of the Danish Council (Riksråd) who had accumulated substantial estates in Denmark.

He was a courtier in 1646-1648 and an early supporter of Corfitz Ulfeldt (1606–1664). At the death of his father in 1656, Lykke inherited seven estates and became one of the richest landowners in Denmark. He became known for his debauched and expensive lifestyle. During the Dano-Swedish War (1657–58) was the commander of his own army in 1657 but was dismissed by royal decree in 1658. In 1660, he married Øllgaard Gyldenstierne.

Lykke is foremost known for the 1661 scandal in which he accused Queen Sophie Amalie of adultery by writing to his mistress Sophie Abelsdatter that the queen used to have sexual relations with her lackeys. This letter was exposed to the queen, and Lykke was sentenced to a great fine. When he fled to Skåne instead of paying, he was sentenced to death for Lèse-majesté, was executed in his absence, and had his property in Denmark confiscated. He was allowed to return to Denmark after 24 years of exile following the death of Queen Sophie Amalie in 1685.

== Fiction ==
Kai Lykke was featured in the novel Gjøngehøvdingen (1853) by Carit Etlar (1816–1900) and portrayed by actor Flemming Enevold in the 1992 TV-series of the same name made from the novel.
