= Søren Læssøe Lange =

Danish painter and illustrator

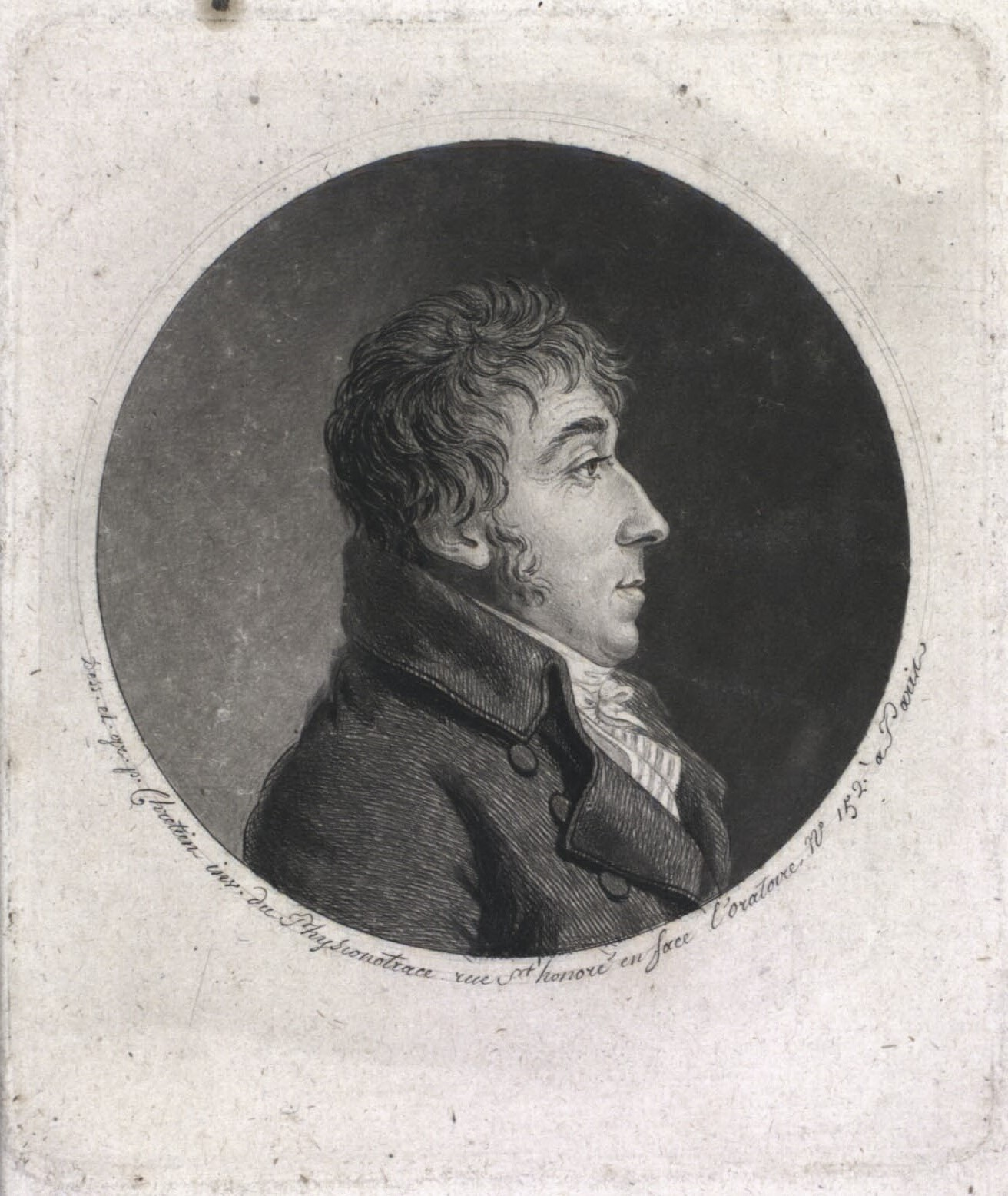
- Copper engraving of Søren Læssøe Lange, produced by Gilles-Louis Chrétien
- Born: 5 May 1760; Faaborg, Denmark
- Died: 19 June 1828 (aged 68); Copenhagen, Denmark

Søren Læssøe Lange (5 May 1760 – 19 June 1828) was a Danish painter and illustrator. He is mostly remembered for his topographical watercolours and drawings of landscapes, cityscapes, and gardens in the 19th century. He lived much of his life in Denmark-Norway.

== Biography ==
Lange was born on 4 May 1760 in Faaborg, the son of master painter Jesper Henric Johansen Lange and Dorthea Hansdatter Læssøe. He completed a painter's apprenticeship with his father in 1781. He received his journeyman's certificate on 21 May 1781.

That year, he enrolled at the Royal Danish Academy of Fine Arts where he studied from 1781 until 1787. He won the Academy's small and large silver medals in 1785 and 1787, respectively. In 1814, his work was displayed at the Charlottenborg Spring Exhibition. He died on 19 June 1828 in Copenhagen and was buried at Helligåndskirken.

== Works ==
In the beginning of his career, Lange created some portraits. He later turned to exclusively painting and drawing landscapes and buildings from different parts of Denmark. His watercolour paintings appear to have taken stylistic inspiration from Jens Juel. In 1820, he visited the island of Bornholm.

Lange worked in watercolour, gouache, and engraving. A large portion of his body of work consists of illustrations of newly created romantic gardens in Denmark, including those at Enrum, Jægerspris Castle, Liselund, and Marienborg. In many of his depictions of these estates, he had a tendency to depict buildings as larger and more impressive that they were in reality, to great effect. He also has created a substantial number of drawings and watercolours of monuments and tombstones, of which many have been lost.

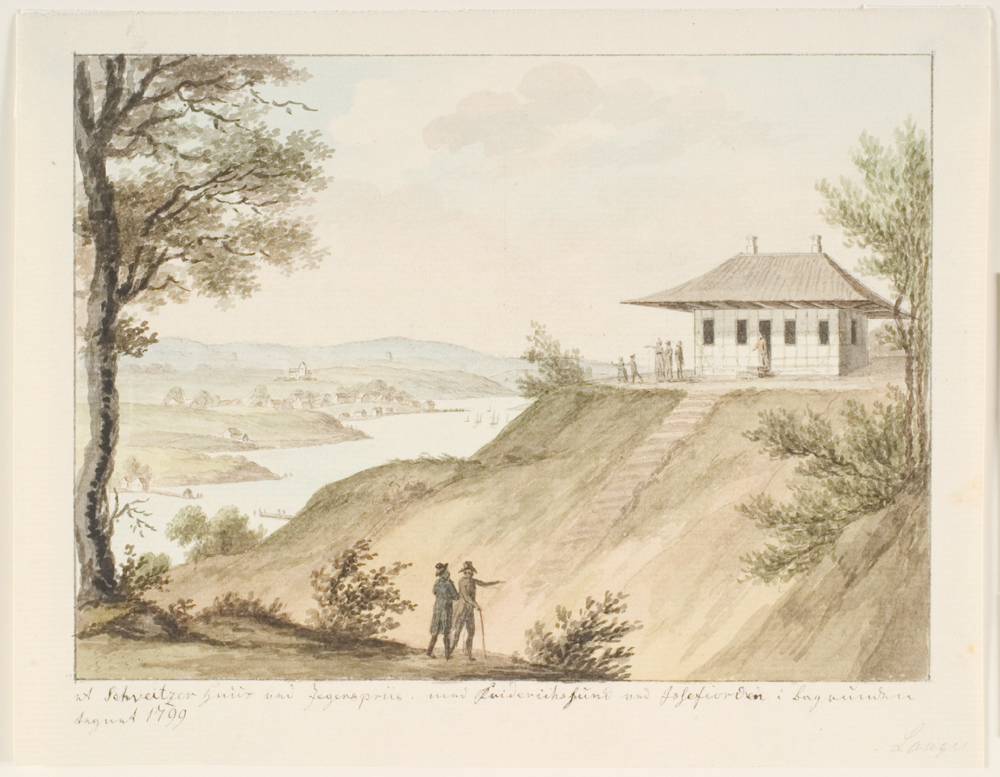
The Swiss House in Frederiksberg Park, 1799

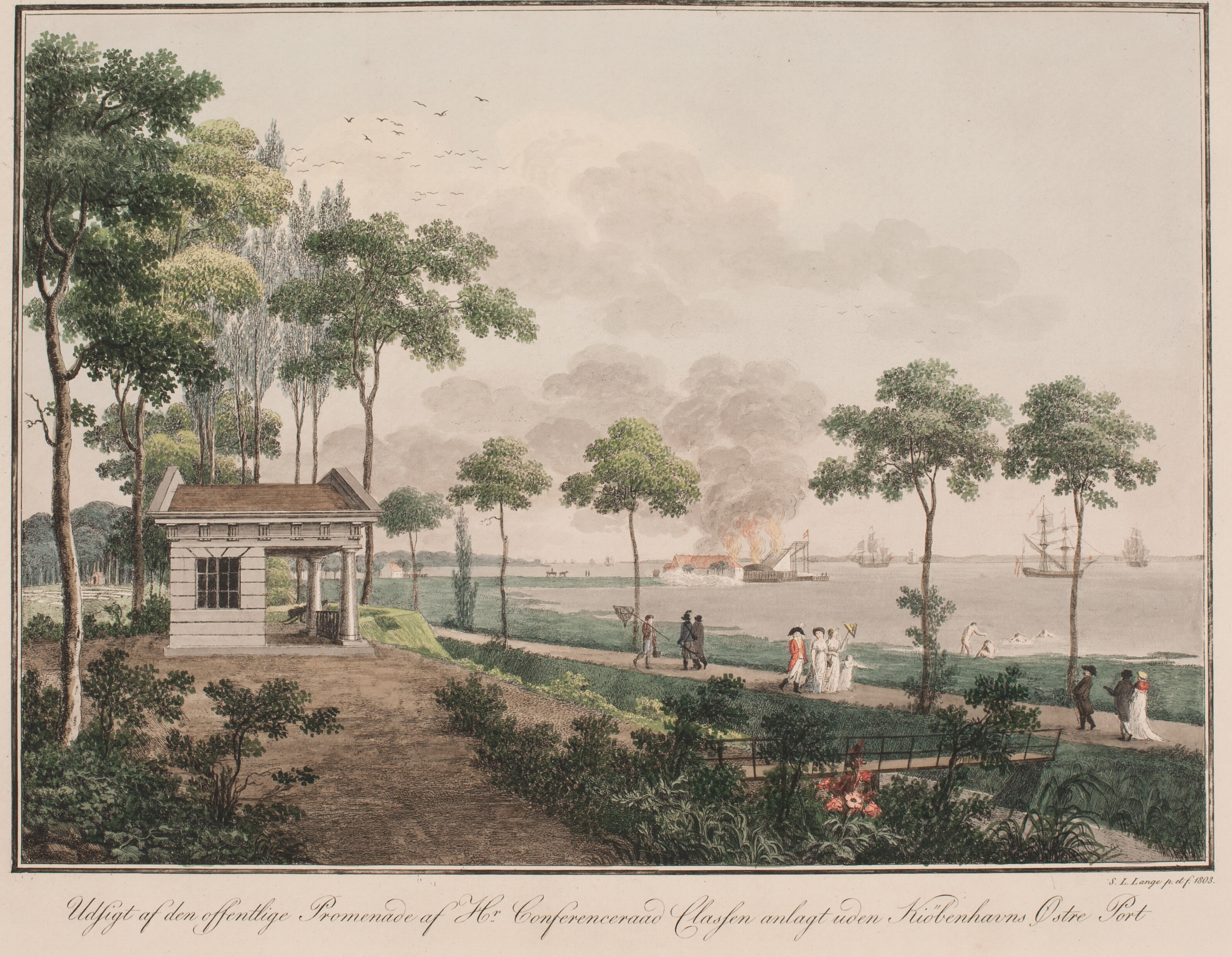
Classen's Garden in Østerbro outside Copenhagen, 1803

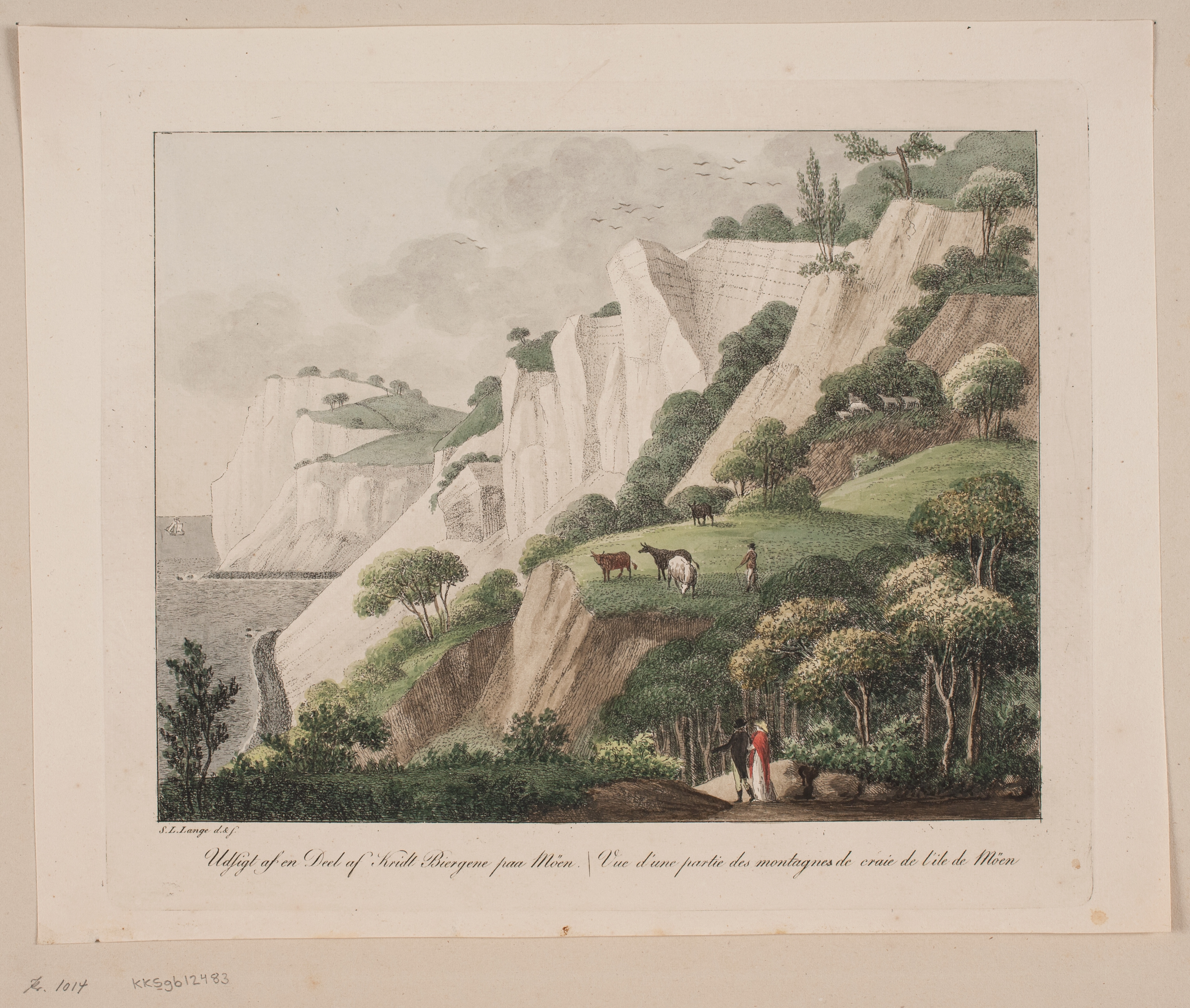
Møns Klint, 1803

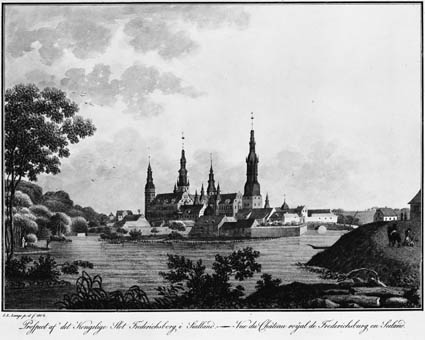
Frederiksberg Palace, 1804

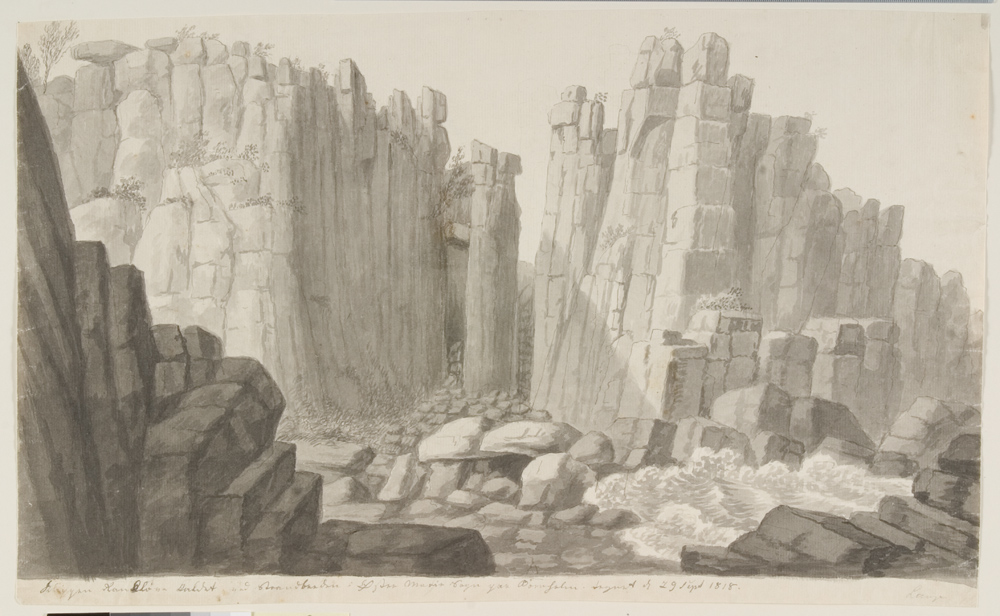
Randkløv på Bornholm, 1818

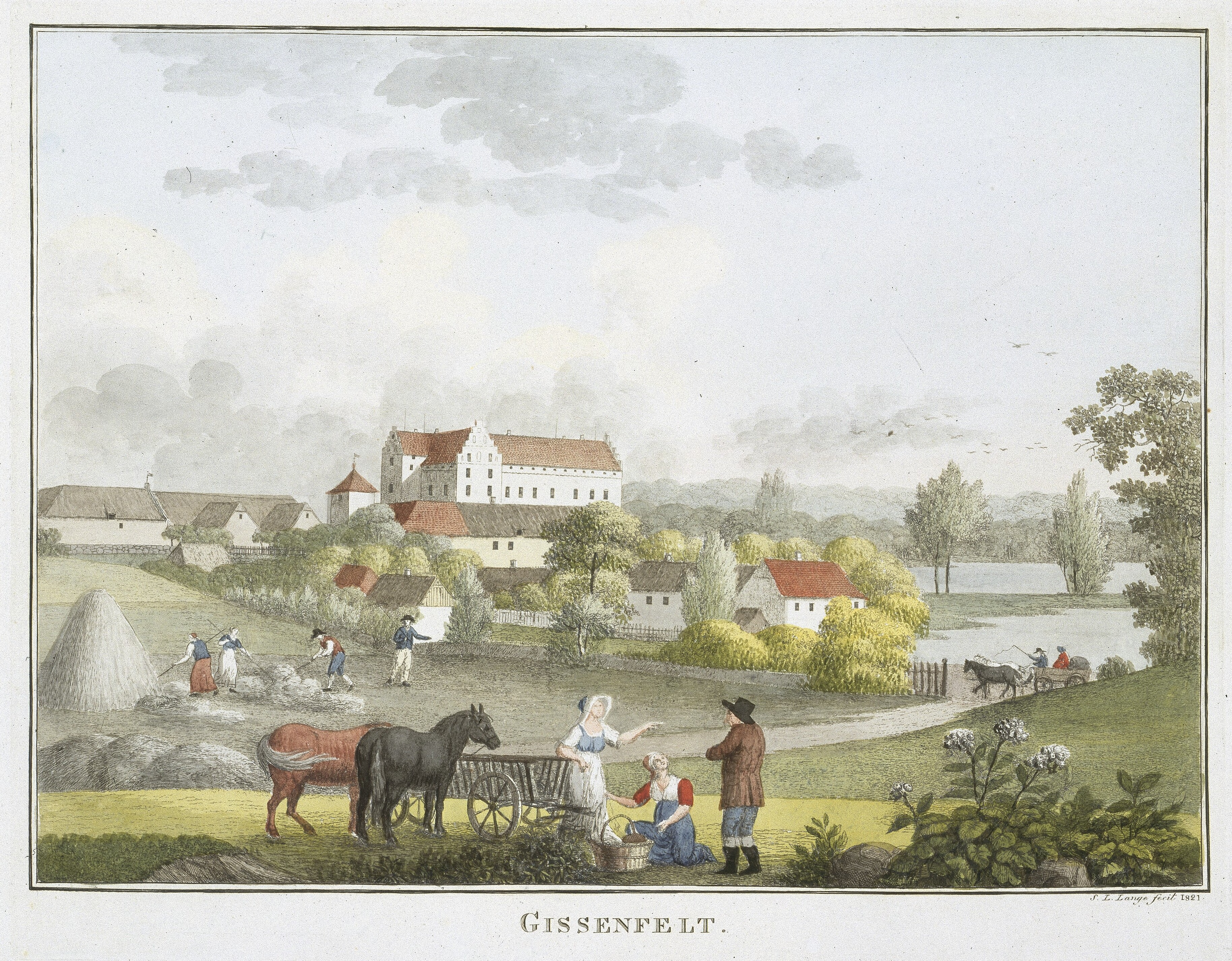
Gisselfeld, 1821

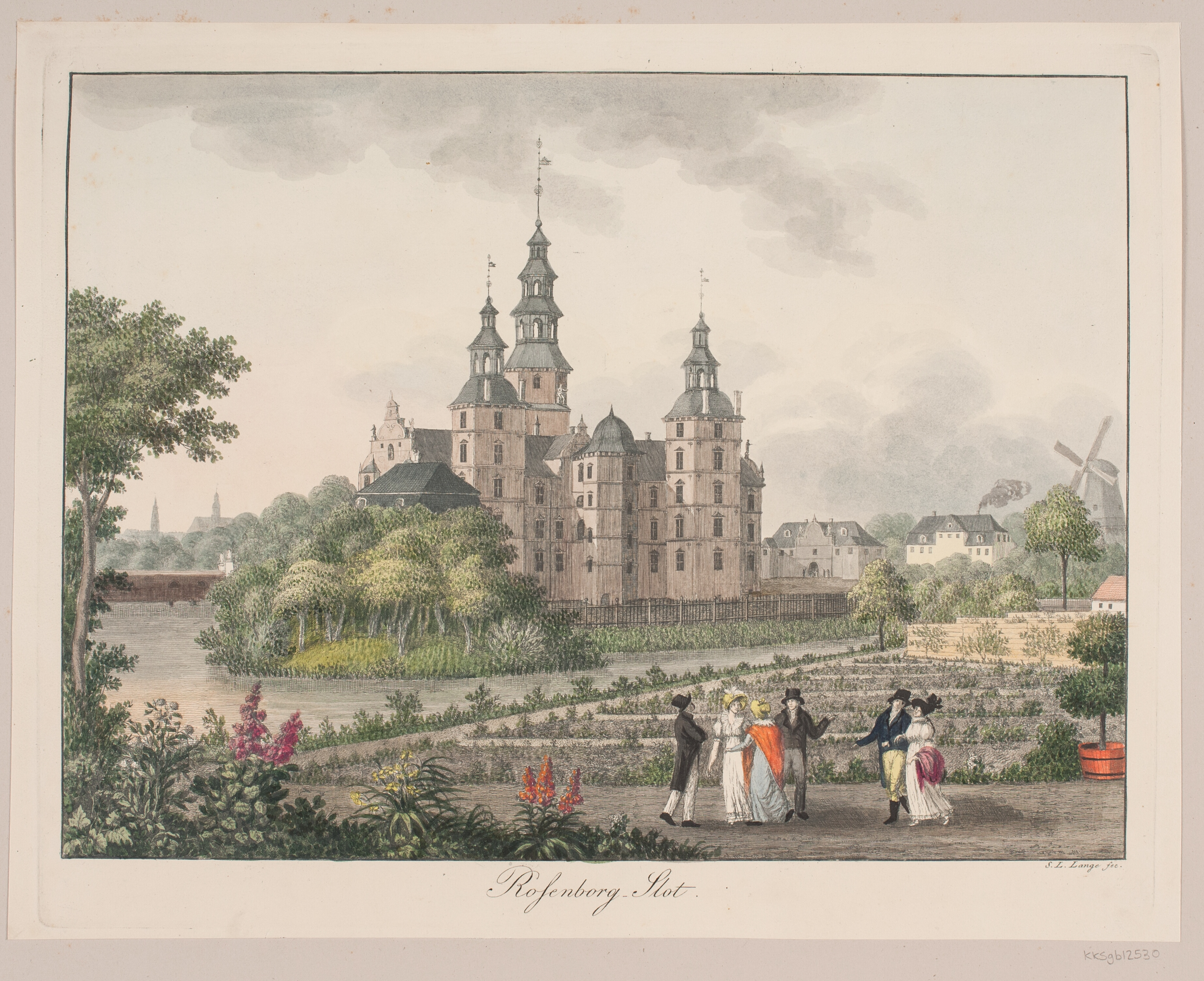
Rosenborg Castle, printed in 1887
