= Giesegaard =

Manor house and estate in Ringsted Municipality, Denmark

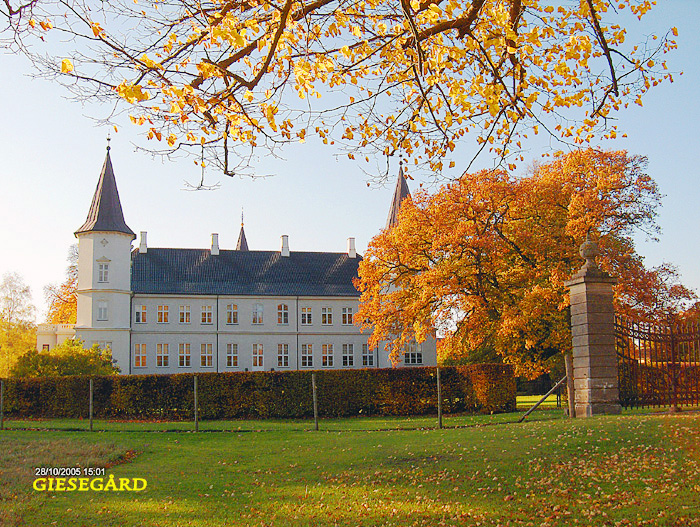
- Vintage photo of the main building
- Interactive map of the Giesegaard area

General information
- Architectural style: Historicism
- Location: Ringsted Municipality, Denmark
- Coordinates: 55°25′3.19″N 11°56′11.09″E
- Construction started: 1750
- Renovated: 1873, 1904
- Owner: Michael Brockenhuus-Schack

Giesegaard is a manor house and estate located in Ringsted Municipality, Denmark. The estate has been owned by members of the Schack/Brockenhuus-Schack family since 1736 and is currently owned by Michael Brockenhuus-Schack.

The oldest part of the main building was constructed in 1751 for Countess Anna Sophie Schack. It was expanded with an additional storey in 1847 and underwent further renovations in 1873 and 1904. The manor now appears as a two-story, white-plastered building featuring two octagonal towers and black-glazed tile roofs.

The estate covers 3,115 hectares of land.

== History ==
=== Giese family, 1668–1719 ===
A village named Skivede was located on the site where Giesegaard stands today until the 1670s. The land belonged to the Crown until 1668, when Frederick IV ceded it to Frederik Giese in exchange for land elsewhere. Giese, originally from Husum, acquired additional land in the area before establishing the manor of Giesegaard in 1683.

After his death in 1693, Giesegaard was inherited by his widow, Margrethe Elisabeth Schönbach, and their son, Christoffer Joachim Giese.

=== Scavenius and Gabel, 1719–1736 ===
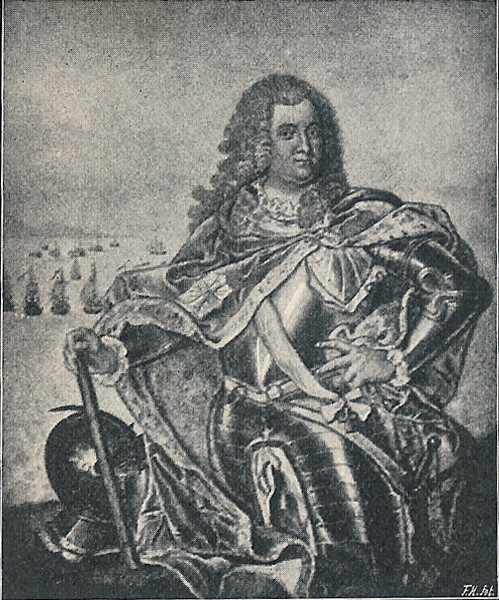
Christian Carl Gabel

Christoffer Joachim Giese died in 1719, and his mother was forced to cede the estate to her creditor, Christian Scavenius. In 1720, Scavenius sold Giesegaard to Christian Carl Gabel, who had been appointed Chief Secretary of War (overkrigssekretær). Gabel expanded the estate significantly by acquiring additional land.

However, in 1723, he fell out of favor at court and was dismissed from his position. Facing financial difficulties, he was forced to take a loan from Countess Anna Sophie Schack in 1726—the same year he was appointed diocesan governor of Ribe County.

=== Schack family, 1736–present ===
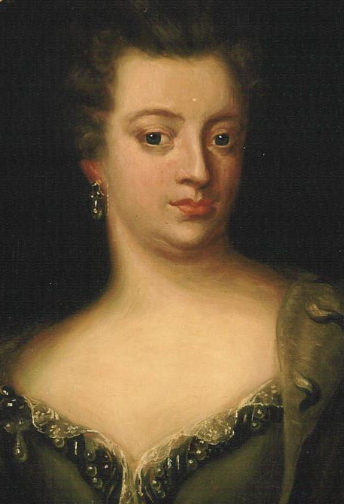
Anna Sophie Schack

In 1736, Anna Sophie Schack took over Giesegaard after Christian Carl Gabel was unable to repay his debts. In her will, she established Stamhuset Giesegaard, ensuring that the estate could not be sold or divided among heirs. However, due to heavy mortgages, Stamhuset Giesegaard was not officially established until 1766.

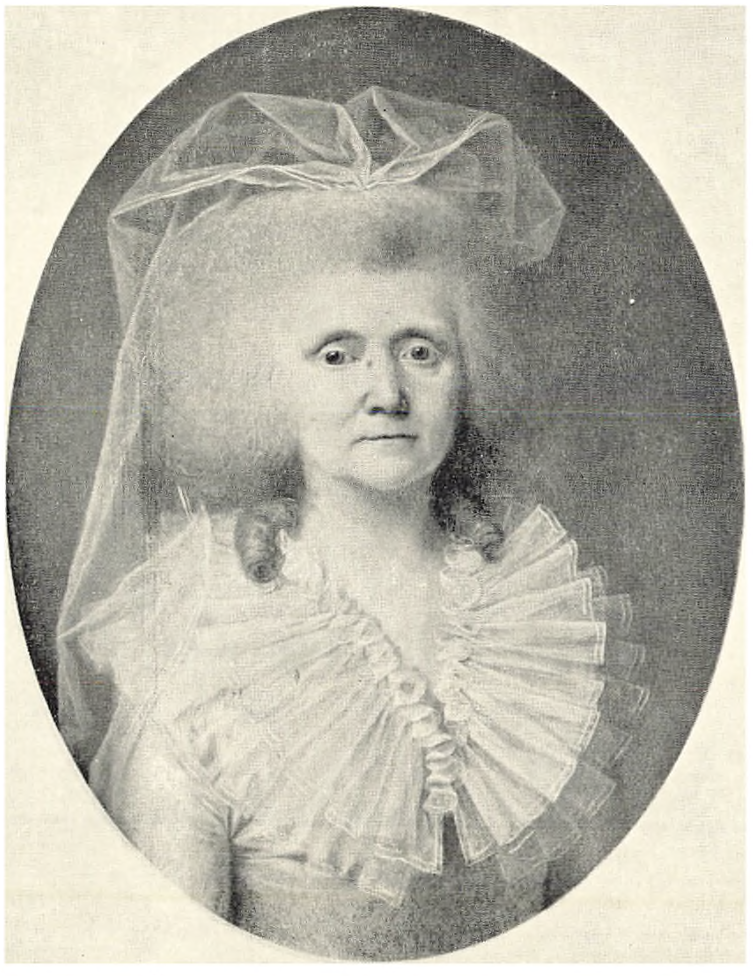
Ida Skeel, countess Schack, née Bille.

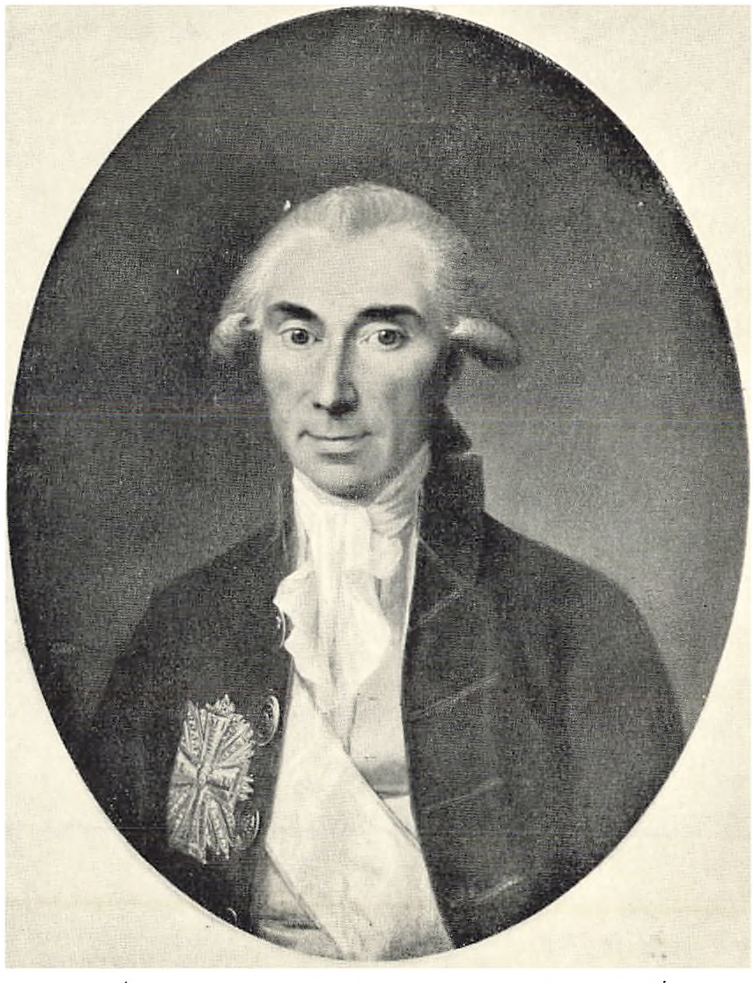
Frederik Christian, count Schack til Stamhuset Giesegaard.

Christian Frederik Schack, the son of Otto Didrik Schack and Anna Ernestine Frederikke (née Gabel), inherited the estate in 1760. In 1790, Knud Bille Schack became the new owner of Stamhuset Giesegaard. He died during a journey to Karlsruhe in 1821, after which the estate was inherited by his nephew, Henrik Adolph Brockenhuus-Schack, who was granted the title of count the following year.

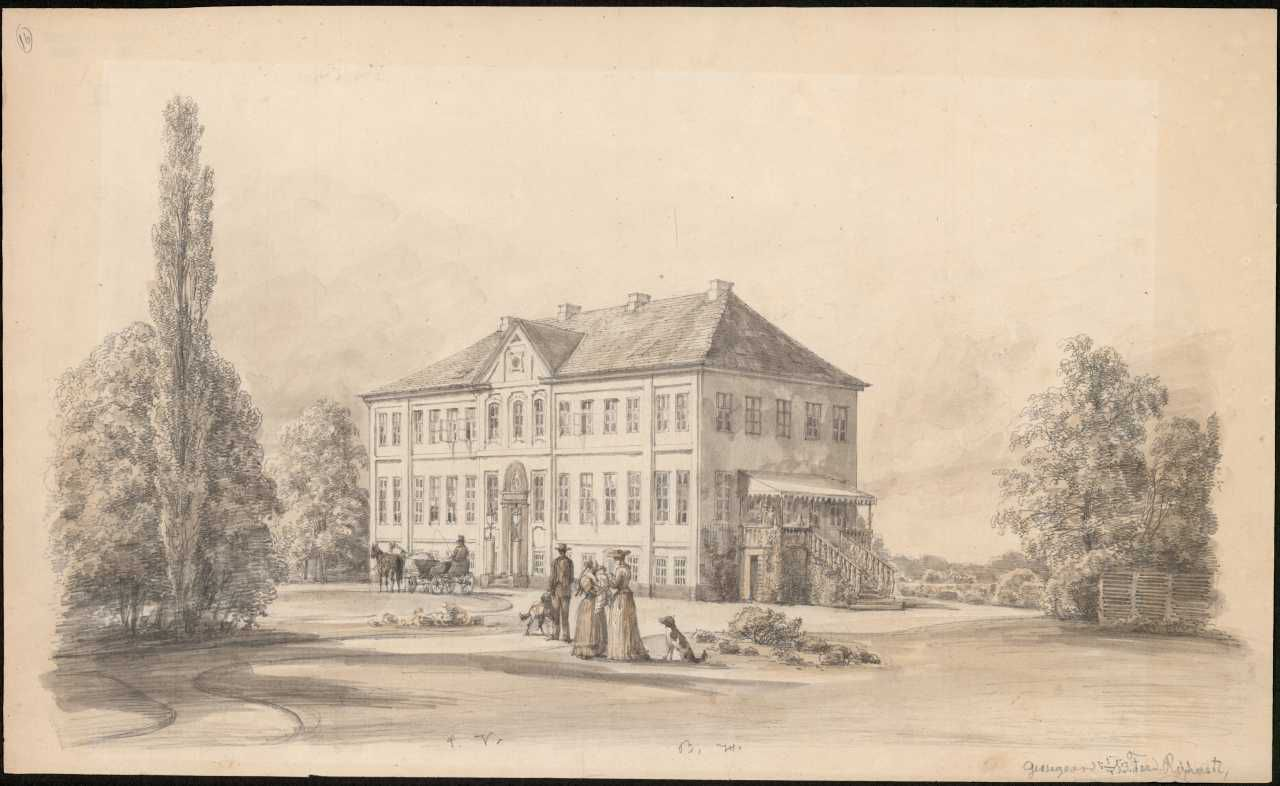
Giesegaard in a drawing by Ferdinand Richardt from 1853

Henrik Adolph Brockenhuus-Schack’s son, Knud Bille Brockenhuus-Schack, inherited Giesegaard in 1847. In 1892, his son, Adolph Ludvig Brockenhuus-Schack, became the owner of the estate.

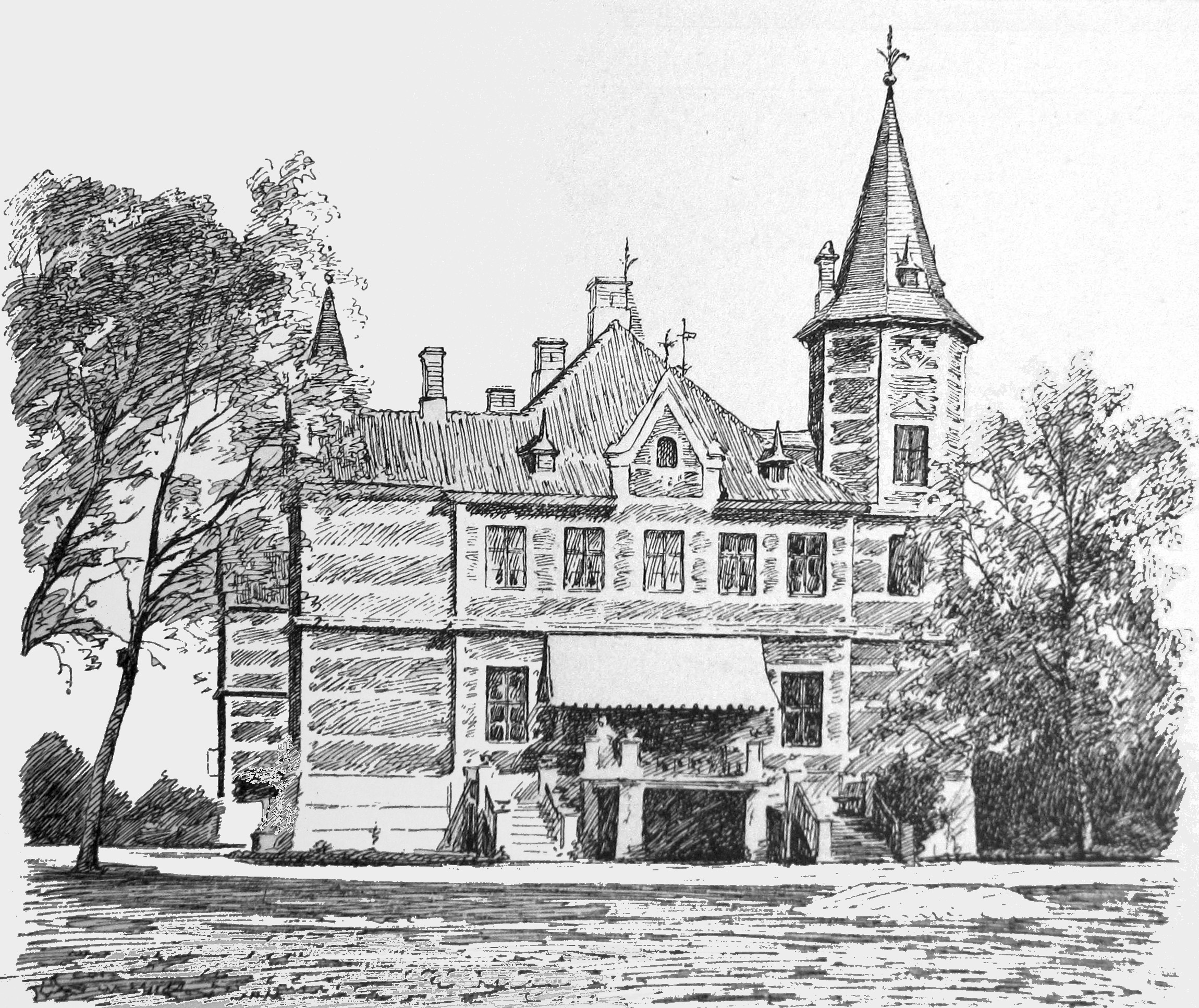
Giesegaard after the 1873 renovation

Stamhuset Giesegaard was dissolved in 1922 following the lensafløsningloven of 1919. As a result, large portions of land were ceded to the state and divided into smallholdings. In 1924, Frederik Knud Bille Brockenhuus-Schack inherited the remaining part of the estate.

== Architecture ==
A one-story main building was constructed for Countess Anna Sophie Schack between 1750 and 1751. In 1843, it was extended with an additional story. Both facades feature a triangular pediment.

In 1873, the building was remodeled in the Renaissance Revival style by Theodor Zeltner. As part of this adaptation, he added two copper-clad towers, altered the roof structure, and incorporated sandstone decorations.

In 1904, the building underwent restoration under the supervision of architect G. Tvede. During this renovation, most of the decorative elements were removed, and the walls were clad for a more refined appearance. Most of the associated farm buildings date from 1902.

== Today ==
Giesegaard covers 3,115 hectares, of which 1,013 hectares are farmland and 1,499 hectares are woodland. In April 2017, DR estimated the estate's value at DKK 330 million.

== Cultural references ==
Giesegaard has been used as a filming location for several feature films, including Komtessen (1961), Mazurka på sengekanten (Bedroom Mazurka, 1970), Rektor på sengekanten (1972), and Pigen og drømmeslottet(1974).

== List of owners ==
- (1668–1693) Frederik Giese
- (1693–1719) Margretha Elisabeth Giese née Schönbach
- (1693–1719) Christoffer Joachim Giese
- (1719–1720) Christian Scavenius
- (1720–1736) Christian Carl Gabel
- (1736–1760) Anna Sophie Schack née Rantzau
- (1760–1790) Frederik Christian Schack
- (1790–1821) Knud Bille Schack
- (1821–1847) Henrik Adolph Brockenhuus-Schack
- (1847–1892) Knud Bille Brockenhuus-Schack
- (1892–1924) Adolph Ludvig Brockenhuus-Schack
- (1924–unknown) Frederik Knud Brockenhuus-Schack
- (unknown) Niels Brockenhuus-Schack
- (1999–present) Michael Brockenhuus-Schack
