= Dorothea Krag =

Danish noble (1675–1754)

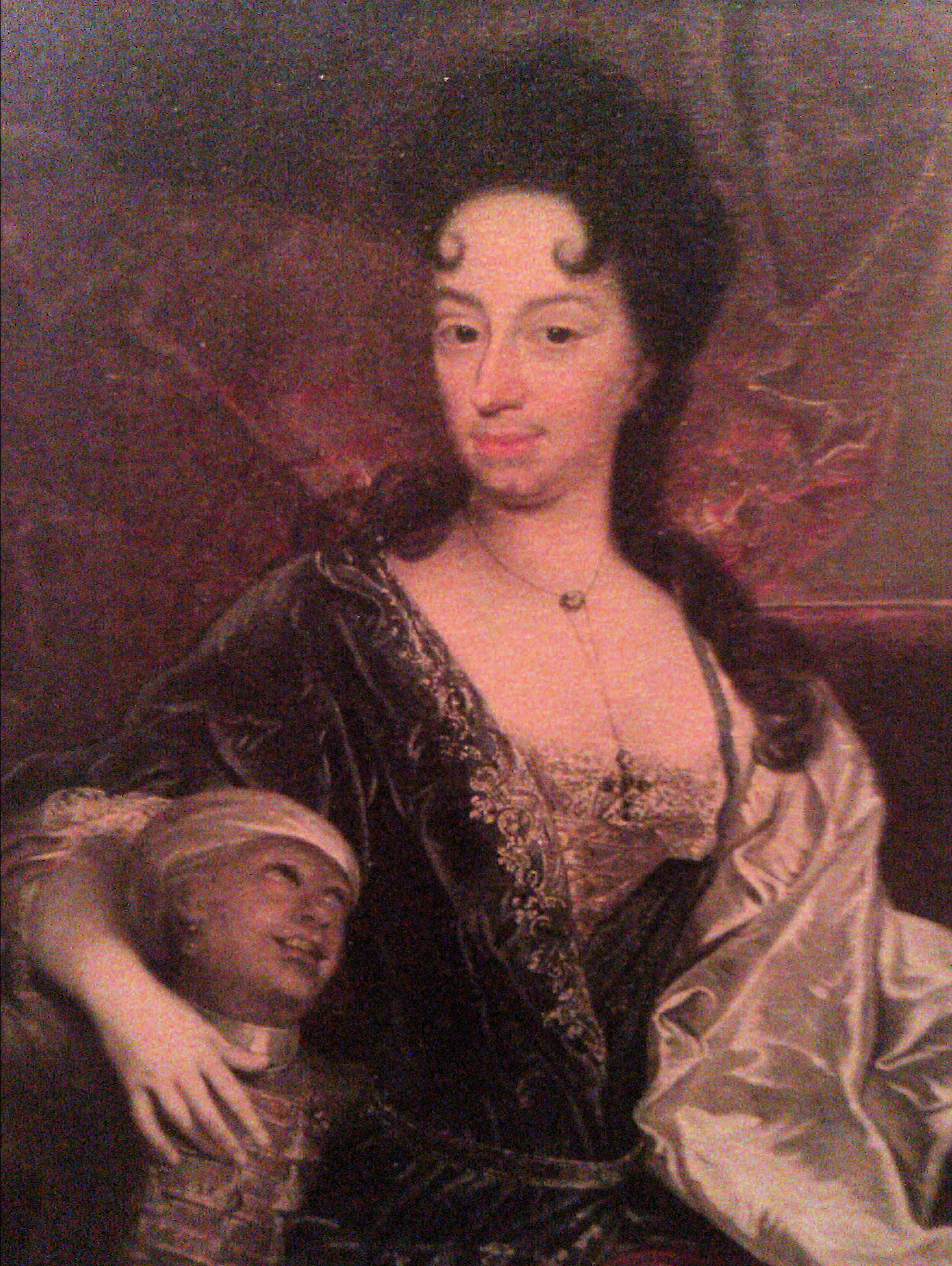
- Portrait of Krag by Benoît Le Coffre, c. 1700

Danish Postmaster General
- In office 22 September 1703 – 3 December 1711
- Monarch: Frederick IV
- Preceded by: Christian Gyldenløve
- Succeeded by: Claus Henrik Vieregg

Personal details
- Born: 27 September 1675
- Died: 10 October 1754 (aged 79) Gisselfeld, Denmark
- Resting place: Eckernförde, Duchy of Schleswig
- Spouses: Jens Juel (m. 1694; died 1700) Christian Gyldenløve (m. 1701; died 1703) Hans Adolph Ahlefeldt (m. 1715)
- Children: Christian Danneskiold-Samsøe (1702–1728); Frederik Danneskiold-Samsøe (1703–1770); Anna Joachimine Ahlefeldt (1717–1795)

Dorothea Krag (27 September 1675 – 10 October 1754) was a Danish noblewoman and the Postmaster General from 1703 to 1711. She was the first woman to hold the position in Denmark.

Through her second husband, Christian Gyldenløve, Krag inherited the office of Postmaster General. This was expected to be a purely ceremonial position, however she elected to manage to Danish Postal Service, which was unique for a woman of her time and the first in Denmark. As Postmaster General, she reformed the role of postmasters in 1705 and introduced uniforms and post horns in 1709.

Krag's success as Postmaster General was contrasted by her failures as a businesswoman. The debts she had inherited from her second husband continued to mount after his death. Under her ownership, the estate of Gisselfeld nearly fell into bankruptcy. It was not until after her death that their heir was able to realise her and Gyldenløve's intentions for the property.

== Biography ==
Dorothea Krag was born on 27 September 1675 to Mogens Krag and Helvig von der Kuhla (d. 1676). Her father had been well-liked at court and secured her marriage to Jens Juel, one of the most powerful statesmen in Denmark at the time. She and Juel were married on 11 April 1694; he was 63 years-old.

Through her marriage to Jens Juel, Krag profited from the Atlantic slave trade. Juel had been one of the founders of the Danish West India Company. While staying at Kongens Nytorv in Copenhagen, she had a portrait commissioned from Benoît Le Coffre circa 1700. The portrait shows her seated in her mansion with her arm around an African child who wears a metal ring around their neck.

=== Marriage to Gyldenløve ===
Exactly a year after Juel's death in 1700, Krag married Christian Gyldenløve on 25 May 1701. As King Frederick IV's half-brother and the count of Danneskiold-Samsøe, he had substantial power in Denmark. While he was commanding Danish auxilary troops in Italy, Krag likely traveled with him. This was not uncommon at the time for wives of high ranking military officers. While in Verona in 1702, their son Christian Danneskiold-Samsøe was born. While there, the couple made a will through which Gyldenløve's estate, Gisselfeld, was to be transformed into an abbey after their deaths. The idea likely came from Krag and was inspired by Roskilde Adelige Jomfrukloster, which had been established, in part, by her former sister-in-law.

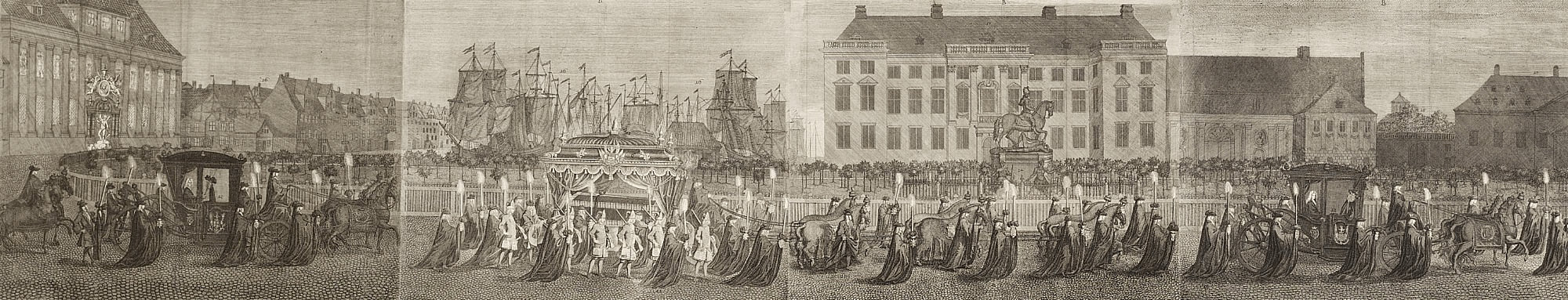
Engraving of Christian Gyldenløve's funeral procession passing by Kongens Nytorv

The couple returned to Copenhagen in late 1702. Gyldenløve died in July 1703. Their second son, Frederik Danneskiold-Samsøe, was born four months later. From her late husband, she inherited the office of Postmaster General, the Gisselfeld estate, and his property in Copenhagen at Kongens Nytorv. The Copenhagen property had belonged to his mother, Sophie Amalie Moth, and would later become known as Thotts Palæ. While working as the Postmaster General, Krag primarily lived at Thotts Palæ.

In addition to Gyldenløve's office and properties, Krag inherited his debts. Gyldenløve had furnished Gisselfeld at great expense before their marriage and subsequently expanded the Thotts Palæ property as well. Having failed to pay interest on his loans, she was forced to sell off parts of Gisselfeld and to take out new loans.

=== Life at Gisselfeld ===
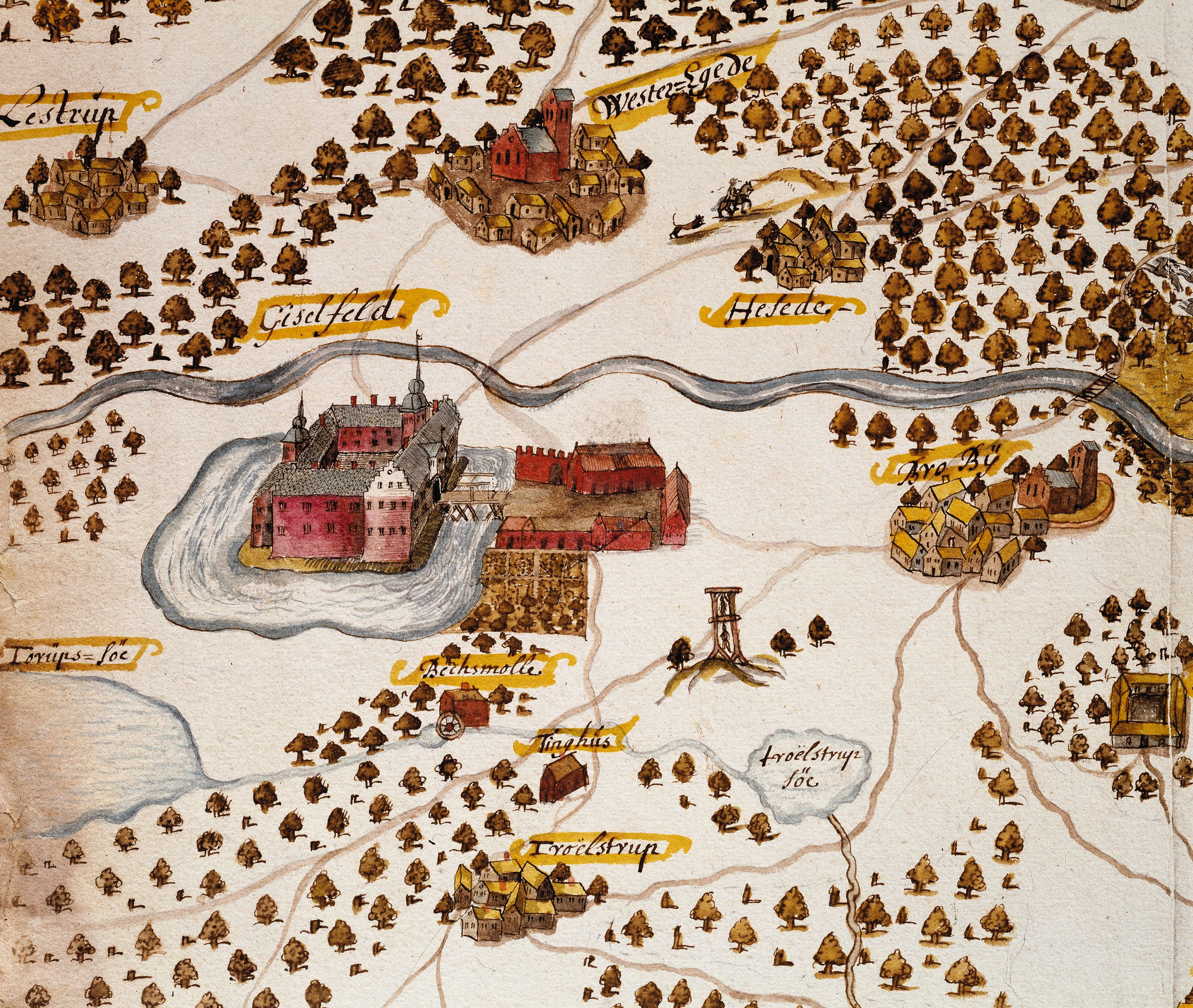
Map of Gisselfeld, c. 1670

On 1 June 1715, she married Hans Adolph Ahlefeldt at Gisselfeld. King Frederick IV disapproved of the marriage; she was previously married to the king's half-brother and Ahlefeldt's status as a low-ranking member of the nobility meant that they were of very unequal status. She and Ahlefeldt had a daughter in 1717 named Anna Joachimine Ahlefeldt.

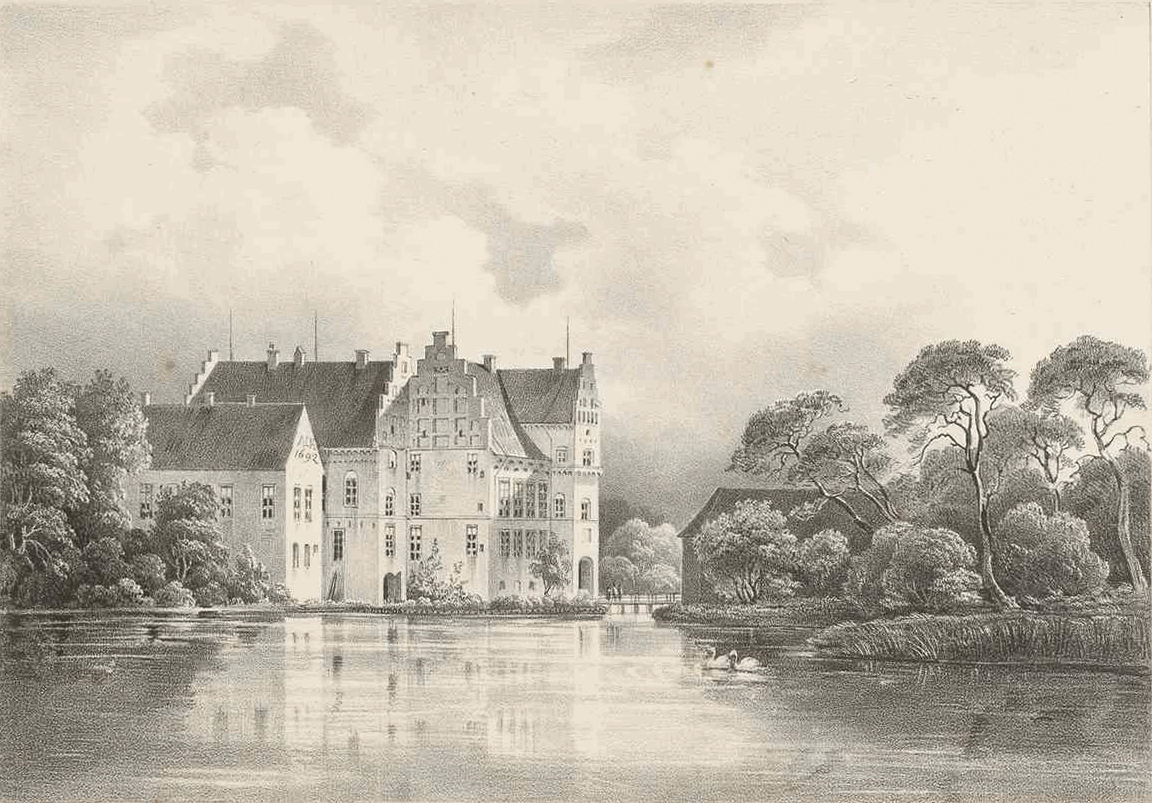
Illustration of Gisseldfeld in the early 19th century by Ferdinand Richardt

During their marriage, Ahlefeldt took over management of Gisselfeld. Krag and Ahlefeldt are said to have had a "superfluous" and "lavish" lifestyle that came at great expense. Meanwhile, Krag was receiving less money from the crown. Until her children with Gyldenløve came of age, she received an annual pension of 4,000 Danish rigsdaler. In 1729, the king halved her pension to 2,000 rigsdaler, before terminating the payments altogether in 1732. With no income, Krag and Ahlefeldt's poor financial choices and lack of business insight drove the couple further into debt and nearly brought the estate to bankruptcy.

Dorothea Krag died on 10 October 1754 at Gisselfeld and was buried in Eckernförde. Because her eldest son had died in 1728, the properties she inherited from Gyldenløve were then given to her grandson, Frederik Christian Danneskiold-Samsøe. Given his grandparent's debts, he was faced with the difficult task of realising the requirements of their will. By 1755, however, he had managed to establish an Abbey, as Krag and Gyldenløve had wished.

== Postmaster General ==
Her second husband, Christian Gyldenløve, had been granted the office of Postmaster General in 1686. By royal agreement, he was to hold the post until 1711, when he would instead be offered an annual pension. To Gyldenløve, the office was little more than a ceremonial form of income; he had left the board of directors to be managed by a postmaster.

=== Securing the office ===
When Christian Gyldenløve died in 1703, King Frederik IV used the opportunity to reacquire the postal service for the crown. He issued a royal decree on 22 September 1703 which claimed the income of the service for the state. The decree stipulated that the king would act as guardian of the service until his death, after which it would pass to Gyldenløve's heir. However, Krag argued that her marriage contract required that she manage Gyldenløve's property on behalf of their children, so long as she did not remarry. She successfully negotiated with the king and was permitted to run the office on behalf of her children until 1711.

Given that the role had been largely ceremonial, she was granted the post primarily as a form of income. According to Krag, part of the reason the king had granted her the post, was so that she could use its salary to pay off her late husband's debts. From the king's perspective, she was merely to hold the post until an heir of Gyldenløve's was able to inherit it himself. On 22 September 1703, she was formally granted the office of Postmaster General, along with its salary. This was under the condition that she surrender the post in 1711, as had been the agreement with Gyldenløve, with the intent being that her eldest son could take over the office when he was old enough.

=== Hendes høje Naade ===
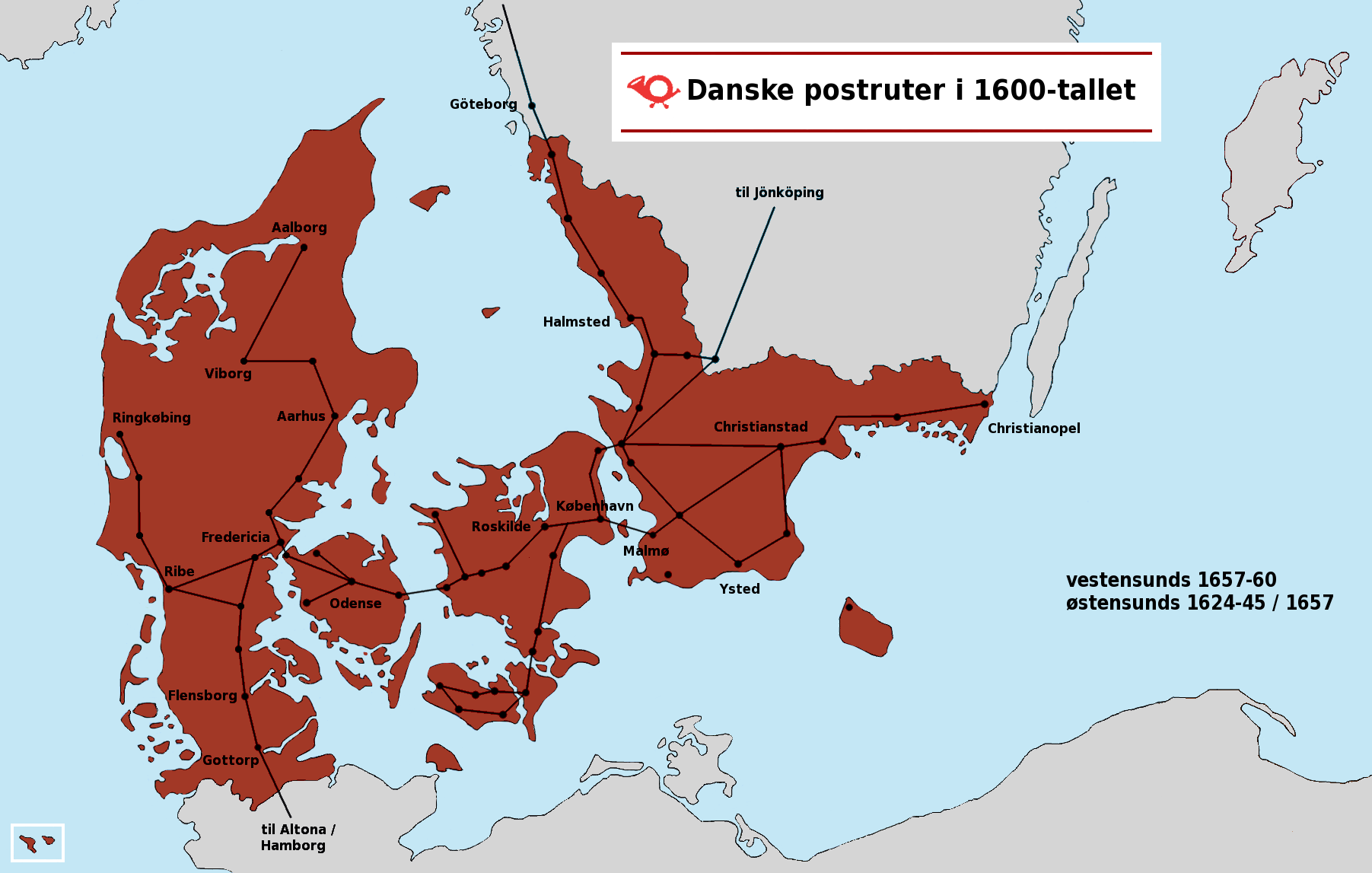
Map of the postal routes of Denmark in the 17th century showing the extent of the postal service's reach

On 8 October 1703, she hired Christoph Joachim Giese, who was a deputy in the Generalkrigskommissariatet. Giese was given the title Chefpostmester (transl. Executive Postmaster). His job title, as executive of the postal service, implies that he was to have full administrative control of the service and to receive a share of its income. Within a matter of months, however, Krag began to interfere with Giese's autonomy. In time, his role shifted to that of a spokesman. Krag took over direct management of the Danish Postal Service. To those within the postal service, she was known as Hendes høje Naade (lit. 'Her High Grace').

During her tenure as Postmaster General, Krag made efforts to make the service more profitable and to modernise it against growing foreign competition. After her proposal to establish a commission to revise the postal regulations failed, she circumvented the process by issuing her own detailed instructions for postmasters in 1705. In 1709, she introduced the use of post horns. She also introduced a new uniform for postal workers that included a cloak and cap in red and yellow: the colours of the House of Oldenburg.

Gisse was dismissed unceremoniously from his role as Chefpostmester in 1706, after which Krag elected not to hire a replacement to run the postal service on her behalf. instead, she relied on two postal administrators in Copenhagen to assist her. She remained in charge of the service as a whole, signing orders, negotiating contracts for transportation, and coordinating the kingdom's postmasters.

Krag had agreed to hand over control of the postal service on 24 September 1711. However, Copenhagen was ravaged by the Great Northern War plague outbreak at the time. The king had fled to Pomerania and the council which oversaw matters in his absence had moved out of the city to Jægersborg. The end of her tenure, therefore, was not noticed by the state and Krag continued to manage the postal service. No formal plan had been prepared on how the service would be run once she left, given that her eldest son was not yet old enough to take charge of it himself. It wasn't until October 1711 that Krag received an order to hand over the postal service to the state, which had made abrupt plans for it to be overseen by Claus Henrik Vieregg and Frederik Giedde. She did not ceed control until 3 December, having been repeatedly urged to comply with the king's order.

== Legacy ==
When Krag left the office of Postmaster General in 1711, the service was more profitable and efficient that it had ever been under her late husband's tenure. Until the 1990s, historians commonly implied that her interest in improving the postal service was merely motivated by personal gain. They often cited her personal clothing expenses, mounting debts, and alleged personal distaste for the office. Since the 1990s, her time as Postmaster General has instead been seen as tenacious and well-led in its own right.

Dorothea Krag's children

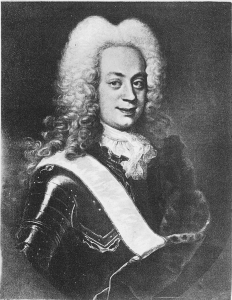
Christian Danneskiold-Samsøe (1702–1728)

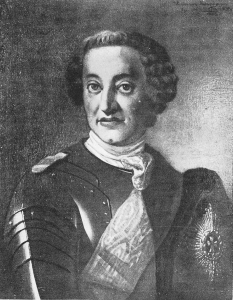
Frederik Danneskiold-Samsøe (1703–1770)

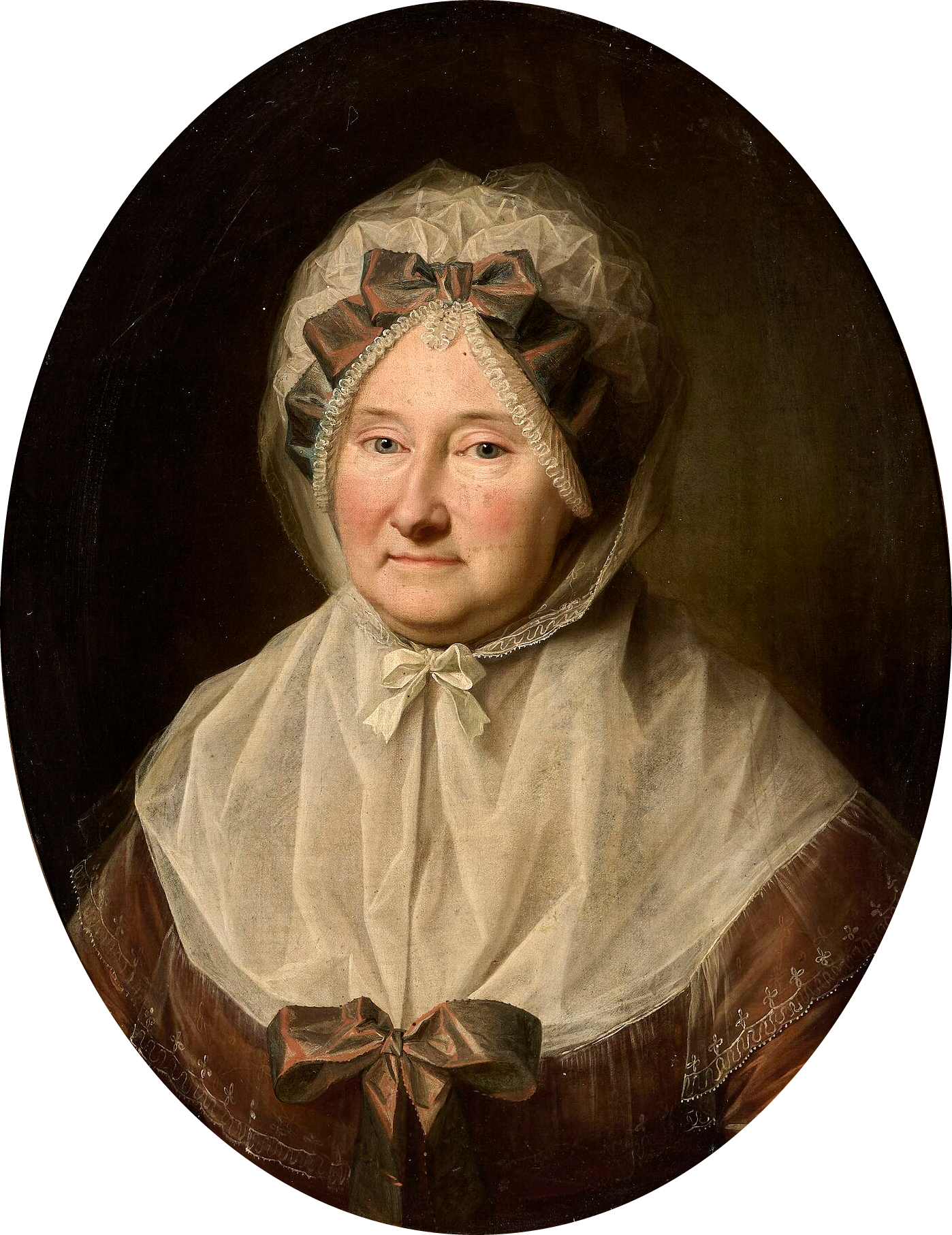
Anna Joachimine Ahlefeldt (1717–1795)

== See also ==
- Katharina Henot
- Hedevig Johanne Bagger
