= Tunbyholm Castle =

Building in Tomelilla Municipality, Scania, Sweden

- Tunbyholms slott
- Tomelilla Municipality
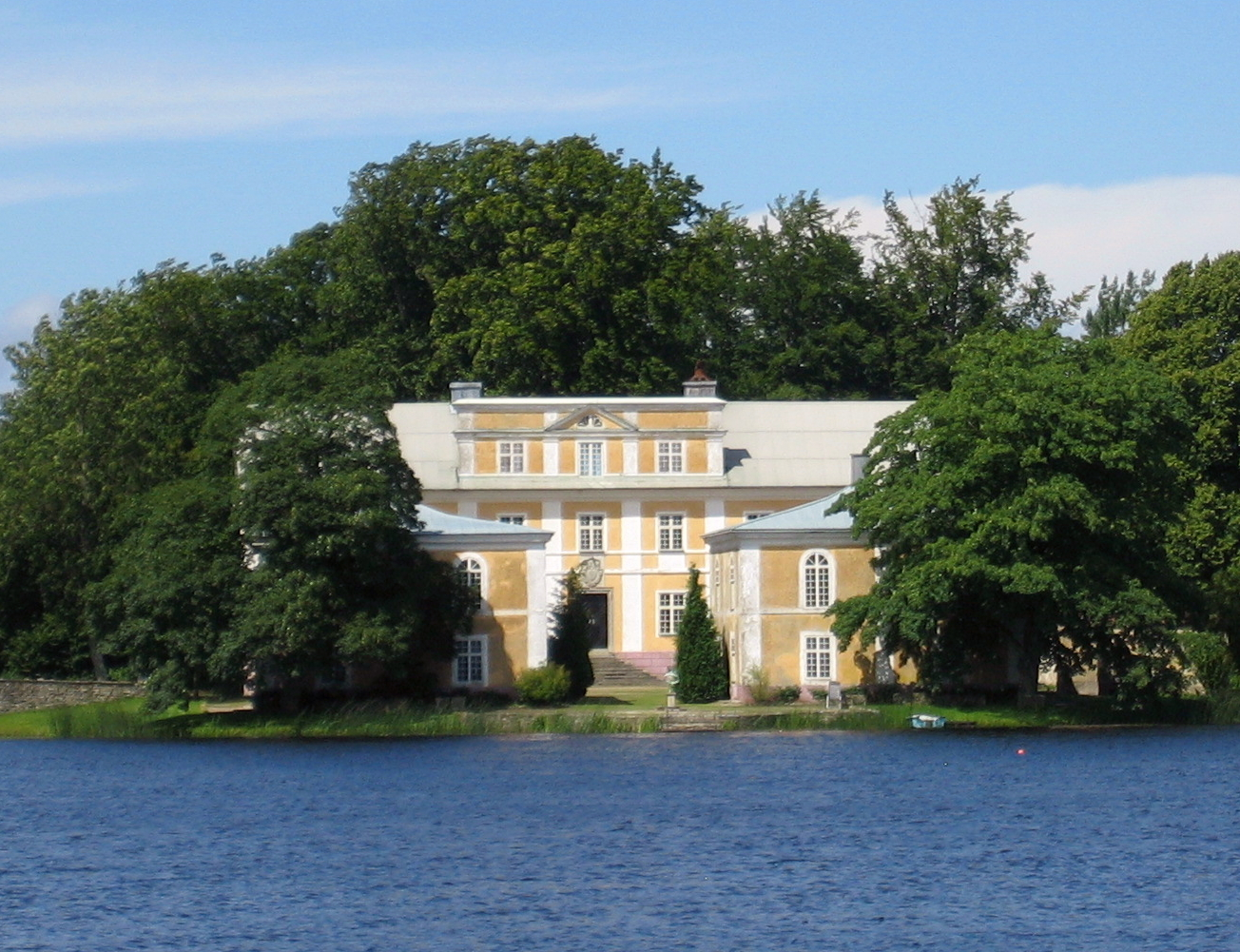
- Tunbyholm Castle

Site information
- Type: Castle
- Open to the public: No

Location
- Scania, Sweden
- Location within Skåne
- Coordinates: 55.597778°N 14.123333°E

Site history
- Built: 1634-40s

Tunbyholm Castle (Swedish: Tunbyholms slott) is a manor house at Tomelilla Municipality in Scania, Sweden.

The facility consists of a two-story building with yellow facades, white pilasters and window surrounds as well as two free-standing wings with square floors, flat saddle roof and pediment-crowned central section. The present appearance is the result of a classic restoration in the 1830s.

== See also ==
- List of castles in Sweden
