= 1774 in Denmark =

- Decades: 1750s; 1760s; 1770s; 1780s; 1790s
- See also: Other events of 1774; List of years in Denmark

Events from the year 1774 in Denmark.

== Incumbents ==
- Monarch – Christian VII
- Prime minister – Ove Høegh-Guldberg

== Events ==
January

- 31 January – The Royal Danish Theatre reopens on Kongens Nytorv in Copenhagen..

September

- 26 Seåtember – Vordingborg Cacalry District is divided into 12 manors and sold at auction.
  - Iselingen, Rosenfeldt, Snertinge and Avnø (32,000 rigsdaler) were sold to Reinhard Iselin.
  - Øbjerggaard are sold for 30,050 rigsdaler to Niels Ruberg-.
  - Lundbygård is sold for 34,000 rigsdaler to Casper Wilhelm von Munthe af Morgenstierne.
  - Skovbygård is sold for 30,120 rigsdaler to Hans Pedersen.
  - Beldringe (48 000 rigsdaler) and Lekkende (40,000 rigsdaler) are sold to Frederik Sophus Raben.
  - Kallehavegaard is sold to Peter Johansen.

November

- 27 November – The Order of the Chain is founded in Copenhagen.

=== Undated ===
- The former Antvoeskov Cavalry District was divided into nine estates and sold by public auction.
  - Antvorskov
  - Valbygård was sold to general Joachim Melchior Holten Castenskiold of Borreby,
  - Frederikslund was sold to Hans Larsen Fogh.
  - Pebringegård was sold to Georg Ditlev Frederik Koës
  - Gyldenholm (two lots) was sold to Anders Dinesen.
  - Tårnborg was sold to Dyrehovedgård.
- The Barony of Holberg is established by Ludvig Holberg from the manors of Brorupgård and Tersløsegaard.

== Births ==
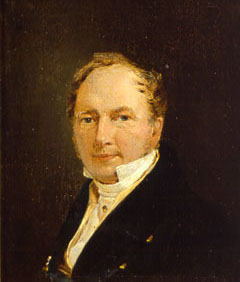
Christoph Ernst Friedrich Weyse.

- 7 February – Frederik Christian Kielsen, educator and publisher (died 1850)
- 5 March – Christoph Ernst Friedrich Weyse, composer (died 1842)
- 15 March – Salomon Soldin, publisher and writer (died 1837)
- 15 April – Sophie Thalbitzer, memorist (died 1851)
- 29 April – Christian Ludvig von Holten, governor in the Danish West Indies (died 1829)
- 11 June – Christian Conrad, Count of Danneskiold-Samsøe, councillor, board member, landowner and magistrate (died 1823)
- 17 August – Johannes Rehling colonial administrator (died 1841)
- 27 September – Bredo Henrik von Munthe af Morgenstierne Sr., jurist (died 1835)
- 26 November – Peter Frederik Wulff, naval officer (died 1842)
- 13 December – ≈Eline Heger, actress (died 1842)

== Deaths ==
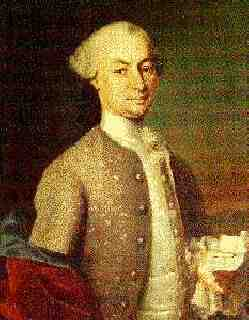
Peter Fenger.

- 13 August – Peter Applebye, industrialist (born 1709)
- 24 December – Peter Fenger (born 1719)
