= Marienlyst Manor =

Manor house in Zealand, Denmark

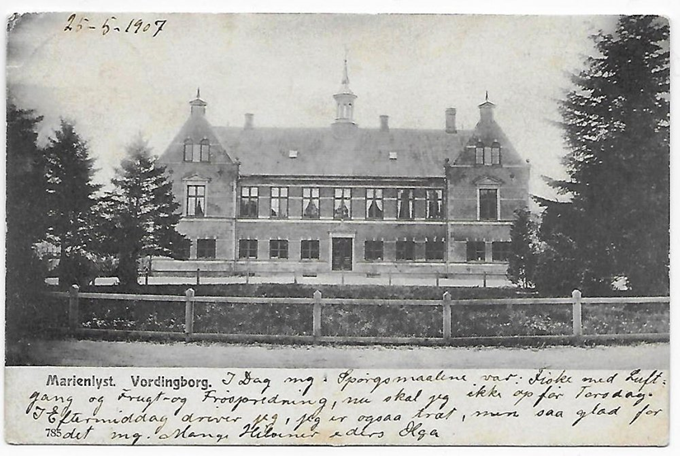
- Interactive map of the Marienlyst Manor area

General information
- Architectural style: Baroque
- Location: Marienlyst 1, 4760 Vordingborg, Denmark
- Coordinates: 55°00′6.02″N 11°55′43.66″E
- Completed: 1800
- Renovated: 1763

Marienlyst Manor is a manor house and estate located on the southernmost part of Zealand, overlooking the Færgestrøm, Vordingborg Municipality, in southeastern Denmark. Formerly a farm under Iselingen, it was incorporated as an independent manor in 1810. The main building dates from 1800 but owes its current appearance to a renovation undertaken after a fire in 1873.

== History ==
=== Reinhard and Marie Iselin ===
Marienlyst (lit. 'Marie's Joy') was created as a farm under Iselingenm owned by Reinhard Iselin. It was named for the elder of his two daughters, Marie Margrethe /Mini) (1753-1714). Iselin died in 1781. He was survived by his wife, Anne Elizabeth Iselin (née Fabritius), a daughter of Iselin's old employer Michael Fabritius. In accordance with his wishes, she established two estates (stamhuse) for their daughters in 1781, Iselingen and Rosenfeldt (named after the family's home town, Rosenfeld in Württemberg). Anna Elisabeth (née Fabritius) married Antoine de Bosc de la Calmette. On 14 June 1776, Marie (Mimi) Iselin had married to Christian Frederik Ernst, Count Rantzau. They were later divorced and went on to marry Charlotte Wilhelmine von Huth. Marie Iselin owned Iselingen from 1793 to 1803 and constructed the current main building in 1800.

=== New owners ===
In 1803, Iselingen was sold to brewer and former ship captain Jens Lind. In 1804, it was sold to first Hans Peter Reiersen and then to a consortium consisting of Peder Bech, Iver Qvistgaard, Hans Wassard (1756é1839) and Just Michael Aagaard. The partnership had also made other speculative investments on the property market- They had for instance bought part of the Bernstoff Mansion in Copenhagen.

=== Wassard fanuky ===
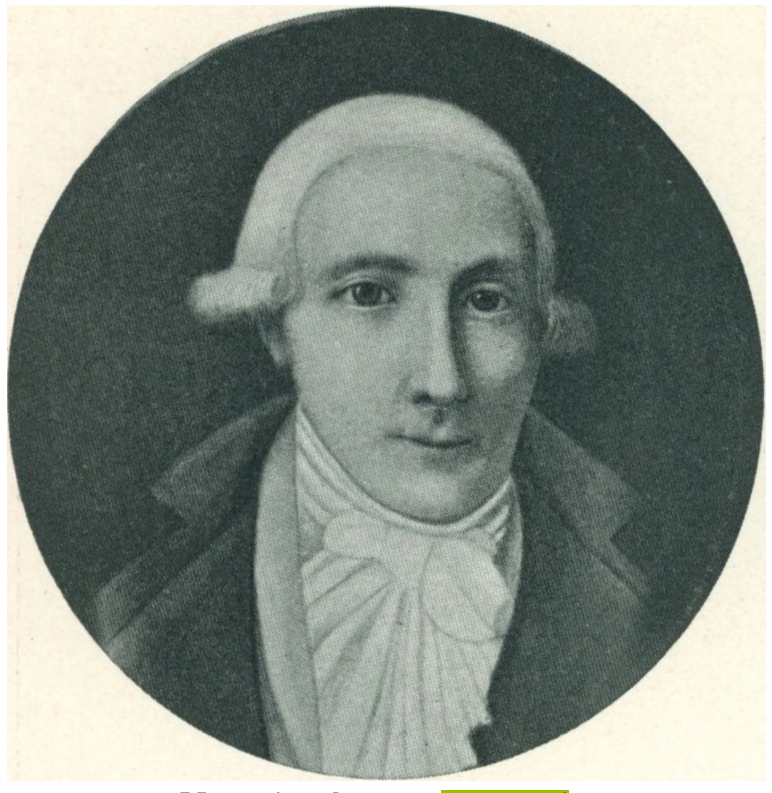
Hans Wassard

In 1810, Marienlyst was incorporated as an independent manor with Wassard as the sole owner while Aagaard continued as the sole owner of Iselingen.

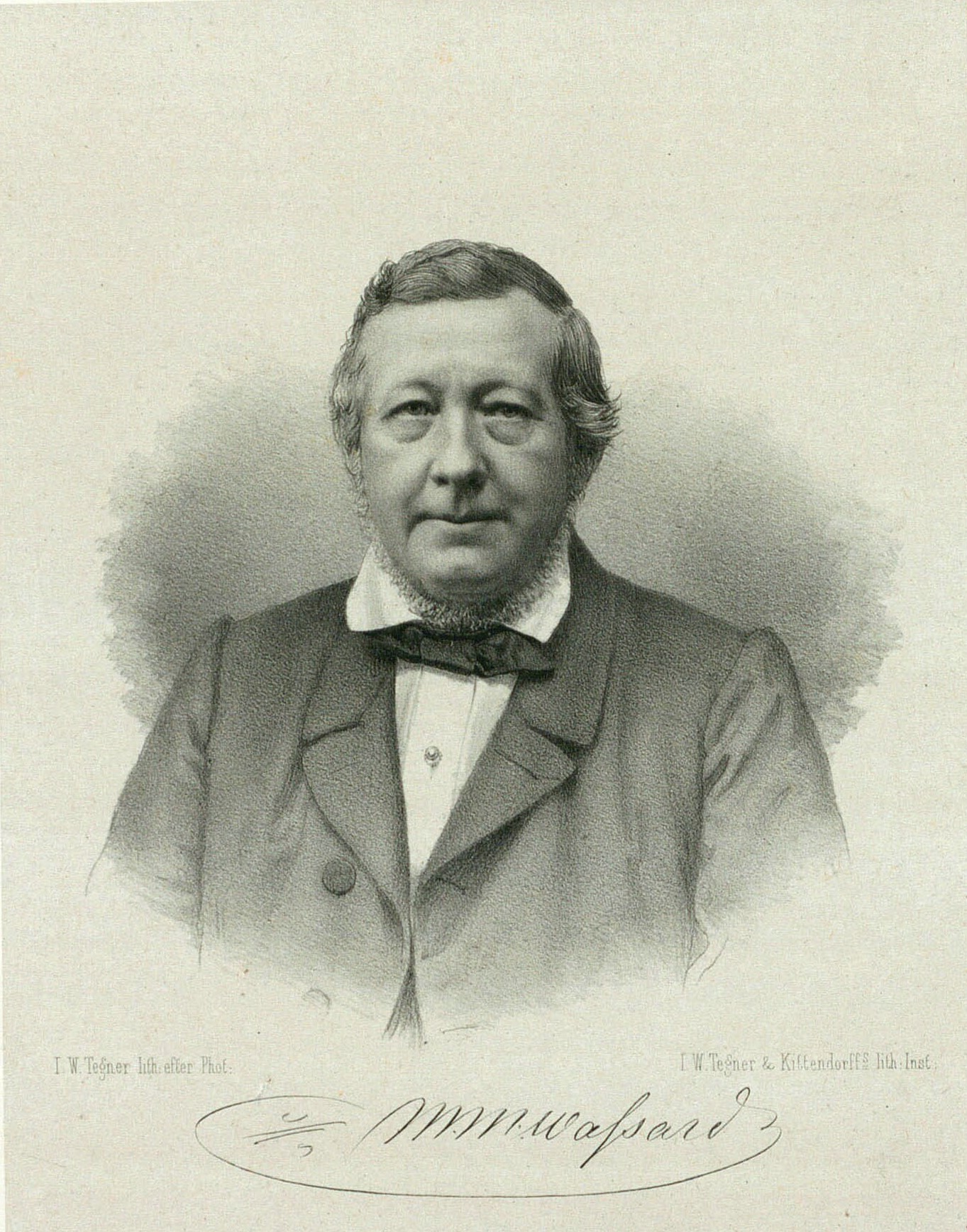
Morten Munk Wassard

Hans Wassard's first marriage was to Just Michael Aagaard's granddaughter, Lucie Emmerence Pedersdatter Aagaard (1761–1802). His second marriage was to Anna Marie Munk (1770–1838), daughter of the mayor of Copenhagen, Morten Munk (1730–1796), and Karen Barfred (1744–1780).

In 1839, Marienlyst passed to Morten Munk Wassard. On his death, it passed to his son Hans Mathias Wassard. His widow owned the estate until 1929. It was then passed down to their son M.M. Wassard.

== Architecture ==
The main building consists of a two-storey main wing with a short cross wing at each end. The main wing is topped by a ridge turret.

== Today ==
The estate is currently owned by Hans Mathias Munk Wassard. It covers a total area of 243 hectares (600 acres), of which 213 ha (530 acres) is farmland and 230 ha (570 acres) is woodland.

== Hans Wassard apple cultivar ==
The Hans Wassard apple cultivar was cultivated on the Marienlyst estate around 1850.

== List of owners ==
- (1810–1839) Hans Wassard
- (1839–1870) Morten Munk Wassard
- (1870–1898) Hans Mathias Wassard
- (1898–1929) Augusta Wassard, née Ringberg
- (1929–1951) M.M. Wassard
- (1951– ) M.M. Wassard
- (1990–present) Hans Mathias Munk Wassard
