= Snertingegård =

Manor house near Vordingborg, Denmark

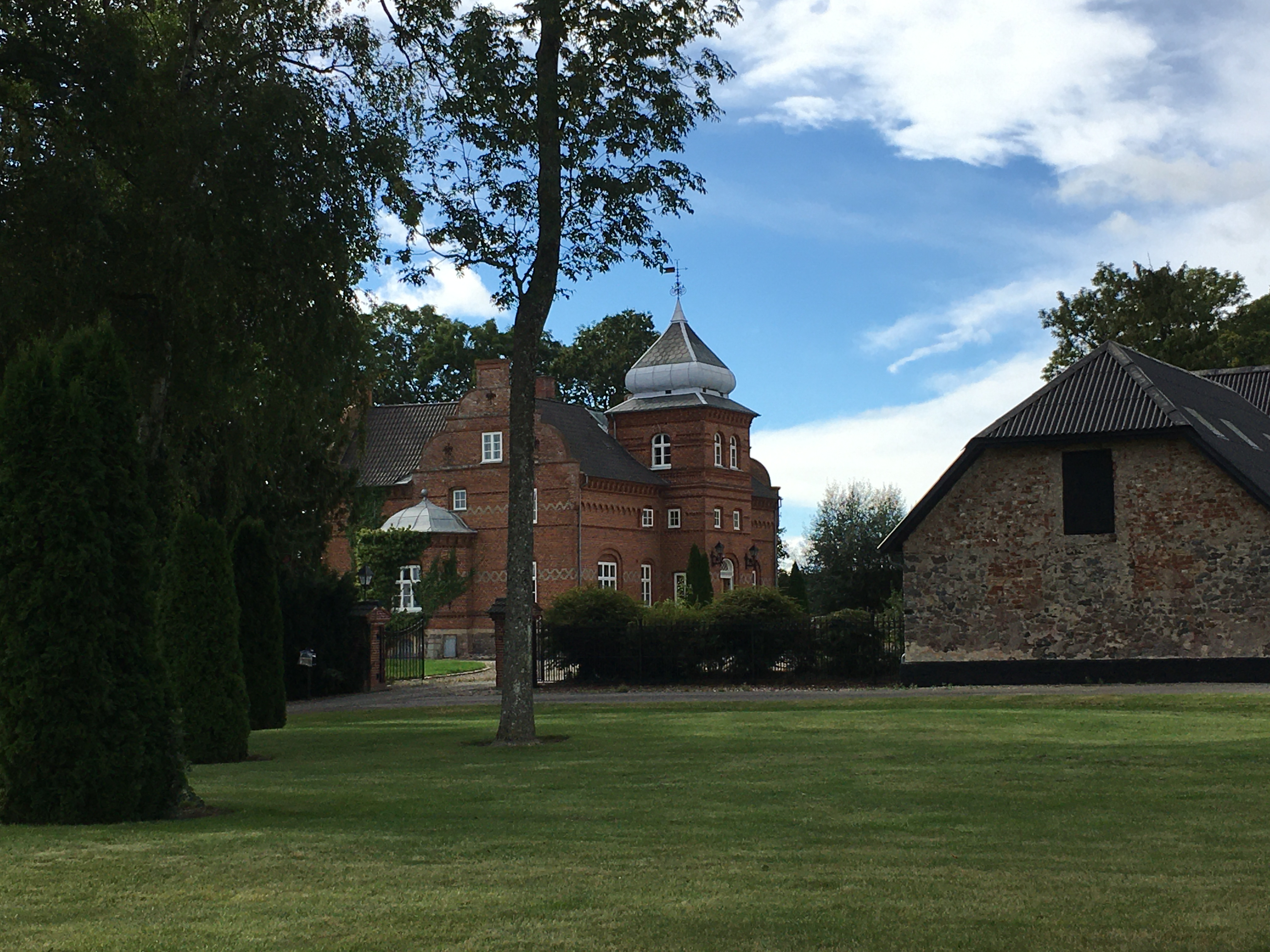
- Interactive map of the Snertingegård area

General information
- Location: Fæbyvej 121; 4760 Vordingborg, Denmark
- Coordinates: 55°3′54.7″N 11°55′11.4″E
- Completed: 1857

Snertingegård, also known simply as Snertinge, is a manor house and estate located just north of Vordingborg, in southeastern Denmark. It was one of 12 manors established after Vordingborg Cavalry District was dissolved in 1774. The Renaissance Revival style main building and home farm were built for Defence Minister Christian Frederik Hansen in 1857 from designs by Ferdinand Meldahl. Both buildings were listed on the Danish registry of protected buildings and places in 1978.

== History ==
=== Early history ===
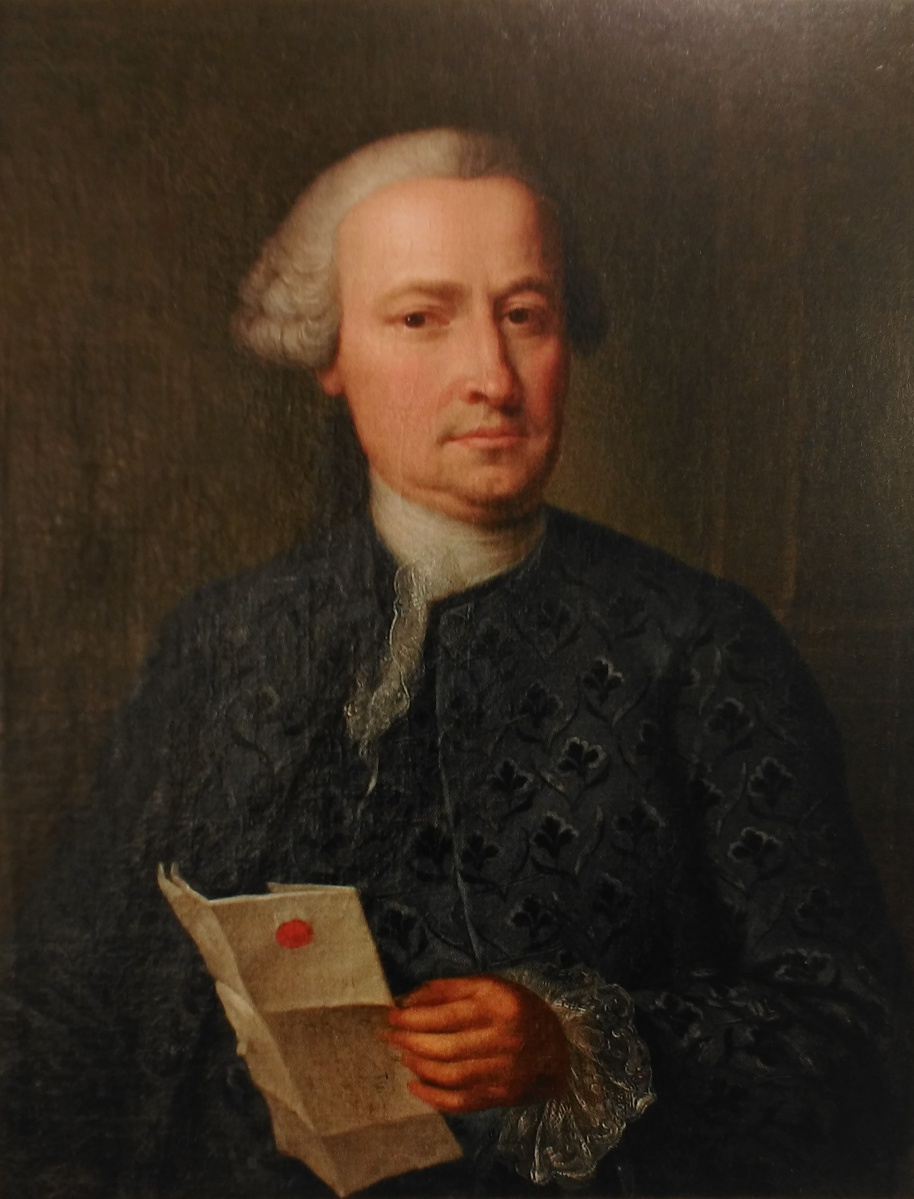
Reinhard Iselin painted by Georg Mathias Fuchs, 1766

In 1769, it was decided to sell Vordingborg Cavalry District. In 1774, it was therefore into 12 estates and sold in public auction. The auction took place at Vordingvorg Castle on 27 September. Snertingegård was sold to the wealthy merchant Reinhard Iselin from Copenhagen. He was also the buyer of Vordingborg Castle (renamed rosenfeldt), Ladegård (renamed Iselingen and Avnøgård.

=== Changing owners, 1804–1852 ===
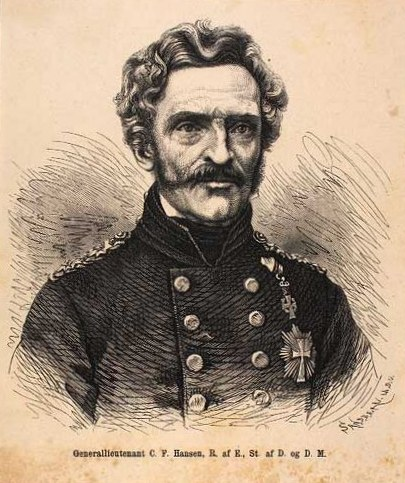
Christian Frederik Hansen

In 1804, Iselin's heirs sold Snertingegård, Iselingen and Marienlyst to Hans Henrik Peter Reiersen (1750–1805). He was born in Vordingborg as the son of Andreas Jensen Reiersen, a Lutheran minister who later served as pastor at Frederiksborg Chapel. His wife Birgitta Christina Christine Bernth was the daughter of headmaster of Herlufsholm School Johan Ludvig Bernth. In 1810, Reiersen sold Snertingegård to S. Busk. After Busk's death in 1833, Snertingegård was acquired by P. Lund.

=== Hansen and the new building ===
On his death in 1852, Snertingegård was sold to Christian Frederik Hansen. He served as Minister of Defence in several governments. Nicoline Marie Berggren, who is believed to have been the illegitimate daughter of Bertel Thorvaldsen, grew up on the Snertingegård estate. Her mother, who had met Thorvaldsen at Nysø Manor, her previous workplace, worked for Hansen.

Hansen's son Christian Frederik Gustav Hansen inherited he estate after his father's death. He was in turn succeeded by his own son, Edward Joachim Hansen. Edward Joachim Hansen's daughter, Agnes Nikoline Hansen, who was born on the estate in 1893, married the zoologist and educator Holger Valdemar Brøndsted.

=== 20th century ===
In 1905, Snertingegård was acquired by Ludvig Munthe Brun. His widow, Meta Brun, née Nielsen, sold it to P.F. Thymann in 1930.

== Architecture ==
The main building dates from 1856 to 1857 and was designed by Ferdinand Meldahl with inspiration from Renaissance architecture. The building is constructed in red brick and stands on a foundation of boulders. It consists of a two-storey main wing with a short side wing. Towards the courtyard is a centrally placed quadratic tower topped by a dome.

== Surroundings ==
Snertingegård is surrounded by a large garden.

In Snertinge Mose, a bogland, is an important settlement from the Maglemosian culture (9,000-6,4000 b.c.). A large number tools of bone and flint as well as numerous animal bones from aurochs, moose, red deer and wild boar has been retrieved from the site.

== Today ==
Snertingegård was purchased by Klaus Birger Liljegren Jønsson in 2004. He has previously been the owner of Fodbygaard at Nøstved.

== List of owners ==
- ( -1774) Kronen
- (1774-1781) Reinhard Iselin
- (1781-1804) Estate of Reinhard Iselin
- (1804-1810) Hans Henrik Peter Reiersen
- (1810-1833) S. Busk
- (1833- ) P. Lund
- ( -1852) Sophie Lund
- (1852-1873) Christian Frederik Hansen
- (1873-1875) Estate of Christian Frederik Hansen
- (1875-1899) G. Hansen
- (1899-1905) Hairs of G. Hansen
- (1905-1927) Ludvig Munthe Brun
- (1927-1930) Meta Brun, née Nielsen
- (1930-1954) P.F. Thymann
- (2004- ) Klaus Birger Liljegren Jønsson
