= Avnøgård =

Manor house in Vordingborg, Denmark

- Interactive map of the Avnøgård area

General information
- Location: Flyvervej 26; 4750 Lundby, Denmark
- Coordinates: 55°5′19″N 11°46′3″E
- Completed: 1903

Avnøgård (Avnø), is a manor house and estate located in Vordingborg Municipality, Denmark. The estate was acquired by the Ministry of Defence in 1836 and turned into an airfield, Flyvestation Avnø. It was decommissioned when the airbase moved to Karup in 1993. Part of the estate is now the site of a nature centre, Naturcenter Avnø.

== History ==
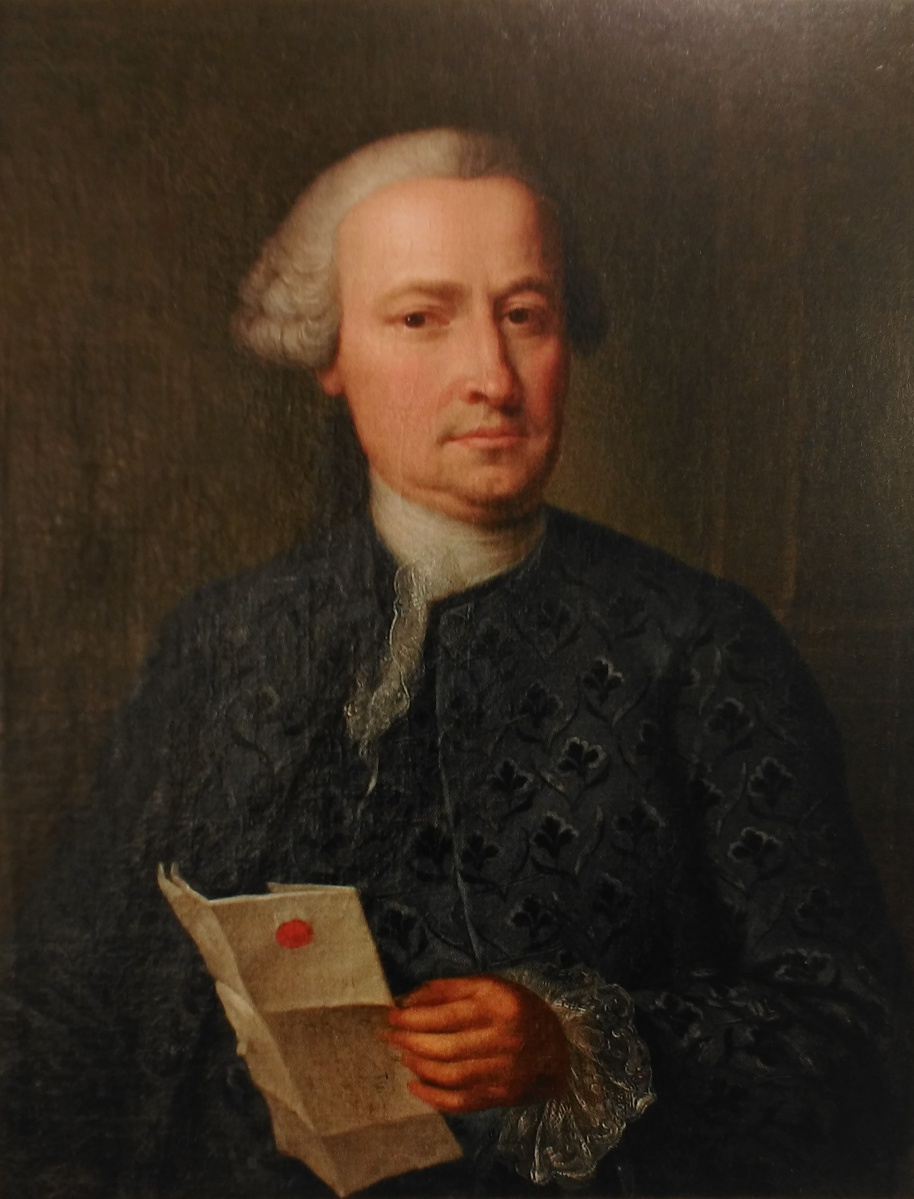
Reinhard Iselin painted by Georg Mathias Fuchs, 1766

In 1774, Vordingborg Cavalry District was divided into 12 estates and sold in a public auction. Avnø was sold to baron Reinhard Iselin. He was the buyer of Vordingborg Castle (renamed Rosenfeldt), Snertingåaard samt Ladegaard (renamed Iselingen) after the estates had been sold.

The buyer was Jens Lind, who later that same year sold the estate to Fredrik Hoppe. The next year Hoppe sold the estate to M. N. Friis. In the 1820s, Danish agriculture was hit by a crisis. In 1825, Avnø was sold to Jacob Staal. Staal's son, Hans Peter Staal, inherited Avnø after his father's death in 1851.

In 1854, Avnø was purchased by Abigael Christine Bølle. At age 17 she married 64-year-old Jacob Bølle of Vintersborg on Lolland. Her husband died in May 1845 and Vinterborg was sold to Frederik Anton Hastrup in 1848. In 1859, she ceded the estate to their son Jørgen Bølle. In 1861, he sold it to W. N. J. Benthien.

Carl Arthur George O'Neill Oxholm, the owner of Rosenfeld, purchased Avnø in 1877. In 1904, he sold the estate to Jacob Søegaard. The estate changed hands three times over the following three decades. It was decommissioned when the air base moved to Karup in 1993. In 2004 the airfield's buildings and part of the land were converted into a nature centre. The main building was sold to Micki Friebel in 2990.

== Architecture ==
The white-washed, two-storey main building dates from 1903. It was expanded in the mid-1910s. The older farm buildings are located to the west of the main building.

== List of owners ==
- ( -1774) Kronen
- (1774-1781) Reinhard Iselin
- (1781-1803) P.G.A. Bosc de la Calmette
- (1803) Jens Lind
- (1803-1804) Frederik Hoppe
- (1804-1824) M. N. Friis
- (1824-1851) Jacob Staal
- (1851-1854) Hans Peter Staal
- (1854-1859) Abigael Christine Bølle
- (1859-1861) Jørgen Bølle
- (1861-1877) W. N. J. Benthien
- (1877-1904) C. A. C. O'Neil Oxholm
- (1904-1921) Jacob Søegaard
- (1921-1922) Christensen
- (1921-1922) Christian Iversen
- (1922-1936) A. Prejsz
- (1936-1993) Flyvestation Avnø
- (2009–present) Micki Friebel
