= Kompagnistræde 14 =

Historical building in Copenhagen, Denmark

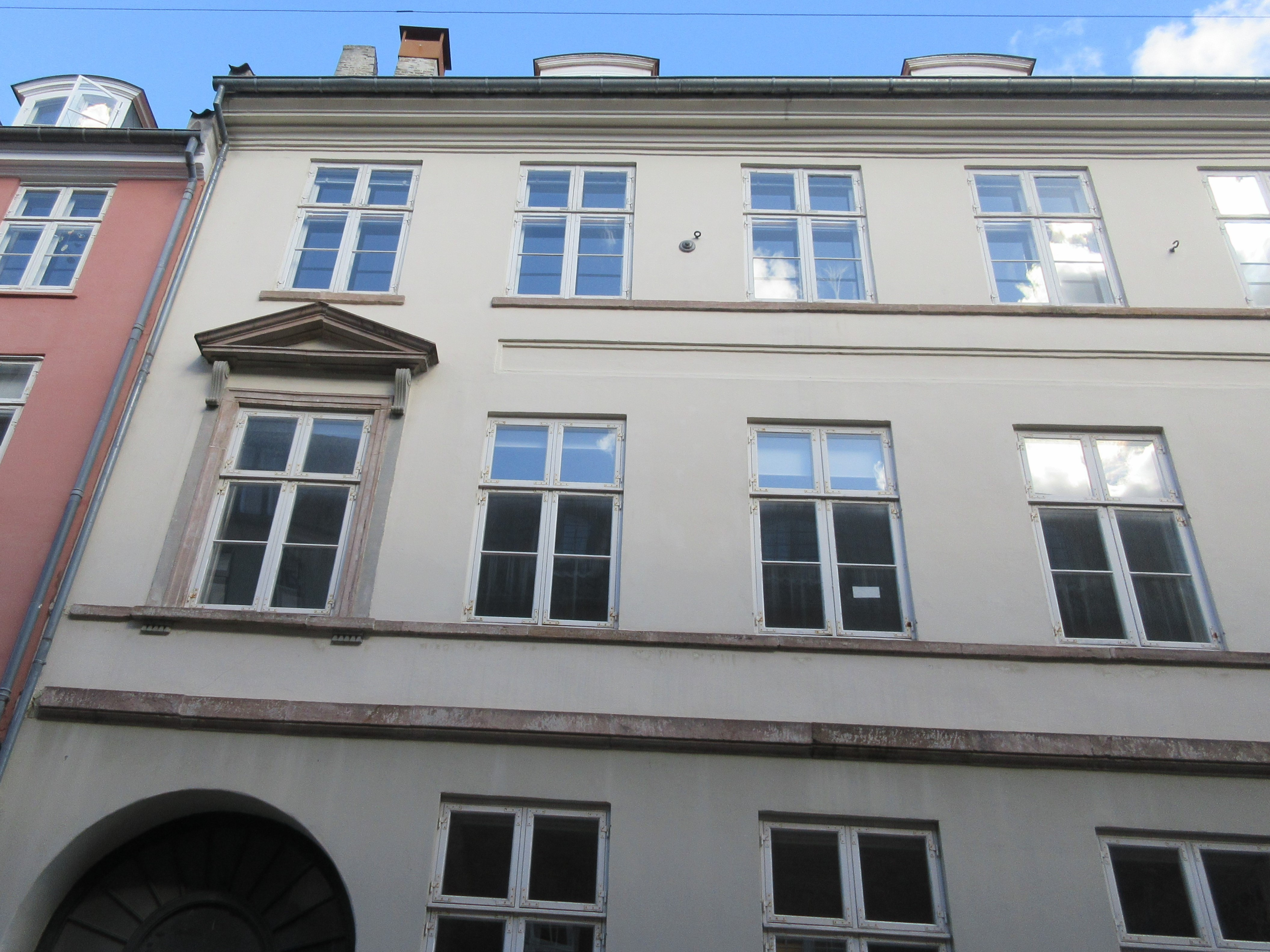
- Interactive map of the Kompagnistræde 14 area

General information
- Location: Copenhagen, Denmark
- Coordinates: 55°40′38.57″N 12°34′32.88″E
- Completed: 1798

Kompagnistræde 14 is a Neoclassical property situated on Strædet in the Old Town of Copenhagen, Denmark. Like most of the other buildings in the area, it was constructed as part of the rebuilding of the city following the Copenhagen Fire of 1795. A four-storey warehouse in the courtyard dates from 1855. The entire complex was listed in the Danish registry of protected buildings and places in 1939.

== History ==
=== 18th century ===
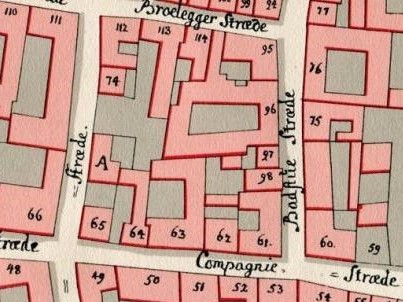
No. 63 seen in a detail from Christian Gedde's map of Snaren's Quarter, 1757

The site was formerly part of a large property owned by the Royal Danish Shooting Society. Their property was listed in Copenhagen's first cadastre of 1689 as No. 64 in Snaren's Quarter. This building was destroyed in the Copenhagen Fire of 1728 and not rebuilt after the fire. The property was instead divided into a number of smaller properties. The property now known as Kompagnistræde 14 was listed in the new cadastre of 1756 as No. 63, owned by painter Johan Jørgen Lassen.

No. 63 was acquired by director of the Royal Danish Mail Jens Lange (1713–1791). He was the eldest son of brewer Christen Michelsen Lange (died 1730), proprietor of the brewery at Vandkunsten 8. His property was only home to one household at the 1787 census. He lived there with his wife Anna Chathrina Bechmann, their son Herman Hendrich Lange, their daughter-in-law Magrethe Grøn, a coachman, a female cook, a male servant and two maids.

=== Bälckow and the new building ===
Together with most of the other buildings in the area, the building was destroyed in the Copenhagen Fire of 1795. The present building on the site was constructed in 1797–1798 by master mason Michael Bälckow.

Bälckow's property was home to a total of four households at the 1801 census. The owner resided in one of the apartments with his wife Marie Margrethe Møller, their four-year-old daughter Anne Magdalene Bølckov, maid Anne Jensdatter and coachman Hendrich Caspersen. Johan Mangelson Voigt, an army officer with the rank of major, resided in another apartment with his wife Anna Maria née Foss, their five children (aged three to fourteen), his stepbrother Anton Nicolai Burmester, one male servant and two maids. Johan Daniel Herholdt (1764–1836), a military surgeon, lived with Sophie Marie Berwald, their four children (two daughters and two stepsons), his sister Mette Cathrina Herholdt, four lodgers and two maids. The last of the four households consisted of printer Christian Casse, his wife Dorthe Schartse, their five children (aged three to thirteen) and one lodger.

The property was listed in the new cadastre of 1806 as No. 68 in Snaren's Quarter. It was owned at the time by a captain Gerstenberg. Actor Jørgen Peter Frydendahl (1766–1836) was among the residents from 1804 to 1808.

=== Salomonsen family ===
The property was later acquired by Jewish grocer (urtekræmmer) Marcus Moses Salomonsen (1770–1859). He had resided at No. 31 in Strand Quarter (1859: Læderstræde 24, now demolished) at the time of the 1701 census. At the time of the 1840 census, he was residing in the ground-floor apartment with his wife Tachel (Rebekka) Salomonsen née Meyer, two employees in his grocery business and two maids. Frederik Ludvig Frantz d'Auchamp (1810–1892), a High Court attorney, resided on the second floor with his wife Frederikke d'Auchamp née Harboe, their three-year-old daughter Alvilda Francisca d'Auchamp and the maid Marie Olsdatter. Anton Ferdinand Smidt, bookkeeper and cashier of the Chapter of the Royal Danish Orders of Knighthood, resided on the first floor with his wife Emilie Marie Smidt née van der Wellaing, their four children (aged two to nine), his sister Dorthea Christine Smidt, and two maids. Their then eight-year-old son F.C. Smidt would later become bank manager of the Bank of Denmark.

The property was later passed down to Salomonsen's son Levin Marcus (Moriz) Salomonsen. He constructed a new warehouse in the courtyard in 1855.

Levin Marcus Salomonsen's property was home to 27 residents at the 1860 census. The owner resided on the first floor with his wife Mine Salomonsen, their four children (aged 18 to 25), a male servant and two maids. Ida Bergda Esbensen, widow of physician Andreas Esbensen (1803–1856), resided on the second floor with her four children (aged 12 to 21), 22-year-old merchant Julianus Høffding and two maids. The ground floor apartment was occupied by a clerk in the Ministry of Defence, Conrad Martin Looft, and widow Frederikke Petrine Ingelsen née Lerche as well as shoemaker Lars F. Løvchald, his wife Christine Løvchald, their two children and two employees in his shoemaker's workshop. Christian Jeppesen and Niels Jørgensen, two medical students, resided in the garret. Peter Larsen, a third medical student, resided in the side wing.

=== 20th century ===
Fr. Christiansen, a wholesale business with colonial goods, components and machinery for the baking industry, founded on 20 February 1878 by Hans Frederik Christiansen (1851–1909), was for a while based in the building. The founder's son, Erik Chr. P. Christiansen (1882–1944), continued the business and it was later continued by Erik Glud. The firm was based in the building until at least the 1950s.

== Architecture ==
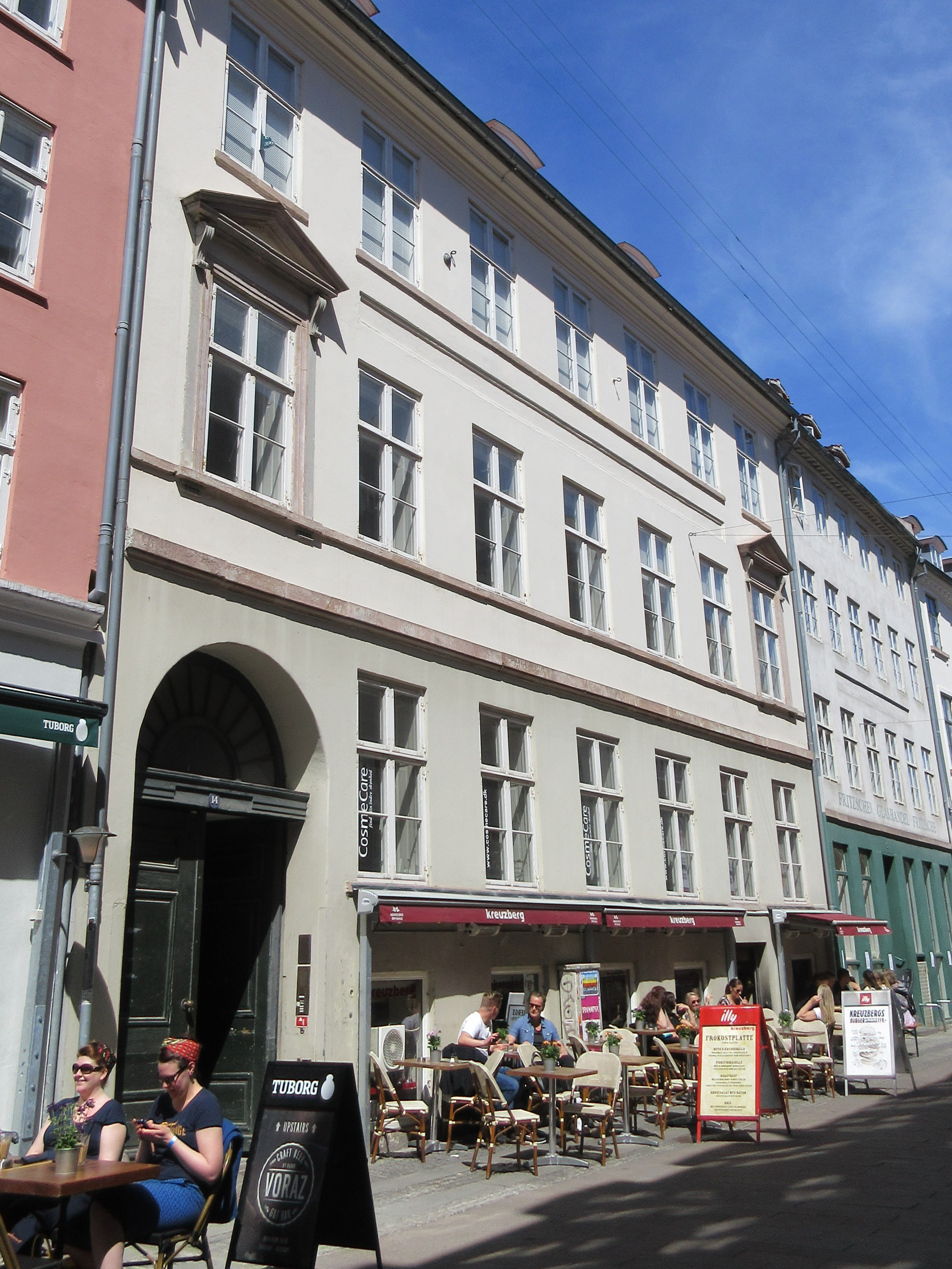
Kompagnistræde 14

Kompagnistræde 14 is constructed with three storeys over a walk-out basement. The plastered and grey-painted façade is finished with a narrow belt course of Nexø sandstone above the ground floor, sandstone sill courses below the windows (broken at the outer bay on the second floor) and a white-painted cornice. There is a blank, depressed frieze between the five central windows of the two upper floors. The outer windows of the first floor are topped by triangular pediments. The gate in the bay furthest to the left is topped by a fanlight. The basement entrance is located in the second bay from the right. The pitched roof is clad in red tile and features three dormer windows towards the street. The roof ridge is pierced by three chimneys.

The rear side of the building is plastered in an iron vitriol-yellow colour. A two-bay stairwell with the building's secondary staircase projects from the rear side of the building. The roof features a long, board-sided "factory dormer" towards the yard. Via a second stairwell (from 1855), the stairwell is attached to the warehouse (also from 1855) at the bottom of the courtyard. The four-storey warehouse is five bays wide and its facade is crowned with a gabled wall dormer with an intact pulley beam.

== Today ==
The building is currently owned by E/F Kompagnistræde 14 A-D. Café Søster is based in the basement.
