= Selskabet Kjæden =

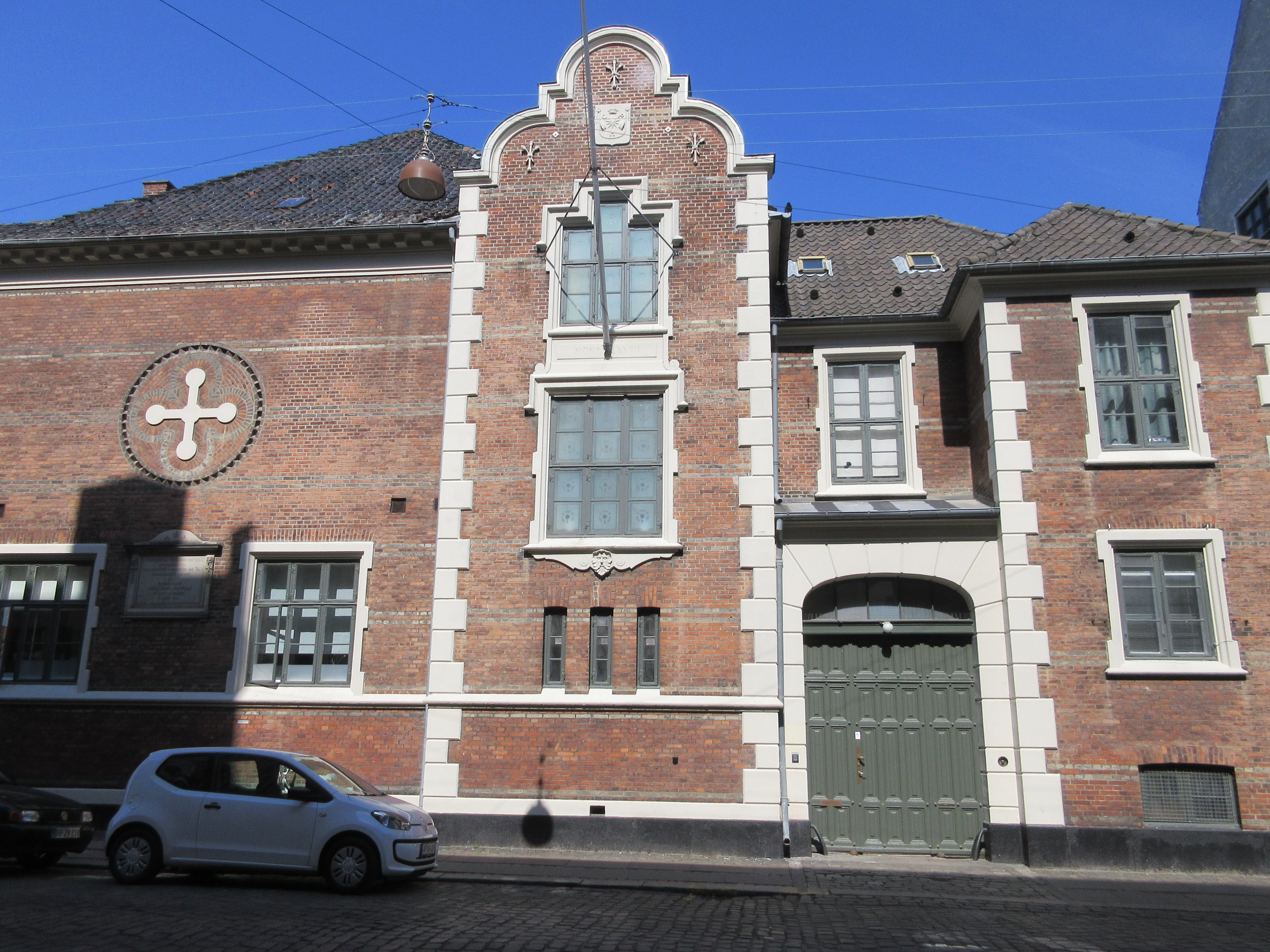
- Interactive map of the Selskabet Kjæden area

General information
- Architectural style: Historicism
- Location: Klerkegade 10, Copenhagen, Denmark
- Coordinates: 55°41′11.65″N 12°35′6.34″E
- Completed: 1869

Design and construction
- Architect: Vilhelm Tvede

Selskabet Kjæden (English: The Society of the Chain), formerly known as Kjæde-ordenen (English: The Order of the Chain), is a fraternal, philanthropical society based in Copenhagen, Denmark. The society has since 1811 been involved in work for blind people. Princess Elisabeth of Denmark is protector of the organization. Its building, situated at Klerkegade 10, was listed in the Danish national registry of protected buildings and places by the Danish Heritage Agency on 1 October 1989.

== History ==
The Order of the Chain is believed to have originated in St Canute's Guild in the 12th century. The Order of the Chain terminated its activities in the late 17th century but it was revived by a group of former freemasons on 27 November 1774. Membership of the order has been open to both men and women from the time of its foundation. The order has been engaged in social-philanthropical work since 1780. One of its first projects was to raise the necessary 100 rigsdaler for the construction of the first public school in Bornholm.

== Building ==
The Society of the Chain is headquartered in a low Renaissance Revival style building at Klerkegade 10 in Copenhagen. The design is by Vilhelm Tvede. It was´listed in 1989.

== Activities ==
From 1811 the order has been involved in work for the blind. In 1858, it financed the construction of the Royal Institute for the Blind which was ceded to the Danish state upon its completion. In 1876, it expanded its headquarters with two new wings which were used as a home for blind people. It remained in use until 1971.

Since 1829–30, the order has also catered to the poor in Copenhagen.

== See also ==
- Royal Copenhagen Shooting Society
