= Hans Wassard =

Danish businessman and landowner

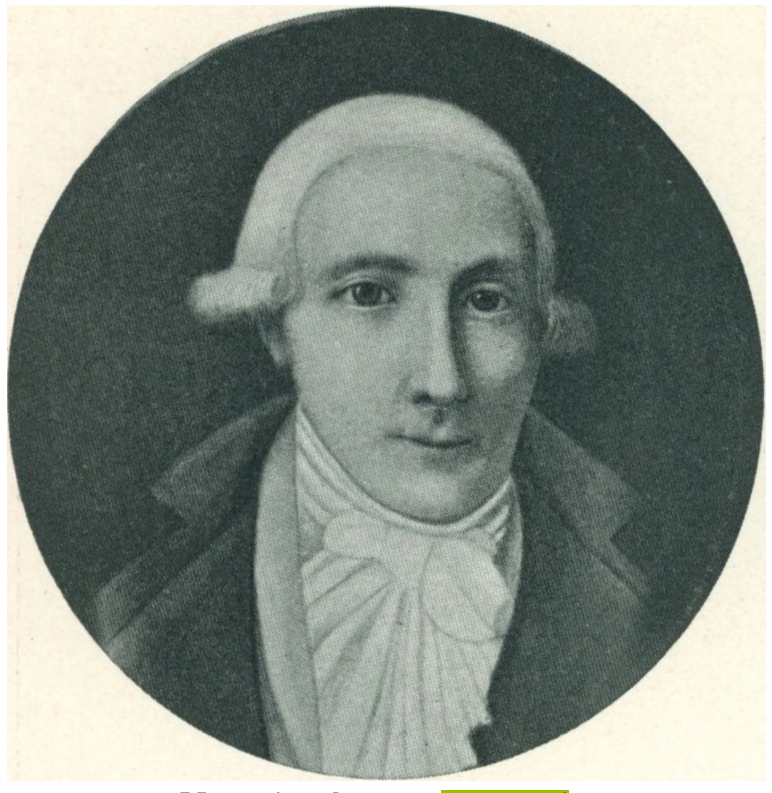
Hans Wassard

Hans Wassard (11 November 1756 – 29 October 1839) was a Danish merchant, landowner and one of Copenhagen's 32 Men. He invested in a number of privateer ships during the Gunboat War. He owned Marienlyst Manor at Vordingborg.

== Early life and background ==
Wassard was born at Vordingborg, the son of Mathias Hansen Wassard (1713–1884) and Elisabeth Catherine Aagaard (1733–1780). His father was the proprietor of the farm Holmgaard. His maternal grandfather was the businessman (grosserer) Ole Hansen Aagaard.

Wassard's father died at Holmegaard on 22 March 1774. The estate was sold by his mother in 1795. Hans Wassard was sent to Copenhagen for a commercial education. In 1787, he worked as bookkeeper for Jacob Gregorius Graah on Vimmelskaftet (Frimand's Quarter, No. 174).

== Career ==
On 19 June 1795, shortly after the Copenhagen Fire of 1795, Wassard was appointed as one of the extra directors of Kkøbenhavns Brandforsikring (Copenhagen Fire Insureance Company).

Onm 9 June 1795, he was granted citizenship as a wholesaler (grosserer) in Vopenhagen. In 1792–1794, he had served as fattigforstander in the Parhis of the Holy Ghost. On 22 December 1800, he was elected as one of Copenhagen's 32 Men.

He acquired his old employer's property on Vimmelskaftet (now Vimmelskaftet 30). At some point, he went from wholesaler (grosserer) to grocer (urtekræmmer). On 11 May 1808, in Adresseavisen, he advertised for skippers who could transport firewood for him from Vordingborg to Copenhagen.

== Privateering ==
Wassard fitted a total of six ships out as privateers during the Gunboat War. He received letters of mark for the following six ships:

- 7 December 1807: Hævneren (Challup, 16 men, captain Johannes Simonsen)
- 1808: Den Muelige (Lugger, 26 men, captain, Lars Flin)
- 1 August 1808: Hurtigheden (Lugger, 21 men, three guns, captain Lars Johansen Holm af Nex¿)
- 2 March 1809: Den Modige (Lugger, 22 men, captain Lars Rasmussen Brandt)
- 27 April 1810: Giengi¾ld (cutter, 25 men, captain Lars Johansen Holm af Nexø)
- May 1819; Den gode Hensigt (Lugge, 22 men, captain unknown)

== Property ==
On 20 July 1804, he was part of a consortium that purchased Iselingen for 310,000 rigsdaler from county manager Hans Henrich Peter Reyersen. The other members of the consortium were his brother-in-law Just Michael Aagaard, landvæsenskommissær Peder Bech, court bookprinter Johan Fredinand Schultz and Iver Qvistgaard.

In 1808, in Adresseavisen, Wassard advertised for skippers who could transport firewood for him from Vordingborg to Copenhagen. In 1806, Aagaard became the sole owner of Iselingen. In 1810, Wassard acquired Marienlyst from him and the farm was at the same time incorporated as an independent manor.

== Personal life ==
Wassard's first wife was Lucie Emerentze Aagaard (1761-). She was the eldest daughter of his mother's half brother Peder Andreas Aagaard, provost in Glostrup Parish, and thus the sister of the above mentioned Just Michael Aagaard. She died from Vattersot9 on 23 October 1802. On 2 February 1804, Wassard married to Anna Maria Munk )1771-1838). She was the daughter of mayor in Copenhagen Morten Munk and Karen Barfred (daughter of Frederik Barfred).

Hans Wassard died on 29 October 1839. He was survived by three sons and a daughter. The eldest son Jacob Gregorius Graahe Wassard (1790-= was married to Caroline Sophie Berg. The daughter Elisabeth Cathrine Wassard (1792-1850) was married to customs inspector in Rønne Christian Gotfried Ditlev Lohmann (1786-1829). The son Morten Munk Wassard )1911-= was married to Wilhelmine Mathilde Sincel. He inherited Marienlyst Manor after his father's death- The youngest son Mathias Wassard (1915-1879) studied law but became a landowner (''proprietær). He was married to Anine Christiane Lohmannm a daughter of his brother-in-law Christian Gotfried Ditlev Lohmann and his first wife Dorothea Magdalena Madsdatter Arboe.
