= Espe (manor house) =

Former manor house at Tappernøse, Denmark

- Interactive map of the Espe area

General information
- Location: Espevej 56; 4242 Boeslunde, Denmark
- Coordinates: 55°17′31″N 11°14′39″E
- Completed: 1848

Espe is a manor house and estate located at Boeslunde, between Korsør and Skælskør, Slagelse Municipality, some 100 kilometres southwest of Copenhagen. Espe has been listed on the Danish registry of protected buildings and places since 1918. The main building dates to the 18th century but was adapted to the Late Neoclassical style in 1848. The manor and estate has been owned by members of the Moltke family since 1810.

== History ==
=== Early history ===
Espe was originally the name of a village. In the Middle Ages, it belonged to the church. After the Reformation, it was confiscated by the Crown together with all other property of the Catholic church. In 1541 the village was replaced by a manor of the same name. In 1561, Espe was ceded to chancellor Johan Friis in exchange for property at Korsør. Espe was subsequently managed as a farm under Borreby. In 1667, Dorthe Daa sold Espe to Anders Mogensen. He ser as mayor of Skælskør. The estate was probably later acquired by Anders Hansen, since his widow, Anne Marie Andersdatter, is recorded as the owner in 1689.

=== 17th century ===
Anne Marie Andersdatter sold Espe in 1723 to Mette Rosenkrantz (died 1630). It was then sold by auction in 1730 for 10,000 rigsdaler to colonel lieutenant Christian Frederik de Boysset. He had also bought nearby Basnæs. He sold Espe by auction 1736 for 7,810 rigsdaler to merchant in Sorø Poul Schnabel. He sold it in 1747 for 8,200 rigsdaler to army major Friederich Lorentz von Bülow. In the same year, he had also bought Bonderup at Korsør. The two estates were later by his son sold for 15,510 rigsdaler to Johan Ludvig Schwerman. He sold it them in 1758 to Peder Christensen. Espe and Bonderup were subsequently sold to different buyers. Espe was sold to Folmer Danchel (died 1773). The new owner, Hans Thibi, committed suicide later that same year.

Espe was sold in 1774 to Morten Qvistgaard. Back in 1760, he had also bought Gerdrup and Lyngbygård. In 1775, he increased his holdings even further with the acquisition of part of Antvorskov Cavalry Fistrict. He was a member of the 1786 Agriculture Commission where he opposed the abolition of stavnsbåndet. He was the father of Iver Qvistgaard. 1In 1788, he ceded Espe to another son, Johan Rehling Quistgaard, who sold the estate in 1798.

=== 19th century ===
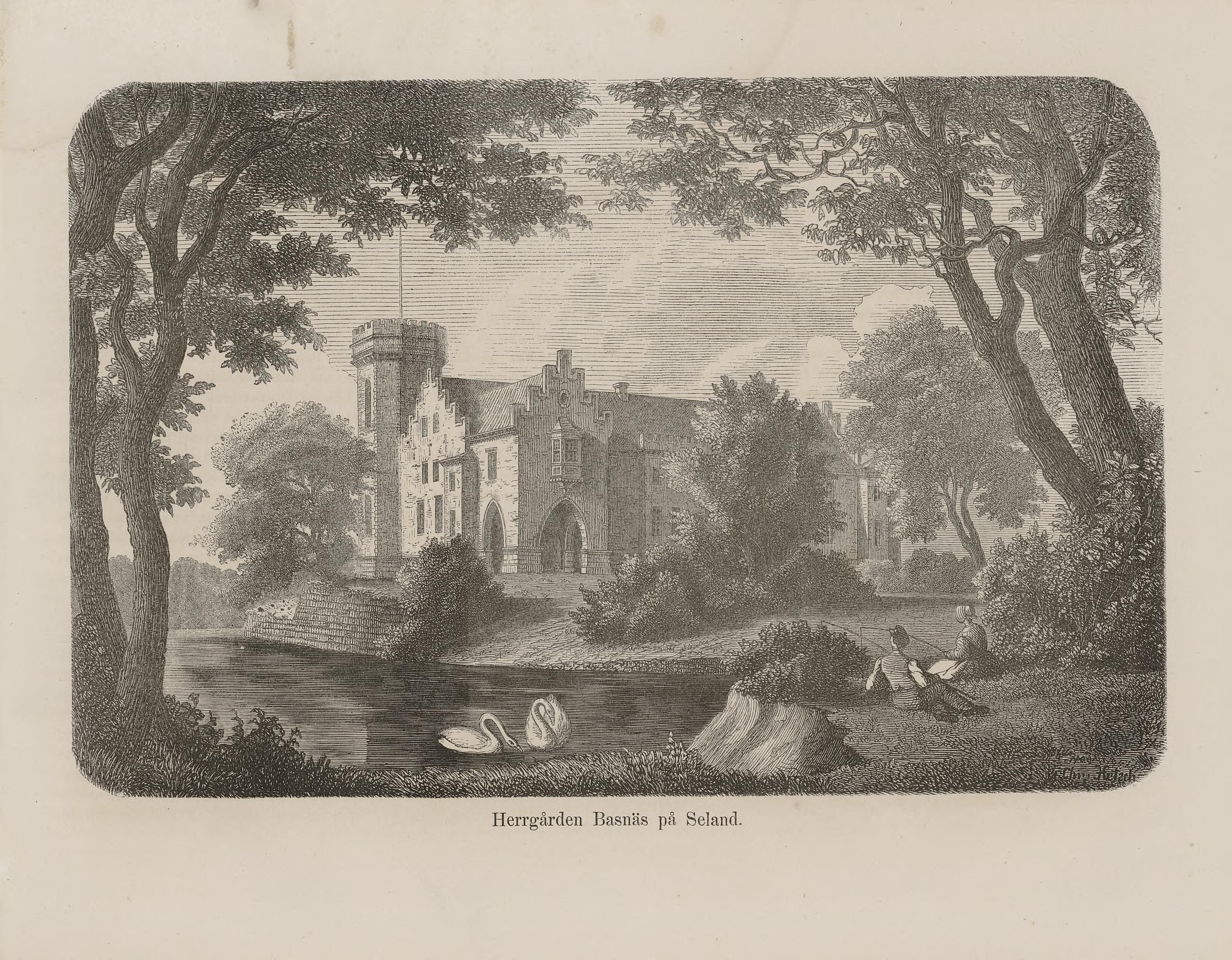
Basnæs in 1844.

In 1810, after having changed hands three more times, Espe was acquired by Otto Joachim Moltke. In 1825, he also purchased Bonderup. Moltke sold most of the tenant farms to the copyholders and constructed a new main building. He died in 1858. Espe and Bonderup then went to his son, Adam Gottlob Moltke, who was succeeded by his son Joachim Vilhelm Moltke in 1863. He died just five years later and his widow then managed the estate on behalf of their newborn son, Adam Gottlob Moltke. He ended up owning Espe for 90 years but for long periods of time lived elsewhere. After his death in 1958, Espe went to Adam Moltke-Huitfeldt.

== Today ==
The current owner is Elise Josephine Moltke-Huitfeldt.

== Cultural references ==
Espe was used as a location in the 1954 drama film Landmandsliv.

== List of owners ==
- ( -1561) Kronen
- (1561-1570) Johan Friis
- (1570-1616) Christian Friis
- (1616-1617) Mette Hardenberg, gift Friis
- (1617-1618) Dorthe Friis, gift Daa
- (1618-1641) Claus Daa
- (1641-1652) Jørgen Daa
- (1641- ) Dorthe Clausdatter Daa, gift Krabbe
- ( - ) Gregers Krabbe
- ( -1667) Dorthe Clausdatter Daa, gift Krabbe
- (1667-1682) Anders Mortensen
- (1682- ) Anderse Hansen
- ( -1703) Anne Marie Andersdatter, gift Hansen
- (1703-1719) Gerlach Thigullius
- (1719-1723) Anne Marie Andersdatter, gift Hansen
- (1723-1730) Mette Rosenkrantz, gift Ramel
- (1730) Boet efter Mette Rosenkrantz, gift Ramel
- (1730-1736) Christian Frederik de Boysset
- (1736-1747) Poul Schnabel
- (1747-1748) Frederik Lorentz von Bülow
- (1748-1750) Boet efter Frederik Lorentz von Bülow
- (1750-1758) Johan Ludvig Schwermann
- (1758-1760) Peder Christensen
- (1760-1773) Folmer Danchel
- (1773) Hans G. Thibi
- (1773-1775) Boet efter Hans G. Thibi
- (1775-1788) Morten Iversen Qvistgaard
- (1788-1798) Johan Rehling Qvistgaard
- (1798-1804) Cosmus Bornemann
- (1804-1805) Simon Groth Clausen
- (1805- ) Hans Frederik Uldall
- ( -1810) Frederik Christian Hansen
- (1810-1853) Otto Joachim Moltke
- (1853-1863) Adam Gottlob Moltke
- (1863-1868) Otto Joachim Vilhelm Moltke
- (1868-1958) Adam Gottlob Moltke
- (1958-1977) Adam Nicolas Moltke-Huitfeldt
- ( -2013) Adam Carl Moltke-Huitfeldt
- (2013- ) Elise Josephine Moltke-Huitfeldt
