= Vandkunsten 8 =

Neoclassical townhouse in Denmark

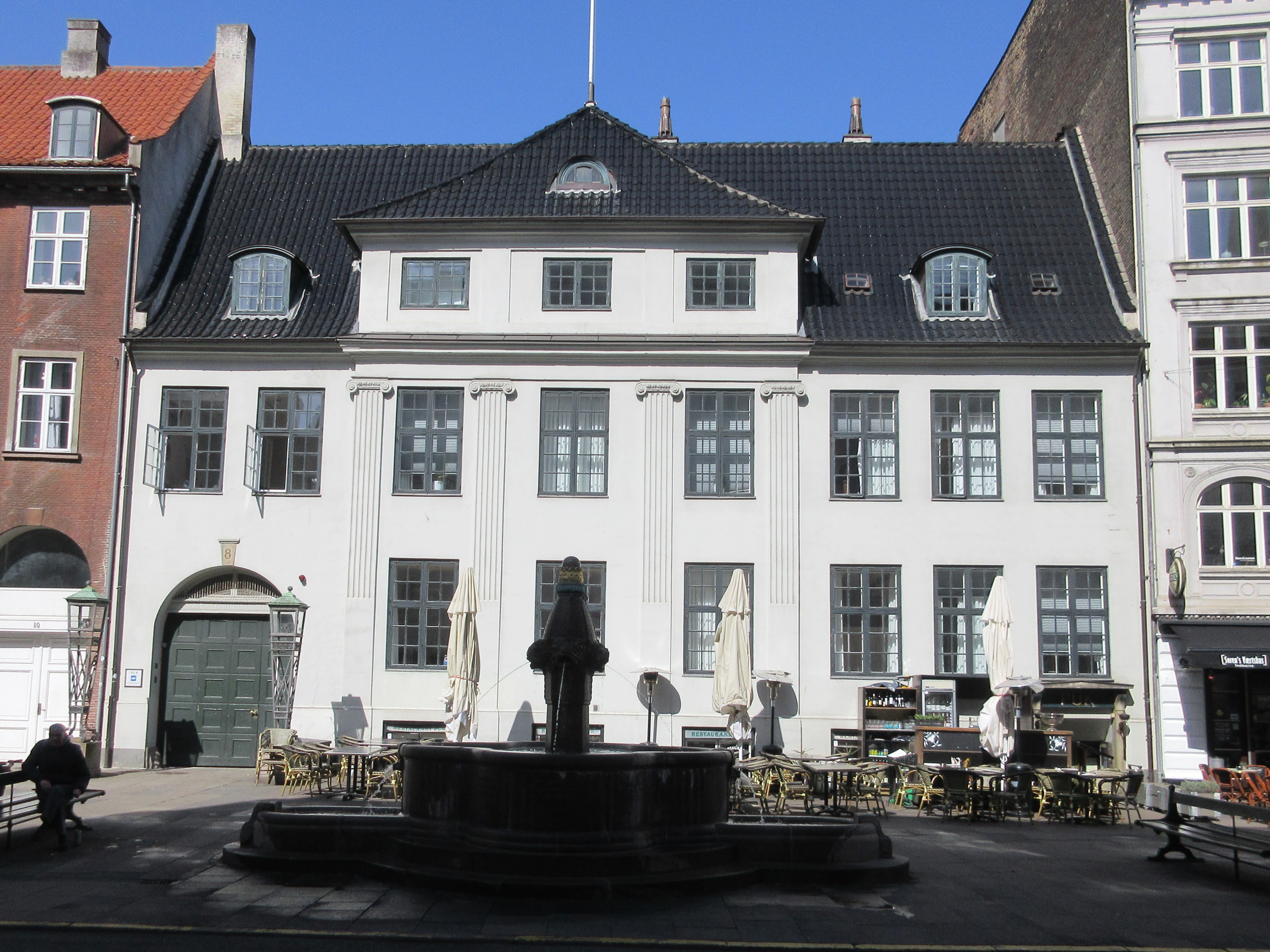
- Interactive map of the Vandkunsten 8 area

General information
- Location: Copenhagen, Denmark
- Coordinates: 55°40′34.27″N 12°34′26.44″E
- Completed: 1750
- Renovated: 1802, 1984

Vandkunsten 8 is a Neoclassical townhouse overlooking the small square Vandkunsten in the Old Town of Copenhagen, Denmark. A rear wing connects the building to a former warehouse, Kompagnihuset, wjocj faces Kompagnistræde (No. 39) on the other side of the block. Both buildings were listed on the Danish registry of protected buildings and places in 1918.

== History ==
=== 17th and 18th centuries ===
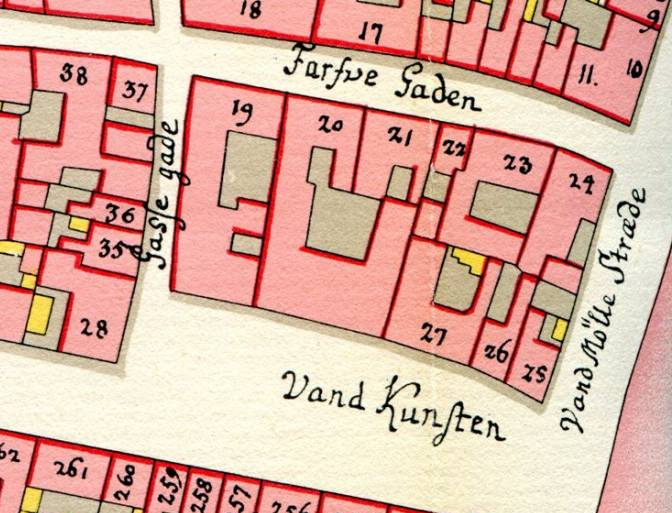
No. 21 seen on a detail from Christian Gedde's map of Copenhagen's West Quarter, 1757.

The property at the site was licensed as a brewery in 1740 but had by then already been used as such for centuries. It was at that time owned by brewer Christen Hoggesen but leased by another brewer, Gudmand Olsen, who later became the owner of it. His widow Birte Olsen kept the property until 3 May 1669. The next owner was brewer Jens Hendrichsen Cron. On 12 July 1685, he sold it to brewer Laurs Biørnsen. Bjørnsen's property was listed as No. 30 in the city's West Quarter in Copenhagen's first cadastre of 1689. On 14 June 1697, Bjørnsen purchased No. 23 on the other side of the block. On 26 June 1799, he also purchased No. 22. Bjørnsen's widow was after his death married to brewer Jens Jensen Bering. Jens ering and his wife Ellen Søfrensdatter both died during the plague outbreak of 1711. On 11 September 1713, their heirs sold it to their brother-in-law Christen Michelsen Lange. He was second time married to Margrethe Lindberg. The next owner was his son Peter Lange. The current building on the site was constructed in around 1750.

On 27 August 1787, the property was sold to assistant in the Icelandic Trading Company Hans Christian Lange.

=== 19th century ===
On 21 December 1801, Lange sold the property to kammerjunker Frederik Hoppe. Hoppe was already the owner of the more prestigious Bernstorff Mansion on Bredgade and must therefore have purchased the Vandkunsten property as a pure investment. On 4 June 1802, Hoppe sold the property to former ship captain Jens Lind. from whom he around the same time purchased Rosenfeldt and Avnøgård at Vordingborg. Lind moved the brewery to a new building facing Kompagnistræde on the other side of the block and converted the old one to a stately residence for his own use. The four Ionic order pilaster on the façade date from this time. His property was listed as No. 149 in the new cadastre of 1806.

On 23 January 1809, Lind sold the property to another ship captain, Amond Amondsen. On 8 January 1810, it was sold to Jørgen Hansen. On 27 July 1812, it was acquired by landvæsenskommissair and tenant/manager (Forpagter) of Møn Møn Kammerraad Andreas Poulsen Møller (c. 1764–1816). His widow Wibeke Kirstine Wackeprang (1778-1858) was later married to Kammerraad Adam Gotlob Lund (1764-1843). On 8 November 1819, Lund sold the property to beer seller (æltapper) and later brewer Poul Nicolaj Christensen. His widow Abigael kept the property until her death. The next owner was their son Poul Nicolaj Christensen. The architect Gustav Friedrich Hetsch lived in the building from 1824 to 1832.

On 11 October 1841, Christensen sold it to tenant brewer Peder Christian Christensen. His widow Catherine Elisabeth kept the property after his death. On 3 August 1874, it was acquired by merchant (urtekræmmer) Rasmus Valdemar Rasmussen.

On 3 January 1876, it was acquired by lawyer Vilhelm Schytte and already the same day sold to Frederik Horsens Block. Block had made a fortune in the Far East. He was the owner of Kokkedal House north of Copenhagen. On 30 November 1880, Block sold the property to the businessmen Jeppe Lauritsen & Martin Poulsen. On 10 January 1886, Poulsen became the sole owner of the property.

=== 20th century ===
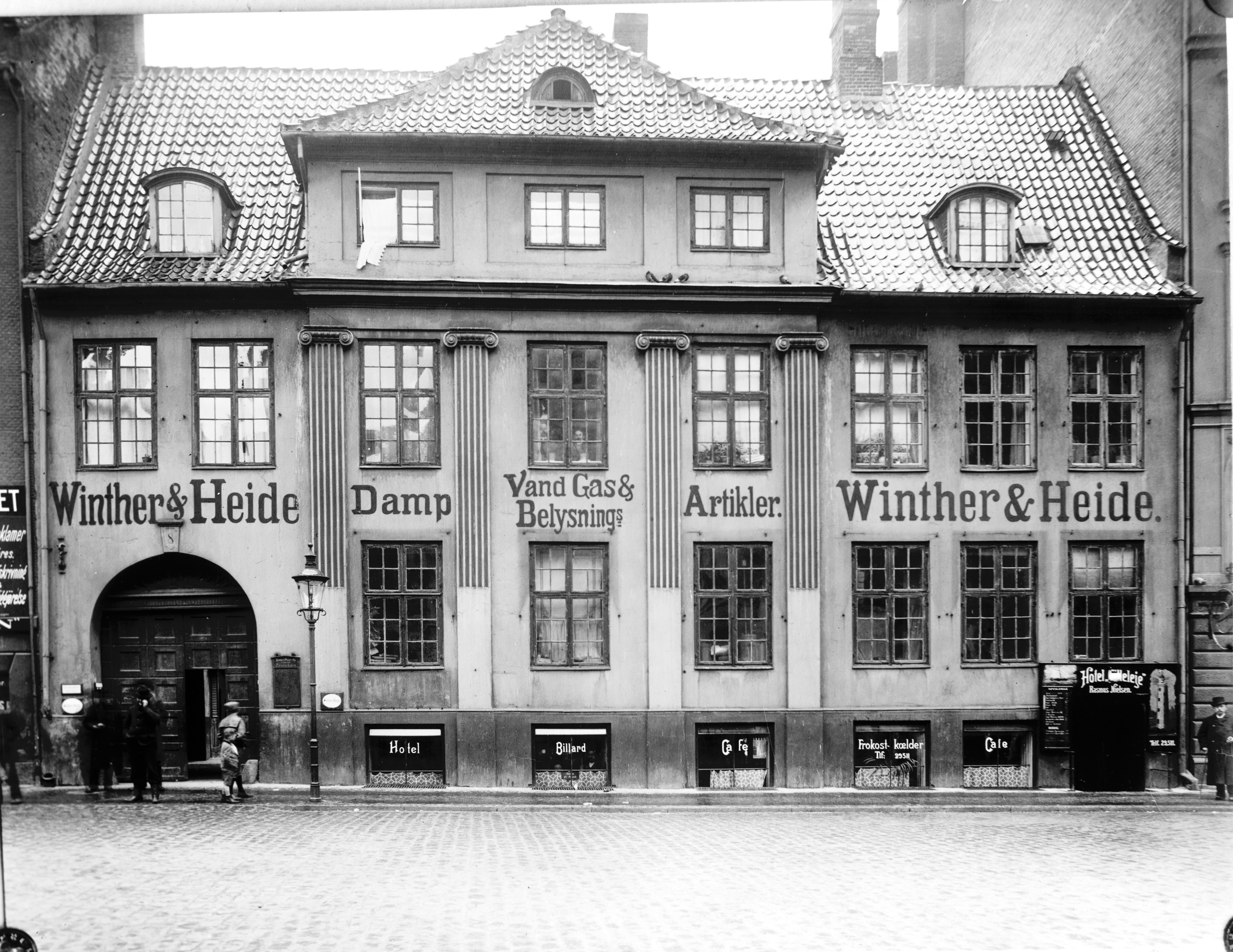
Vandkunsten 8 photographed by Frederik Riise

On 13 February 1905, Poulsen's widow sold the property to the businessman Oscar Heide. Winther & Heide, a manufacturer of lamps and metalware, was later based in the building.

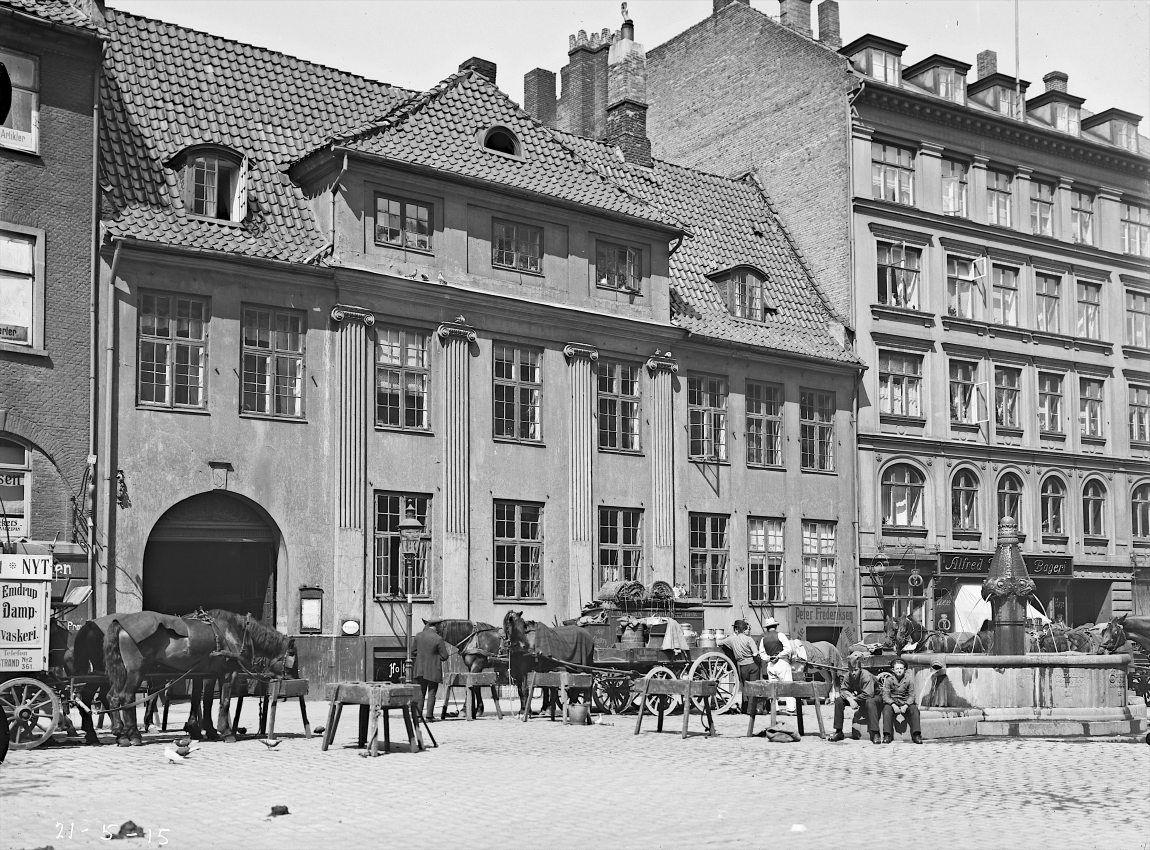
Vandkunsten 8 in 1914

On 20 December 1829, it was acquired by Niels Filtenborg. On 27 February 1922, it was acquired by Københavns Mørtelværkers A/S. The company was from then on based in the building..

Lærerstandens Brandforsikring G/S owned the building in the 1980s. It was restored by the architects O. Guldbrandsen (b.1928) and K. E. Sand Kirk (b.1922) in 1984 and their work received an award from Copenhagen Municipality the following year.

== Architecture ==
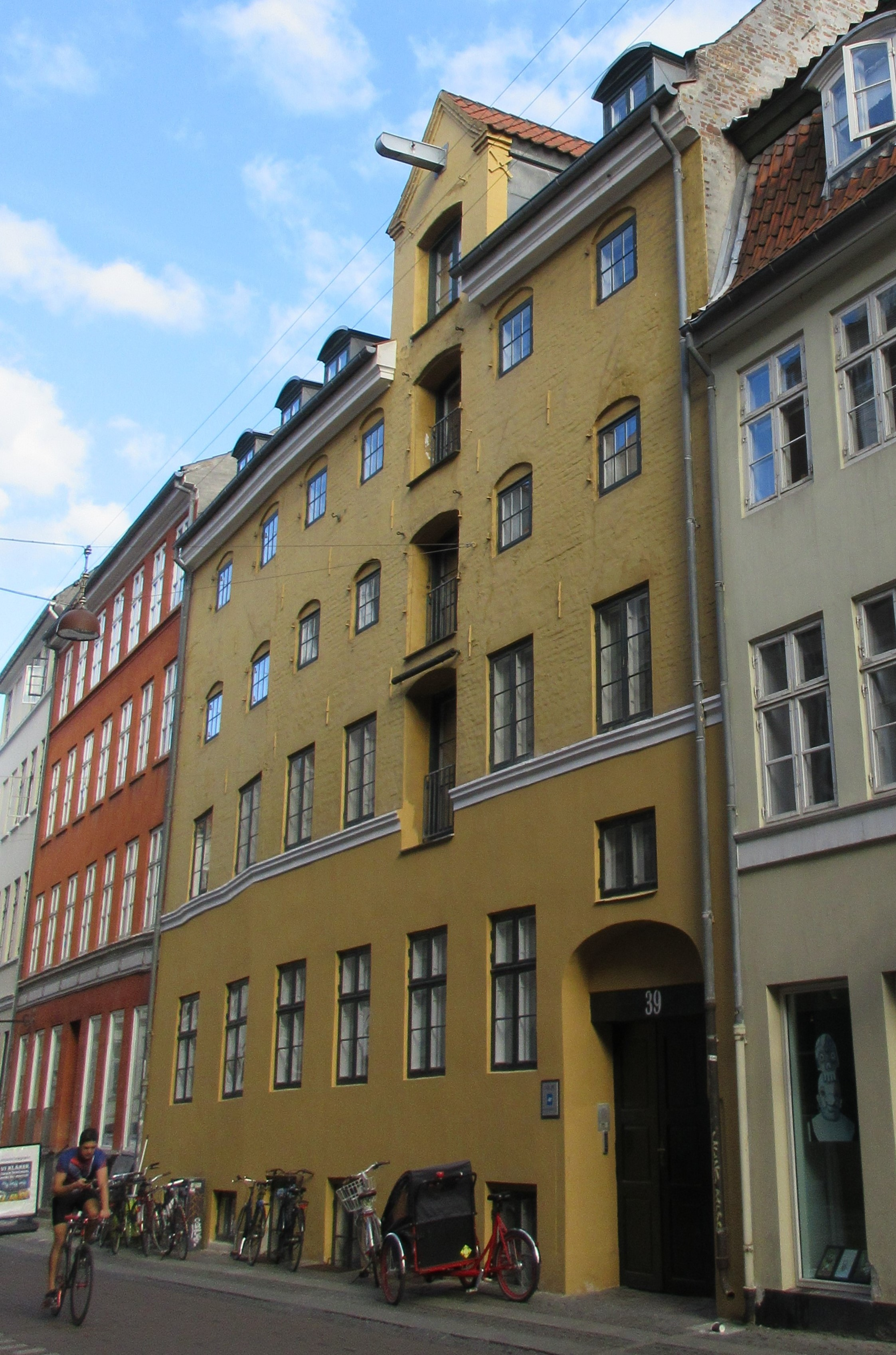
[The warehouse towards Kompagnistræde

The two-storey building is seven bays wide and roofed with black tiles. It has a three-bay median risalit tipped by a hipped wall dormer flanked by two smaller dormer windows. The median risalit is decorated with four Ionic pilasters. A gateway in the side of the building opens to a small courtyard. The gate is flanked by two lampposts dating from the 1920s. A three-bay side wing extends from the rear side of the building along the east side of the courtyard.

The four-storey warehouse on the other side of the block is seven bays wide and features an asymmetrically placed wall dormer with the remains of a hoist. A three-bay side wing to the rear connects it to the side wing of the house on Vandkunsten.

== Today ==
The insurance company Lb Forsikring A/S is based in the building. Restaurant Puk is based in the basement.

== Cultural references ==
Vandkunsten 8 is used as a location in the 1967 film Nyhavns glade gutter,
