= Iver Qvistgaard =

Danish mayor and landowner (1767–1829)

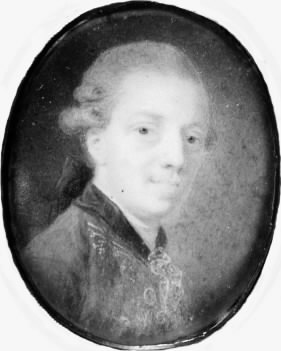
Iver Qvistgaard, miniature portrait by Cornelius Høyer

Iver Qvistgaard (28 October 1767 – 8 October 1829) was a Danish civil servant, landowner and mayor of Copenhagen. He owned Aagaard Manor at Holbæk and the country house Wesselsminde at Nærum. He also engaged in a number of other speculative investments on the turbulent property market during the Napoleonic Wars.

== Early life and education ==
Qvistgaard was born at Gerdrup, the son of Morten Qvistgaard and Martha Qvistgaard (née Rehling). His father had bought Lyngbygaard and Gerdrup in 1740. He increased his holdings with the acquisition of Espe in 1773. Qvistgaard acquired a degree in Latin and law from the University of Copenhagen in 1789. He then went on a Grand Tour through Germany, Switzerland, Italy, France and England. In 1790–1792, he continued his studies at the University of Göttingen. He published Index chronoligicus sistens foedera pacis defensionis, navigationis, commerciorum, subsidiorum et alia a regibus Dania et Norvegiæ ac comitibus Holsatia inila cum gentibus intra et extra Evropam nec non capitulationes, literas et mercaturæ privilegiæ ab anno 1200 (Gøttingæ, 1792) prior to his departure.

== Career ==
In 1793, after working for some time as a volunteer in the Danske Kancelli, he was employed as a chancellery secretary in Copenhagen. He unsuccessfully aspired to become a diplomat.

On 7 August 1810, Qvistgaard was appointed as real etatsråd. On 4 September 1816, he was appointed as 2nd vice mayor of Copenhagen. On 31 March 1819, he was appointed as 2nd mayor of Holbæk Amt.

== Property ==
On 18 December 1796, he acquired Aagaard Manor at Holbæk for 112,500 Danish rigsdaler. On 22 December 1801, he sold Aagaard for 165,000 rigsdaler to Joachim Moltke. In 1802, he purchased Wesselsminde in Nærum from Colbjørnsen (sold in 1808). In 1810, he was part of a consortium that bought part of the Bernstorff Mansion in Copenhagen for 50,000 rigsdaler. The other members of the consortium were landvæsenskommissær Peder Bech, merchant Just Michael Aagaard, court bookprinter Johan Fred. Schultz and wholesaler Hans Wassard. On 20 July 1804, they also purchased Iselingen for 310,000 rigsdaler from county manager Hans Henrich Peter Reyersen. In 1810, Qvistgaard parted with his share of the Iselingen estate. It was subsequently divided between Aagaard (Idelingen) and Wassard (Marienlyst Manor).

== Personal life ==
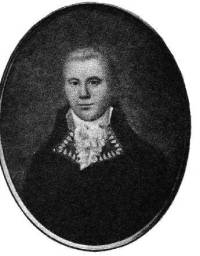
Iver Qvistgaard

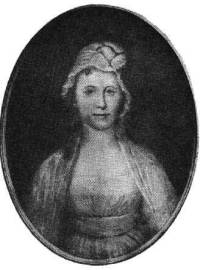
Ellen Marie Qvistgaard, née Dinesen.jpg

On 19 September 1796, Qvistgaard married Ellen Maria Dinesen (1777–1827), daughter of former town bailiff and councilman in Roskilde Anders Dinesen (died 1793) and Severine Dorothea Kraft. Her brother Jens Kraft Dinesen owned Gyldenholm Manor.

Qvistgaard was a member of the Royal Danish Society of National History (Det Kgl. Danske Selskab for Fædrelandets Historie og Sprog). He died on 8 October 1829 at Guldagergaard.
