= Gramlille =

House in Lyngby-Taarbæk Municipality, Denmark

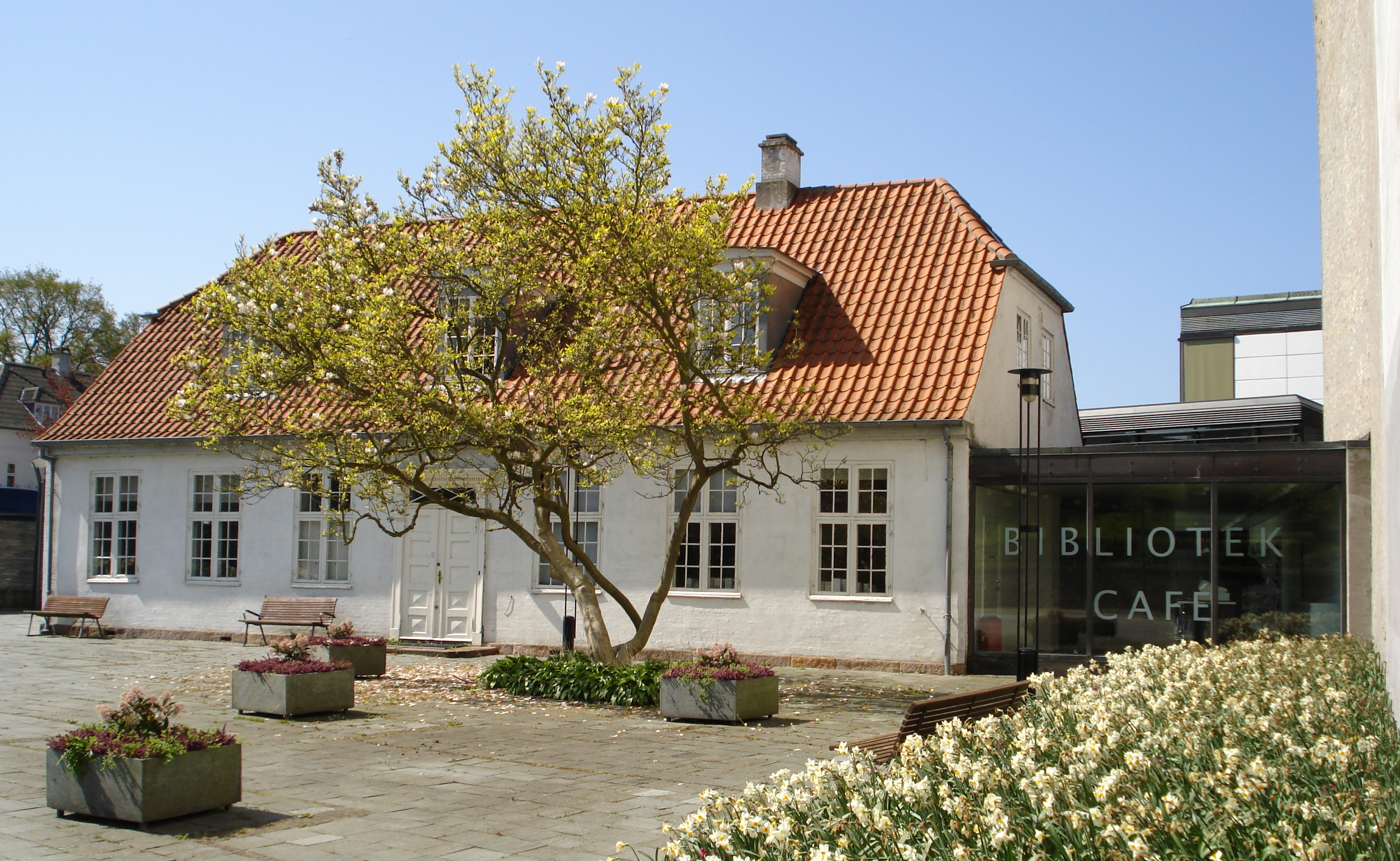

General information
- Location: Kongens Lyngby, Denmark
- Coordinates: 55°46′23.97″N 12°29′56.43″E

Gramlille is a listed house located on the Main Street in Kongens Lyngby, opposite Lyngby Church, in the northern suburbs of Copenhagen, Denmark. The building is today part of Lyngby Library and is connected to the main library building by a glazed corridor in its north gable.

== History ==
The property traces its history back to 1748 when the French envoy in Copenhagen, Abbé Lemaire, constructed a country site next to Lyngby Church. It was located on rented land and belonged to the land owner Jean Henri Desmercières after Lemaire was called back to France in 1753. He sold it to the merchant Reinhard Iselin in 1757.

The property was 1767 purchased by the printmaker and later professor at the Royal Academy Johan Martin Preisler. He belonged to the so-called "Bernstorff Circle", a group of German civil servants, writers and artists associated with the influential Count Johann Hartwig Ernst von Bernstorff. The group met at Preisler's house in Lyngby in the summer time from 1761. The most notable member of the group was the poet Friedrich Gottlieb Klopstock who lived in Denmark from 1751 to 1770. A great lover of nature, he went for walks in the surrounding countryside in the summer time and ice skated on Lyngby Lake in winter. Klopstock's Oak at Prinsessestien is named after him. From 1754 to 1758, Klopstock lived with his wife Meta in Lyngby during the summer months, probably together with his brother August who managed a silk factory founded by Klopstock's friend Hartmann Rahn at a site just north of the church in 1752. After his wife's death in childbirth in 1758, Klopstock no longer spent his summers in Lyngby but he was still a frequent visitor in Preisler's house until 1770. Another member of the circle was the German court pastor Johan Andreas Cramer who owned a country house at nearby Stades Krog from 1756 to 1768. Friedrich Gabriel Resewitz, who was pastor at the German church in Copenhagen, owned Jægergården at Prinsessestien from 1769 to 1773. When J. H. E. Bernstorff was fired by Struense in 1770 and left Denmark, the circle slowly disintegrated but Preisler owned the house in Lyngby for another 20 years. His guests included the German priest Balthasar Münter, who visited him together with his daughter Friederike, the later wife of Constantin Brun and a well-known salonist at Sophienholm.

The house was acquired by Hother Müffelmann in 1875. He introduced the current name which refers to a farm in Gram that he leased.

The building was acquired by Lyngby-Taarbæk Municipality in 1955 and housed Lyngby Library's department of music from 1963.

== Today ==
Lyngby Library's music department moved out in 2004 and the building has since then been used as office space and for meetings and teaching purposes.

== See also ==
- Lottenborg
