= Just Michael Aagaard =

Danish merchant and konditori-owner

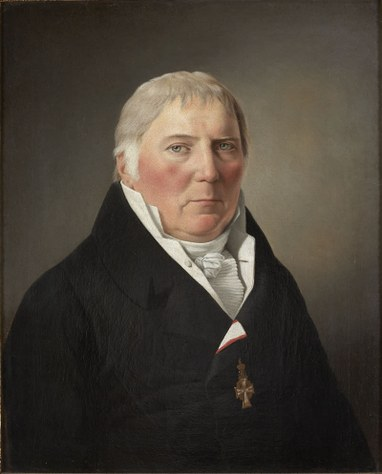
- Just Michael Aagaard painted by C. W. Eckersberg
- Born: 17 July 1757; Glostrup, Denmark
- Died: 7 October 1819 (aged 62); Iselingen, Denmark
- Occupations: Merchant, baker
- Known for: Council of 32 Men
- Awards: Knight of the Dannebrog

Just Michael Aagaard (17 July 1757 – 7 October 1819) was a Danish merchant and konditori-owner in Copenhagen. He served as chair of the Council of 32 Men (later to become the Copenhagen City Council) and was director of Kjøbenhavns Brandforsikring (Copenhagen Fire Insurance). He was the father of Holger Halling Aagaard and owned Iselingen at Vordingborg from 1806.

== Early life ==
Aagaard was born at the rectory in Glostrup, the son of provost Peder Andreas Aagaard and Sophie Margrethe Heerfordt.

== Career ==
Aagaard moved to Copenhagen where he became a baker and also opened a grocery store. He was based at Klædeboderne 144. He later became a member of the Council of 32 Men. He also served as director of Copenhagen Fire Insurance.

== Property ==
In 1804, together with Mayor of Copenhagen Iver Qvistgaard, Peder Bech, and Hans Wassard, Aagaard established a consortium which acquired the manors of Iselingen and Marienlyst at Vordingborg. Aagaard became the sole owner of Iselingen in 1806 while Wassard acquired full ownership of Marienlyst in 1810.

== Personal life ==
He married Maren Halling ( 24 July 1758 – 12 March 1817). They had a son, Holger Halling Aagaard, and a daughter, Christiane Aagaard (15 January 1785 – 11 June 1866).
