= Jens Lind (businessman) =

Danish sea captain and slave trader (1763–1821)

Jens Lind (1763 or 1764 – 11 November 1821) was a Danish sea captain, ship-owner, merchant, slave trader, landowner and industrialist. He was from the late 1780s until 1806 active in the Triangle Trade and was as such responsible for the shipment of somewhere between 1,800 and 2,000 slaves from Guinea to the Danish West Indies, approximately half of them illegally after the abolition of the trans-atlantic slave trade in 1803. He was from around 1800 also involved in a substantial number of industrial enterprises, including a brewery at Vandkunsten 8 in Copenhagen (from 1802) and a paper mill, oil mill and soap factory on the Hulemose estate at Vordingborg (from 1808).

== Early life ==
Lind was born in 1763 or 1764 in Christianshavn, Copenhagen, the son of Hendrich Jensen Lind and Anna Dothea Olufsdatter. He was baptized on 31 July 1764 in the Church of Our Saviour. His confirmation took place on 27 April 1778 in St. Peter's Church.

Lind's father is from at least 1761 mentioned as a mate (styrmand) in the service of the Danish Asiatic Company. In the 1770s, he became engaged in the Triangle Trade. In 1779, he thus captained the frigate Postillionen on an expedition to Guinea. In 1781-82, he captained the Østersøisk-guineiske Handelsselskab's frigate Gehejmeraad Gregers Juel on an expedition to the Danish West Indies by way of Guinea, most likely the Danish Gold Coast, picking up 298 slaves on the way.

== Ship captain, ship-owner and slave trader ==
Jens Lind began his career at sea as a cabinboy after his confirmation and passed his navigational exams on 15 April 1793. In c., 1787, he acquired the brig Haabet. In 1797 it sailed to Guinea, no doubt to pick up a cargo of slaves but it is not known how many, before proceeding to the Danish West Indies. Haabet departed from Saint Croix on 22 August 1787 and called at Saint Thomas two days later before returning to Denmark, arriving in Copenhagen on 16 October. It is believed that Lind did not return to Denmark with the ship and the next years seems to have spent most of his time either in the Danish West Indies or Guinea.

Lind was in 1796 married to Anthonette Philippine Wrisbergl (1776-) in Copenhagen. Her father was Friedrich Lind, owner of the plantation Prospect Hill on Saint Croix. She was born on the island and it is likely that Lind brought her with him back to Copenhagen. Their first children, born between 1797 and 1806, were all baptized in St. Peter's Church. The family settled in Christianshavn from where Lind was active in the Triangle Trade.

Slave trading: In 1797 and again in 1800, Lind sent Albertine Wilhelmine to the Danish West Indies with 166 surviving slaves on arrival on the first expedition and 139 on the second expedition. It was followed by an expedition with Martha Magdalena in 1801 (137 slaves). Denmark had abolished the Trans-Atlantic slave trade in 1792 with effect from 1803 but Lind continued his activities illegally with increased intensity for a few more years. In 1803, he thus sent the ships Martha Magdalena (176 slaves), Kronprinsesse Maria (409 slaves) and Experiment (143 slaves) to the West Indies. In 1794, he completed his third expedition with Martha Magdalena (176 slaves). It was followed by an expedition with Nicoline (302 slaves) in 1805. In 1806, he completed his last expedition to the Danish West Indies with the ship Christiansborg (133 slaves).

== Industrialist and landowner ==
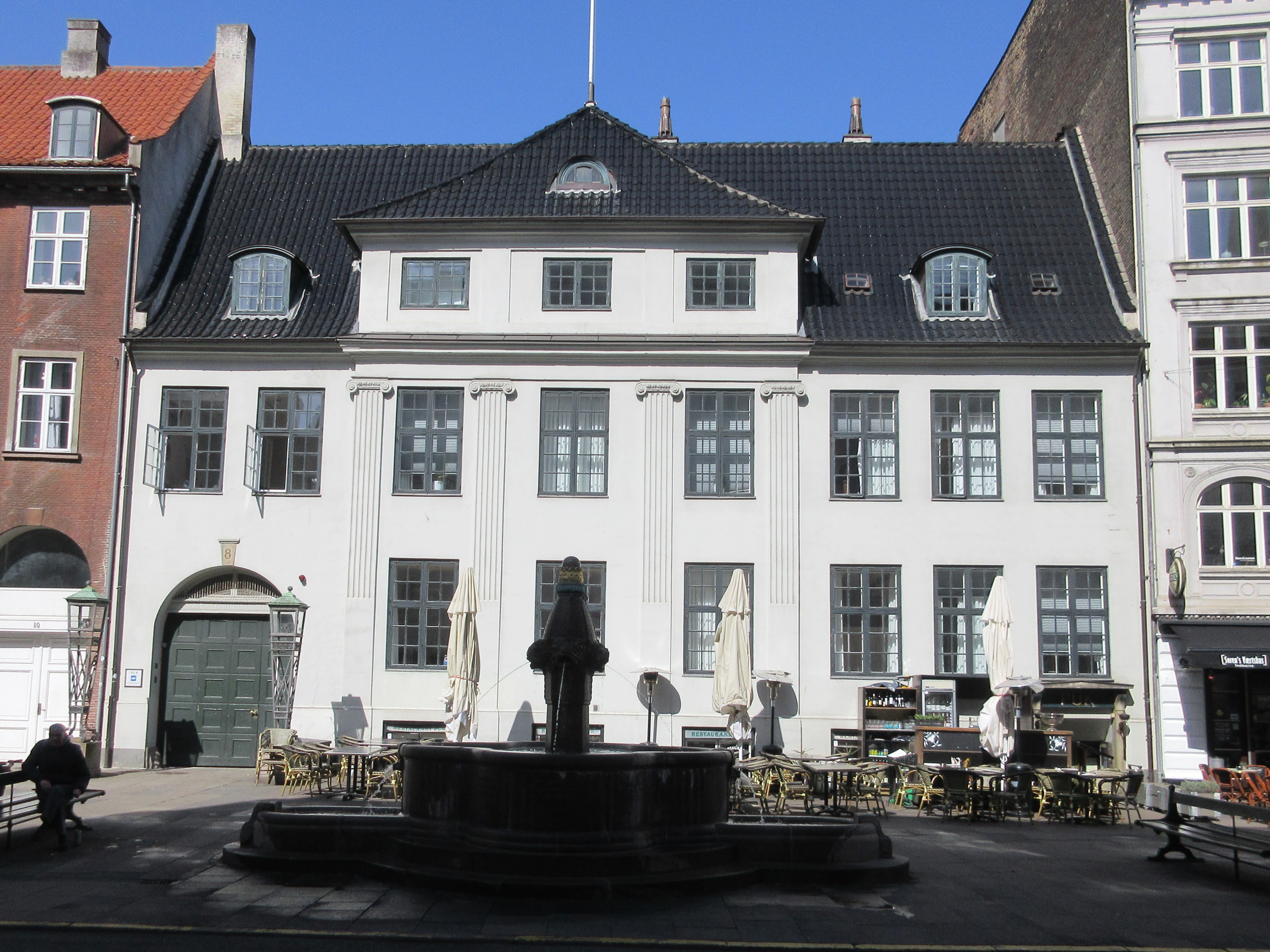
Vandkunsten 8

In 1796, Lind purchased Kamphøffner's bakery in Frederiksberg. In 1800, he bourght two parcels of land from Gustav Holck-Winterfeldt's (1774-1833) sale of the Maglegård estate in Gentofte. He constructed a farm on the land, naming it Lindslyst.

Jens Lind and his family were at the time of the 1801 census living in rented premises with fellow brewer J. D. Vogel at Strandgade 30. A black boy named Petrus was then part of the household.

He was also involved in a stamp mill in Christianshavn, a soap factory at the corner of Lavendelstræde and Halmtorvet (still active in 1811) and a combined soap and candle factory in Kongens Lyngby. On Hesselø, he had cultivated the land, constructed various buildings, established a production of Swiss cheese and was also involved in fishing.

In 1802, Lind was himself licensed as a brewer after purchasing an old brewery at Vandkunsten 8. In 1803 to 1808, he moved the brewery activities to a new building in Kompagnistræde on the other side of the block and converted the building on Vandkunsten into a stately townhouse.

On 15 December 1802, he also acquired the rxtensive holdings of the fideikommis at Vordingborg on auction for 600,000 rigsdaler. They comprised Iselingen (with Marienberg and Snertingegård, Kosenfeldt (with Aunø, Nygaards Windmill, Vordingborg Færgegaard and the Ørslev skovridergaard estate (with Kastrup og Ørslev kirketiender) as well as Ørslev, Køng og Sværdborg 'kongetiender. On 18 December 1804, he sold Iselingen, Ørslev skovridergaard as well as Ørslev kirke- and kongetiende to Hans Henrik Peter Reiersen (a younger brother of Niels Lunde Reiersen) for 420,000 rigsdaler. Rosenfeldt, Aunø and Nygaard Windmill, Vordingborg Færgegaard as well as Kastrup and Sværdborg kirketiende/kongetiende was at the same time sold to Frederik Hoppe.

== Contribution to the Danish privateer fleet ==
In September 1807, Jens Lind & partners acquired the brig Christine Henriette, a French-built merchant ship, and presented her to the state for converting and equipping as a privateer of 28 cannon. Jens Lind and partners also invested in another three privateers being equipped at Helsingør by a younger namesake of Jens Lind. On completion of her refit Christine Henriette was renamed Admiral Juel, which the British Royal Navy captured in a notable single-ship action on 2 March 1808.

== Vordingborg, 1808–21 ==
In 1808, he purchased Hulemose Nygård at Vordingborg. The estate comprised a couple of watermills. Lind constructed a paper mill, an oil mill and a soap factory on the site. He constructed and adapted some ten new buildings for his ventures.

On 6 January 1816, Lind purchased approximately two hectares of land (40 tønder) that had previously belonged to the Iselinggen estate from Markus Giøe in Vordingborg as well as the right to construct a windmill on the land. Virdingborg Mill, a smock mill, was subsequently constructed on the site. Its value was on 25 September 1818 assessed at 11,000 rigsdaler.

In 1813, he was created a Knight in the Order of the Dannebrog.

== See also ==
- Caspar Henrik Wolfsen
