= Iselingen =

Manor house and estate in southeastern Denmark

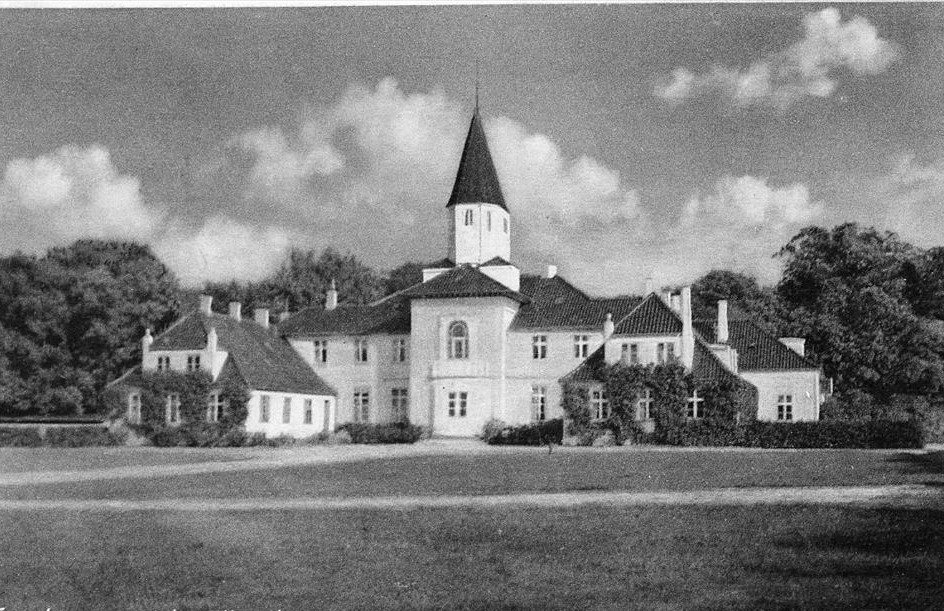
- Vintage photo of the main building
- Interactive map of the Iselingen area

General information
- Architectural style: Historicism
- Location: Vordingborg Municipality, Denmark
- Coordinates: 55°0′58″N 11°55′38″E
- Construction started: 1802
- Renovated: 1869–74

Design and construction
- Architect: Vilhelm Dahlerup

Iselingen is a manor house and estate located close to Vordingborg on the southern part of Zealand in southeastern Denmark. It takes its name after the Swiss-born merchant Reinhard Iselin who established it in the 1770s. The current main building was completed a hundred years later to design by Vilhelm Dahlerup.

== History ==
=== The Iselin family ===
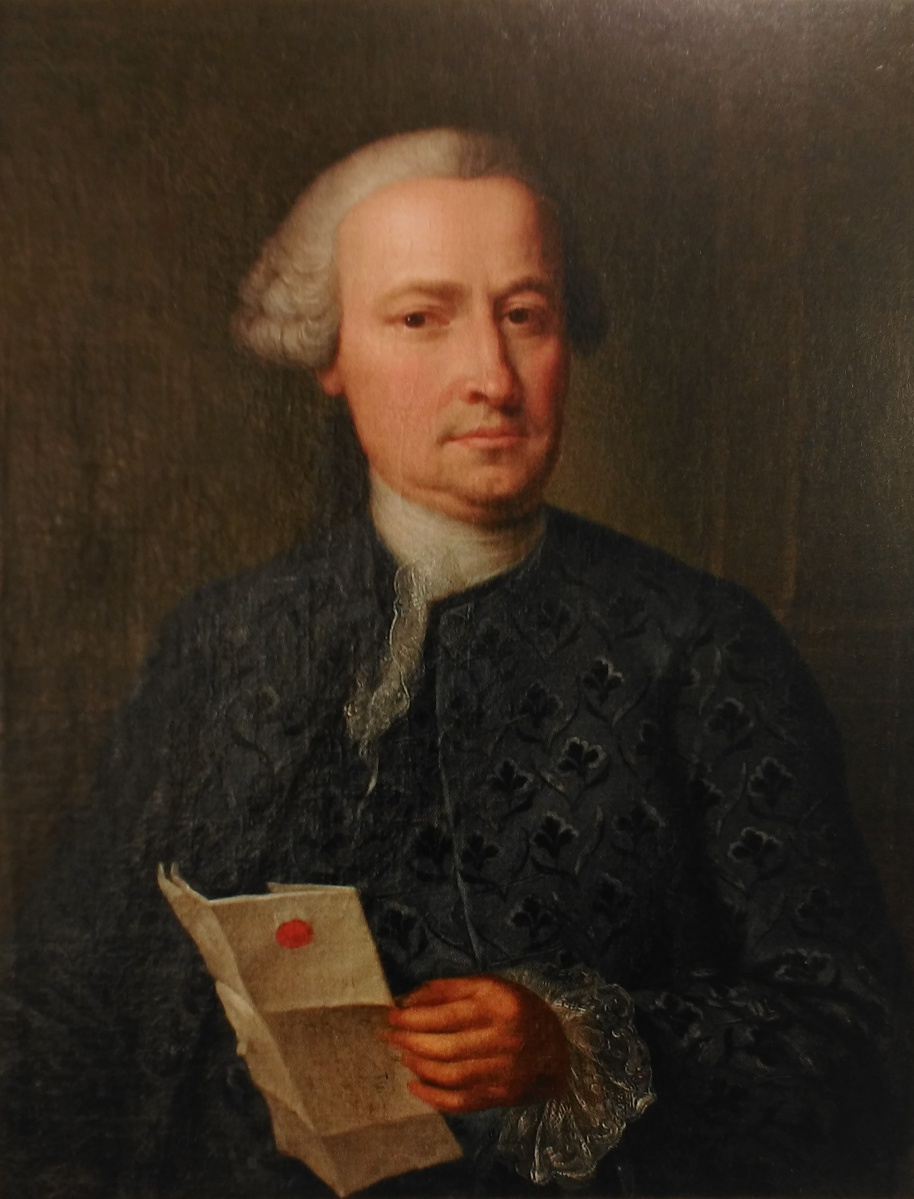
Reinhard Iselin painted by Georg Mathias Fuchs, 1766

Iselingen was created when the former Vordingborg Cavalry District was divided into 12 estates and sold in auction by the crown in 1774. One of them was the former Vordingborg Castle. The castle was a ruin but the land and its tenant farms were acquired by the merchant Reinhard Iselin who gave it the name Iselingen. He also acquired one of the other estates, Vordingborg Castle's former home farm (Vordingborg Ladegård), which was named Rosenfeldt. Iselin was ennobled with title of baron in 1776. When he died in 1781, his widow Anna Elisabeth Iselin née Fanritius founded Stamhuset Iselingen for their oldest daughter Marie Margrethe Iselin. Rosenfeldt was also turned into a stamhus and passed on to the younger daughter Anna Elisabeth Iselin. The legal effect of a stamhus was that the estate could not be sold or divided between several heirs. Datteren Marie Margrethe was married to Christian Frederik Ernst Rantzau but the couple was—highly unusually for the time—divorced in 1793. In 1802, she began the construction of a new main building at a site located to the northeast of the old castle ruin.

In 1803, Stamhuset Iselingen was dissolved and replaced by a family trust (fideikommis). The estate was then sold to ship captain Jens Lind.

=== Aagaard and Hammerich ===
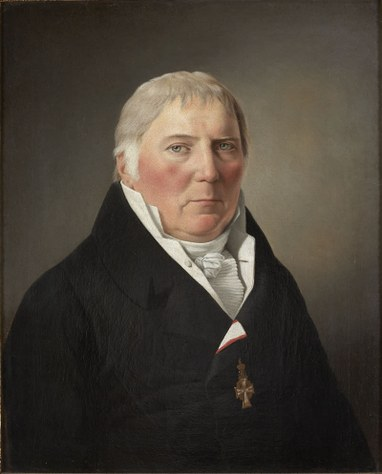
Just Michael Aagaard

After about a year, Lind sold Iselingen to district manager (amtsforvalter) H. H. P. Reiersen who shortly thereafter sold it to a consortium from Copenhagen consisting of Just Michael Aagaard, Peder Bech, Iver Qvistgaard and Hans Wassard. Aagaard became the sole owner of Iselingen in 1806. In 1810, he sold the farm Marienlyst to Wassard. It was at the same time incorporated as an independent manor.

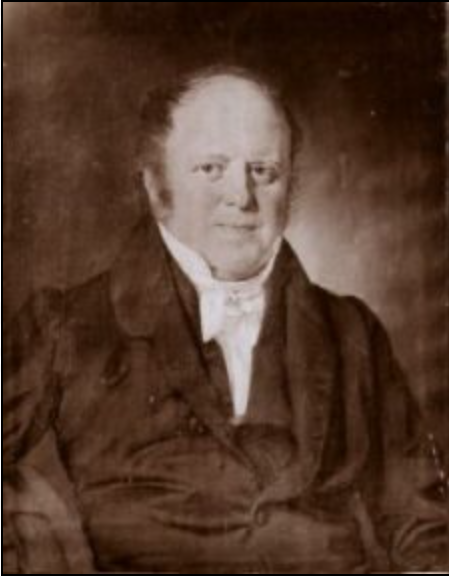
Holger Aagaard

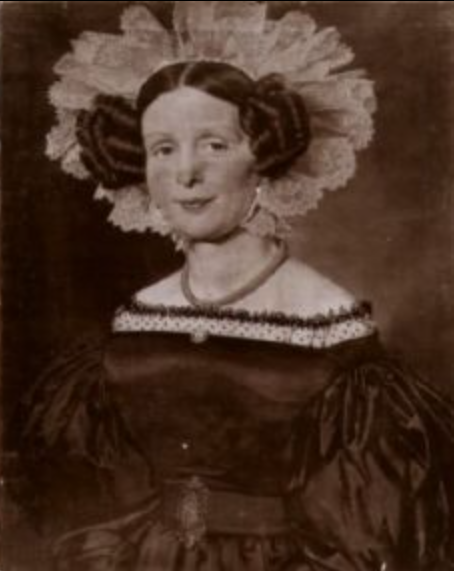
Marie Aagaard, mée Koës

Aagaard offered his son Holger Halling Aagaard to become manager of the estate. Recently engaged to 18-year old Marie Koës, he consulted his fiancé on the matter and she responded with a "Yes let's move to Iselingen, then I can have a large garden with lots of flowers and strawberries!". Holger Halling Aagaard managed the estate with great skill and inherited it in 1819. He owned Iselingen until 1866 and it won a reputation for being the most well-run estate in the country. He was very interested in both art and science and socialized with many of the most prominent figures of his day. His visitors at Iselingen included the Ørsted brothers, Grundtvig, Bertel Thorvaldsen, Adam Oehlenschläger and Christian Winther.

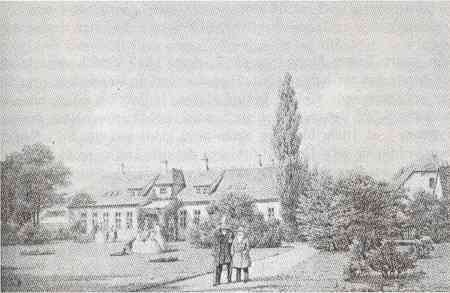
Iselingen in the 1860s

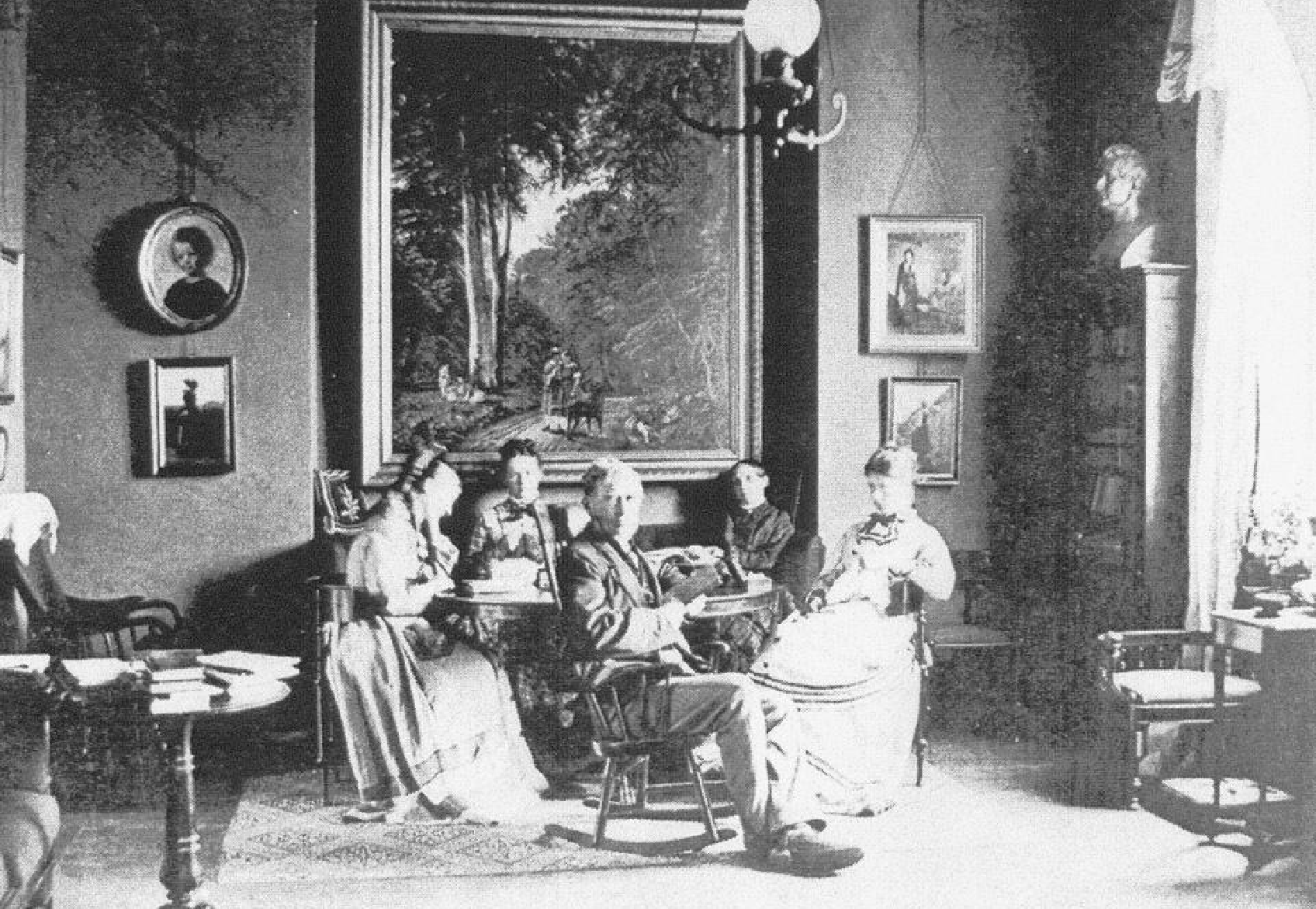
Martin Hammerich at Iselingen with P. C. Skovgaard's painting A Beech Wood in May Near Iselingen Manor seen on the wall

Holger Aagaard's son, Georg Aagaard, a National Liberal politician who was a member of the Constituent Assembly that prepared the Danish constitution of 1849, died before his father. Iselingen was therefore passed on to Holger Aagaard's son-in-law Martin Hammerich, a scholar specializing in Norse linguistics, culture, history. His home at Iselingen became a meeting place for many of the most prominent Nordic intellectuals of the time.

Martin Hammerich's son Johannes Hammerich inherited Iselingen in 1881.

=== Later history ===
In 1812 Johannes Hammerich sold Iselingen to Carl Moresco. In 1918, Iselingen changed hands again when the estate was acquired by Th. Wessel. He sold it to P. Lind in 1823. His daughter Elly Bille Hansen inherited the estate in 1945. After the death of her husband Ove Morton Middelboe Bille Hansen (1877-1957) in 1957, she ceded it to their daughter Tove, Countess of Ahlefeldt–Laurvig. She was married to Christian Preben Lauritz greve Ahlefeldt-Laurvigen (1924-2009), son of Frederik 'Fritz' greve Ahlefeldt-Laurvigen (1887-1968) and Gudrun Dorothea Wilhjelm (1896-1981).

Iselingen was acquired by Niels Otto Hansen on 1 January 1997.

== Architecture ==
The main building is from 1792 and was partly built with materials from Vordingborg Castle Ruin. The building was adapted in 1874 under supervision of Jens Vilhelm Dahlerup and Fr. Bøttger. It consists of a two-storey main wing flanked by two one-storey side wings. The tower with spire was added in 1920.

== Today ==
The estate is today owned by Niels Otto Hansen. It covers a total area of 526 hectares of which 290 hectares is farmland and 145 hectares is woodland. The garden covers five hectares.

== In culture ==
- Iselingen was used as a location in the 1953 film Vi som går køkkenvejen.

== List of owners ==
- ( -1774) The Crown
- (1774-1781) Reinhard Iselin
- (1781) Anna Elisabeth Iselin née Fabritius-Tengnagel
- (1781-1793) Christian Frederik Ernst Rantzau
- (1793-1803) Marie Margrethe Iselin, gift Rantzau
- (1803-1804) Jens Lind
- (1804) H.H.P. Reiersen
- (1804-1806) Peder Bech/Iver Qvistgaard/ Wassard/Just Michael Aagaard
- (1806-1819) Just Michael Aagaard
- (1819-1866) Holger Halling Aagaard
- (1866-1881) Martin Hammerich
- (1881-1905) Anna Hammerich née Mathea Aagaard
- (1905-1912) Johannes Hammerich
- (1912-1918) Carl Moresco
- (1918-1923) Th. Wessel
- (1923-1945) P. Lind
- (1945-1958) E. Bille-Hansen
- (1958- ) Tove Ahlefeldt-Laurvig
- (1996–present) Niels Otto Hansen

== See also ==
- Avnøgård
