= Georg Mathias Fuchs =

German-born Danish painter

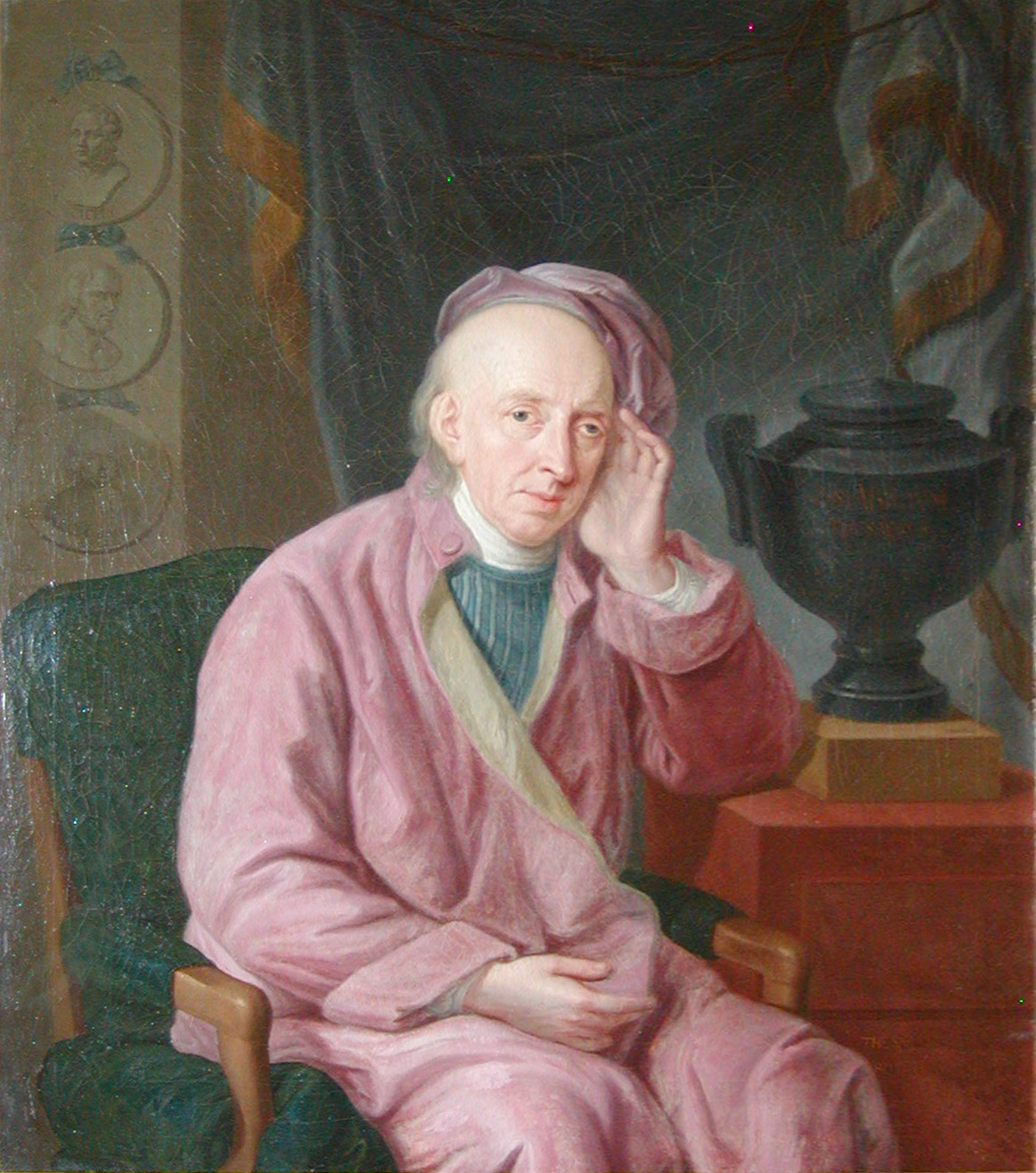
Portrait of Bolle Willum Luxdorph, Danish poet and historian

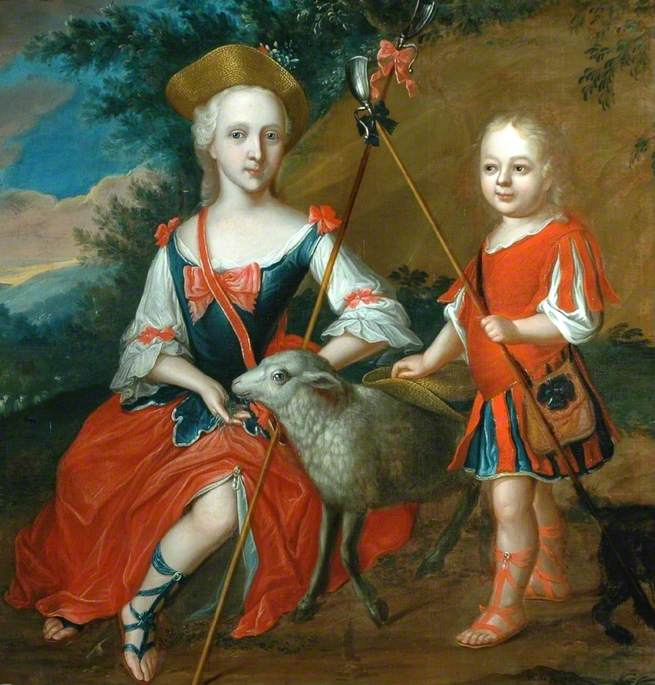
Boy and Girl Dressed as a Shepherd and a Shepherdess

Georg Mathias Fuchs (9 October 1719 – 5 April 1797) was a German-born Danish portrait and history painter.

== Biography ==
He was born in Regensburg, where his father was the custodian of the Trinitarian church. He spent six years apprenticed to the historical and decorative painter, Jacopo Amigoni, in Venice. After leaving there in 1747, he made his way north, through Vienna, and arrived in Copenhagen in 1753. The following year, he was engaged to perform decorative work at Fredensborg Castle. He also began attending the Royal Danish Academy of Fine Arts and won a silver medal there in 1755. He failed to win the competition for a gold medal in 1756. Later that year, he married the daughter of an innkeeper.

In 1768, he became a drawing teacher for cadets at the Royal Danish Military Academy and, shortly after, at the Naval Academy, where he taught until his death. This position was apparently obtained through an arrangement with an artist named Vitus Monrad (1738–1789), with whom he shared his salary, but the details are unclear. He was granted Danish citizenship in 1776. Four years later, he applied for a professorship at the Academy, but was not accepted on the grounds that he was not an artist of the "first merit".

Although primarily interested in history painting, he spent most of his career doing portraits and decorative work. His portraits were only moderately successful, but his decorative paintings, rooted in Italian influences, were very popular. He was best known for his overdoors and, for a time, had few serious competitors. Several well-known architects came to him first.

He also created some genre scenes, many of which are documented by an auction catalogue (1787) for the estate of Otto Thott. Fuchs died in Copenhagen in 1797. In 1798, his family auctioned off numerous genre and figure paintings, also documented by a catalogue. Many of the works listed in both are unaccounted for.
