= Reinhard Iselin =

Danish merchant, shipowner and industrialist (1714–1781)

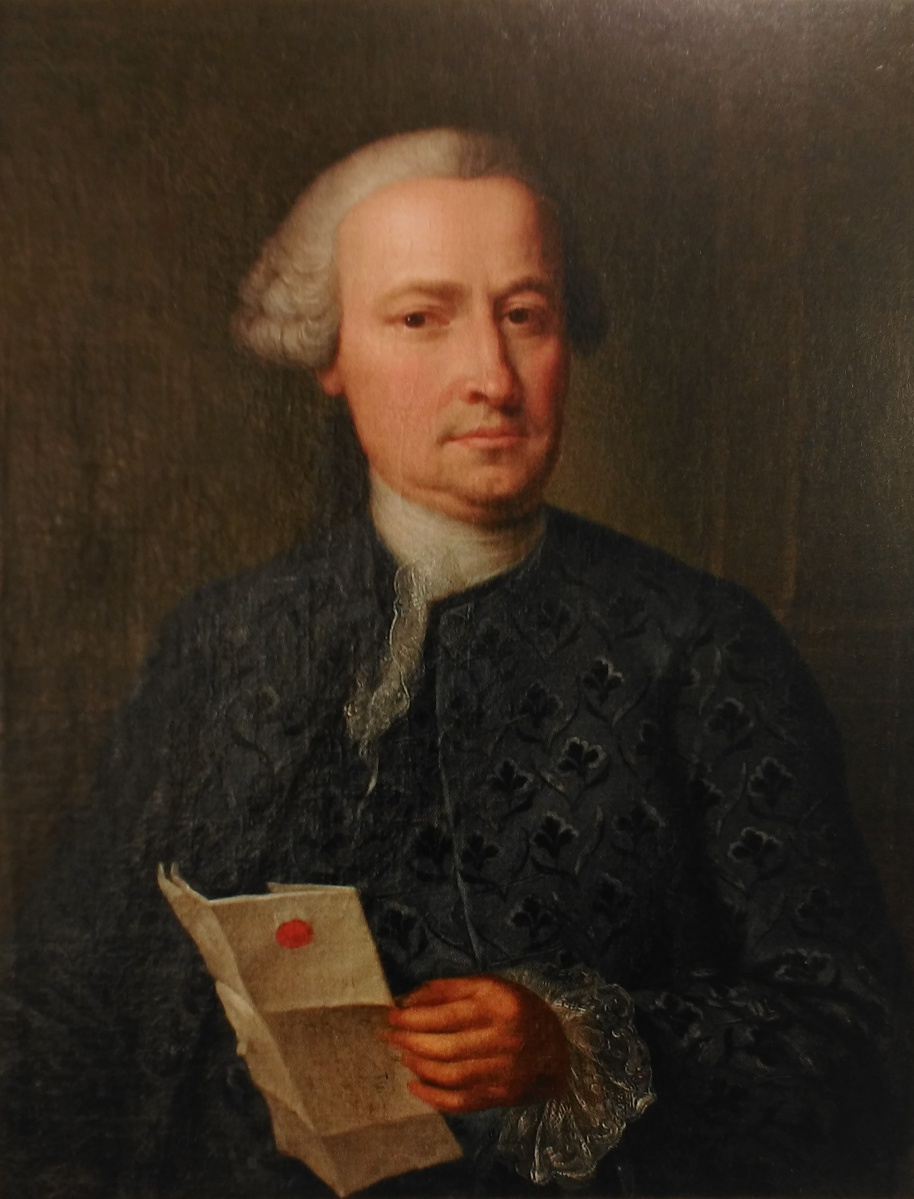
- Born: 4 August 1714; Basel, Switzerland
- Died: 10 April 1781 (aged 66); Copenhagen, Denmark
- Occupation: Merchant
- Awards: Knight of the Dannebrog

Reinhard Iselin (4 August 1714 – 10 April 1781) was a Danish merchant, shipowner and industrialist who founded Reinhard Iselin & Co. in Copenhagen in 1749. The company completed 65 expeditions to the Danish West Indies. Iselin was also active in the Danish Asiatic Company where he served on the board of directors from 1759 to 1769. He owned Iselingen and Rosenfeldt at Vordingborg. He was raised to the peerage with the rank of baron in 1776 but the title died with him since both his sons died as infants.

== Early life and education ==
Born in Basel, Iselin was the son of brazier Johan Ludvig Iselin (1676–1745) and his second wife Margaretha Schrotberger (died 1755). Iselin completed an apprenticeship before travelling first to Cologne and then Copenhagen in 1740,

== Shipping ==
In Copenhagen, Iselin initially worked for Fabritius & Wever, a trading house owned by Michael Fabritius and Johan Frederik Wæver.

In 1749 he established his own trading house under the name Reinhard Iselin & Co. which soon grew to be one of the most important in Copenhagen. Iselin was a major shareholder in the Danish Asiatic Company and several of the other chartered companies. From 1759 to 1769, he served as director of the Danish Asiatic Company. He was also active in the Danish Africa Company.

A stroke forced Icelin to retire from the company in 1777. It was then continued by his wife until her death. The firm owned four ships in 1779. Iselin & Co. completed a total of 65 expeditions to the Danish West Indies.

=== Ships ===
Name	Image	Owned	Type	Built	Comments	Reference
Prinsesse Louise		1777–1779	Hækbåd	1756 in Haderslev or Flensburg	Name later changed to Baronesse Iselin	Ref
Debora		–1761	Brigantine /Snau	Before 1761	Sold to the Danish Asiatic Company	Ref
Anna Elisabeth		?–1761	?	Before 1761		Ref
Elisabeth		1776 – c. 1784	?	1776	Jørgen Kylling was captain of the ship in c. 1776	Ref

== Industrial enterprises ==
Iselin was also involved in several industrial enterprises. In 1754, he was one of the founders of a textile mill. In the same year, he obtained a royal license to establish a calico textile manufactury at the Christiansholm estate. He was also involved in a tannery (acquired in 1772, located in Adelgade) and a sugar refinery. In Norway, Iselin held a 40% stake in Froland's iron works at Arendal.

== Property and honours ==
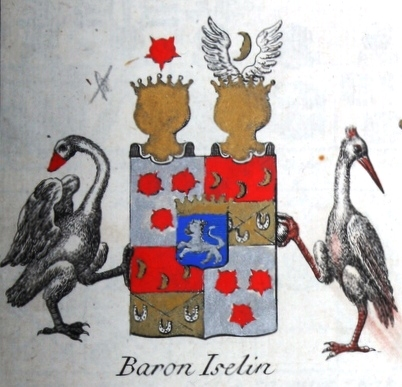
Reinhard Iselin's coat of arms

Iselin was given the title of etatsråd in 1766 and konferensråd in 1769. He owned Rosendal and Rosenvænget at Copenhagen as well as a country house (now Gramlille) in Kongens Lyngby.

He acquired the estates Iselingen, Rosenfeldt, Snertingegård and Avnø at Vordingborg from the state when Vordingborg Cavalry District was sold in auction in 1774. In 1776, Iselin was ennobled with the title of baron (friherre).

== Personal life and legacy ==
Iselin married his former employer Michael Fabritius' daughter Anna Elisabeth on 2 February 1772 in the German Reformed Church in Copenhagen. They had four children. Their two sons died as infants. Their daughter Marie Margrethe (Mimi) (1753–1814) married Christian Frederik (Friedrich) Ernst Rantzau von Rantzau (1747–1806). Their daughter Lisa married Antoine de Bosc de la Calmette.

Iselin died on 10 April 1781. His widow married Johan Frederik Classen in 1783. In accordance with his wishes, she established two estates (stamhuse) for their daughters in 1781, Iselingen and Rosenfeldt (named after the family's home town, Rosenfeld in Württemberg). Anna Elisabeth (née Fabritius) married Antoine de Bosc de la Calmette.
