= Oxholm =

Oxholm is a surname. Notable people with the surname include:

- Frederik Oxholm (1801–1871), Danish military officer
- Kitty Oxholm, American politician
- Oscar O'Neill Oxholm (various people)
- Peter Lotharius Oxholm (1753–1827), Danish army officer
- Sophie Oxholm (1848–1935), Danish noblewoman
- Tom Erik Oxholm (born 1959), Norwegian speed skater

== See also ==
- Oxhorn
- Oxenholme
