= Lienau =

Lienau is a German language habitational surname for someone from any of various places called Lienow. Notable people with the name include:

- Detlef Lienau (1818–1887), German architect
- Jacob August Lienau (1854–1906), American architect
- Marianne Lienau (1935–2021), German presenter, radio journalist and contributing editor
- Robert Lienau (1838–1920), German music publisher
