= Oscar O'Neill Oxholm (diplomat) =

Danish diplomat and art collector (1889–1949)

- Born: 7 August 1889; Copenhagen, Denmark
- Died: 26 March 1949 (aged 59); Norway

Oscar Ludvig Fritz Adolf O'Neill Oxholm (7 August 1889 – 26 March 1949) was a Danish diplomat who served as minister to China from 1932 to 1939 and was an art collector.

== Early life ==
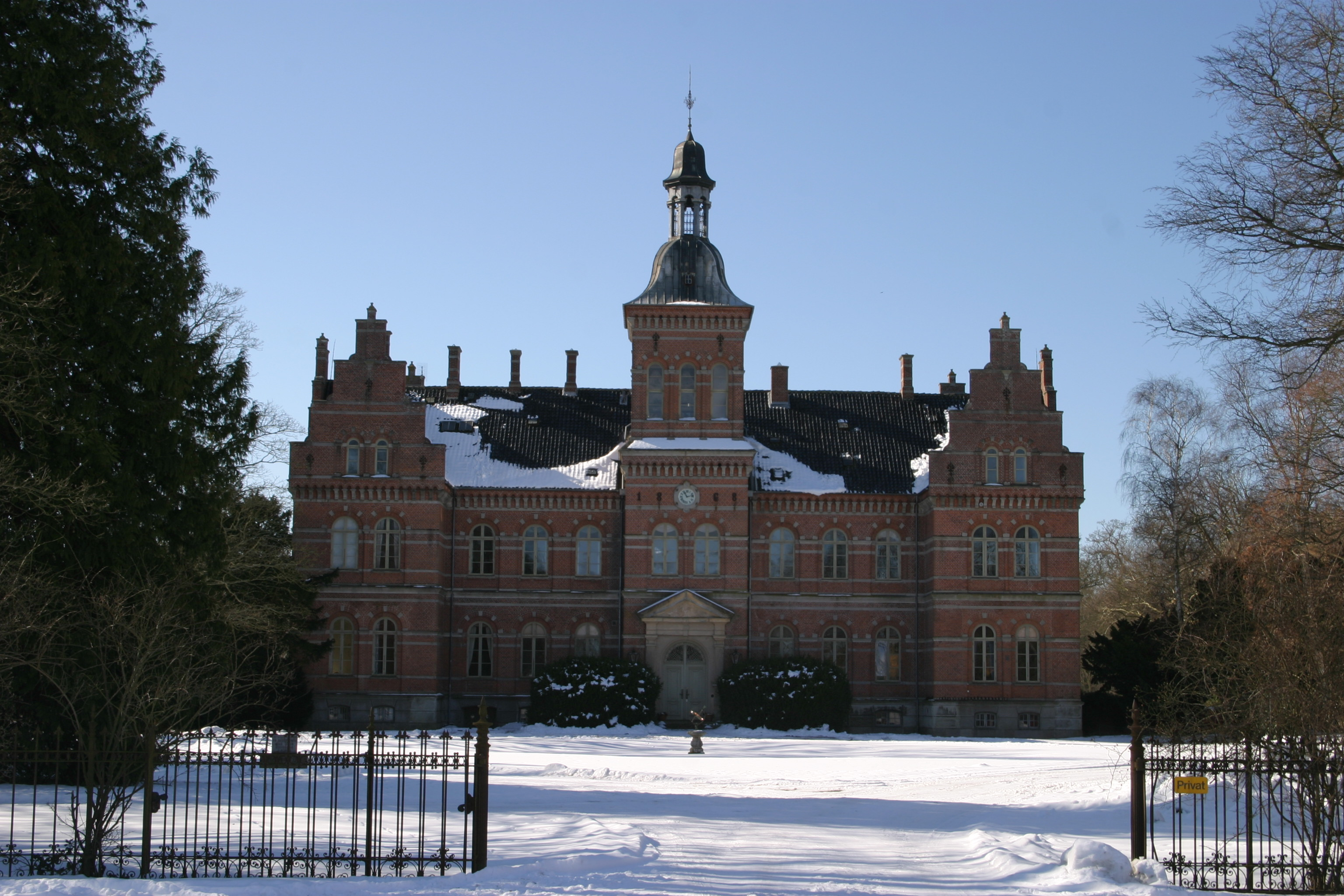
Rosenfeldt Manor near Vordingborg, the Oxholm family estate

Oxholm was born on 7 August 1889 in Copenhagen, Denmark. He was the eldest son of Countess Wilhelmine Wanda Theodora Holstein-Holsteinborg (b. 1867), and Oscar Siegfred Christian O'Neill Oxholm (1855–1926), a courtier, chamberlain, and master of ceremonies.

His father was the youngest son of Oscar O'Neill Oxholm, the prominent Danish military officer, chamberlain and landowner. His maternal grandparents were Council President of Denmark Ludvig Holstein-Holsteinborg, 7th Count of Holsteinborg, and the former Bodild Joachimine "Mimi" Zahrtmann (the daughter of Navy Minister Admiral C.C. Zahrtmann).

Following the death of his aunt Sophie Oxholm (née Bech) in 1935, Oxholm inherited the heavily indebted Rosenfeldt Manor near Vordingborg, some 90 km south of Copenhagen.

== Career ==
In 1932, Oxholm succeeded Minister Henrik Kauffmann as the minister to China following the 1928 decision by Generalissimo Chiang Kai-shek and the Nationalist government to move the capital of China from Beijing to Nanjing. The Danish government wanted to move the Danish Legation from Beijing (then known as Peking) to Shanghai and Oxholm moved there in 1935 (after spending his first three years in Beijing he was the Danish envoy). On 1 November 1935, the Royal Danish Legation was officially opened in the Bund (where the Danish Consulate General had been located since 1931). After staying at the Cathay Hotel in Shanghai, Oxholm and his family moved into a villa in Hongqiao.

In July 1937, the Japanese attacked China and Beijing and Tianjin fell into the hands of the Japanese and Shanghai fell in November. The Nanjing Massacre took place the following month after which Japanese forces also occupied the capital of Nationalist China. As the Japanese army approached Nanjing, the Nationalist Government moved west, first to Wuhan, then to Chongqing where new government headquarters were set up in 1938. During all of this, Oxholm and a small group of Danish diplomats stayed in Shanghai including Mogens Melchoir, Legation Counsellor and Consul-General Scheel and Legation Secretary and Vice-Counsul Bøgh Anderson.

In 1939, Oxholm was transferred from Shanghai to Oslo (again taking over for Kauffmann) and was succeeded by Hialmar Collin, even though Shanghai was occupied by the Japanese, and served as Envoy in Shanghai, accredited to the Nationalist Government in Chongqing.

== Personal life ==
Oxholm was married to Inge Sigrid Kirsten Blechingberg (1898–1984), a daughter of Otto Carl Frederik Blechingberg and the former Sigrid Hilda Sofie Weber. Inge had previously been married to Count Carl Magnus Mauritz Armfelt. Together, they were the parents of:

- Elsa Sonja Sigrid Oxholm (1929–1991), who inherited Rosenfeldt and married chamberlain Erik Tillisch.

While in China, Oxholm and his wife Inge acquired a large set of four "Jataka Tales" thangkas of Buddhas which were later acquired by Countess Wava Armfeldt, a lady in waiting to the Queen of Denmark.

Oxholm died on 26 March 1949 after he collapsed during a walk at his skiing cottage in Norway by Røa.
