= Oscar O'Neill Oxholm (landowner) =

Danish military officer, chamberlain and landowner (1809–1871)

- Photography of Oxholm by Jens Petersen
- Born: 28 April 1809
- Died: 15 October 1871 (aged 62)
- Father: Peter Lotharius Oxholm

Oscar O'Neill Oxholm (28 April 1809 – 15 October 1871) was a Danish military officer, chamberlain and landowner. He owned Rosenfeldt Manor at Vordingborg from 1841.

== Early life ==
He was the son of Ann O'Neill (1796–1844) and Peter Lotharius Oxholm. His father served as governor-general of the Danish West Indies from 1815 to 1816 who participated in the Battle of Køge in 1807. His mother was the daughter of a plantation owner on Saint Croix. Ann and Peter had 12 children, of which 8 survived to adulthood. Oscar was the youngest of their sons.

His father owned a mansion of the corner of Sankt Annæ Plads and Amaliegade (which was acquired by King Frederick VI in 1826 who put it at the disposal of Prince William of Hesse-Kassel, who lived there until his death in 1867), as well as the St. George Hill, Sally's Fancy, and Hope plantations on Saint Croix.

== Career ==
Rosenfeldt Manor, 1873

Oxholm began his career in the Royal Danish Army at the Foot Guards. In 1848, he was freed from service to serve as adjudant for Frederick VII. He reached the rank of Major-General and was appointed to chamberlain.

On 10 June 1841, Oxholm was made a knight of the Order of the Dannebrog. Later that month, on 24 June, he and his siblings were given letters patent which admitted their family to the Danish nobility.

Oxholm purchased Rosenfeldt Manor at Vordingborg in 1841. He constructed the new main building, two farm buildings and 20 fæstegårde. Designed by Henrik Steffens Sibbern, the main building was built from 1868 to 1870.

== Personal life ==
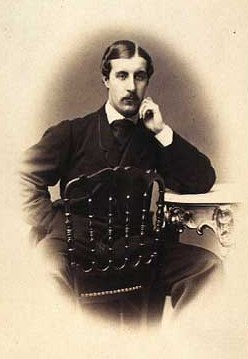
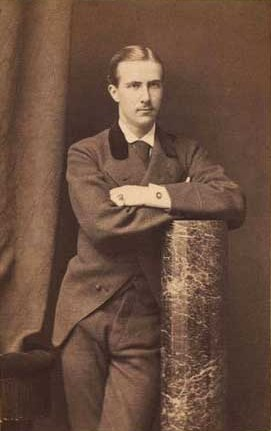
His eldest son, Carl (left), and youngest son, Oscar (right)

Oxholm married the Irish Adelaide Maria O'Kelly (1817–1882) in 1842 in Paris. They had five children, three of whom survived to adulthood:

- Carl Arthur O'Neill Oxholm (1843–1914), who married Sophie Marguerite Bech (1848–1935), a daughter of Danish diplomat Edward Bech.
- Fritz Johan Georg O'Neill Oxholm (1850–1878), who died unmarried.
- Oscar Siegfred Christian O'Neill Oxholm (1855–1926), a courtier, chamberlain, and master of ceremonies who married Countess Fritze Wilhelmine Wanda Theodora Holstein, a daughter of Prime Minister Ludvig Holstein-Holsteinborg.

He died on 15 October 1871 and is buried at Kastrup Cemetery. As his eldest son died without issue in 1914, the Rosenfeldt estate passed to his daughter-in-law Sophie, and following her death in 1935, his grandson, Oscar O'Neill Oxholm, who served as the Danish ambassador to China from 1932 to 1939.
