= Edward Bech =

Danish-American industrialist and consul (1812–1873)

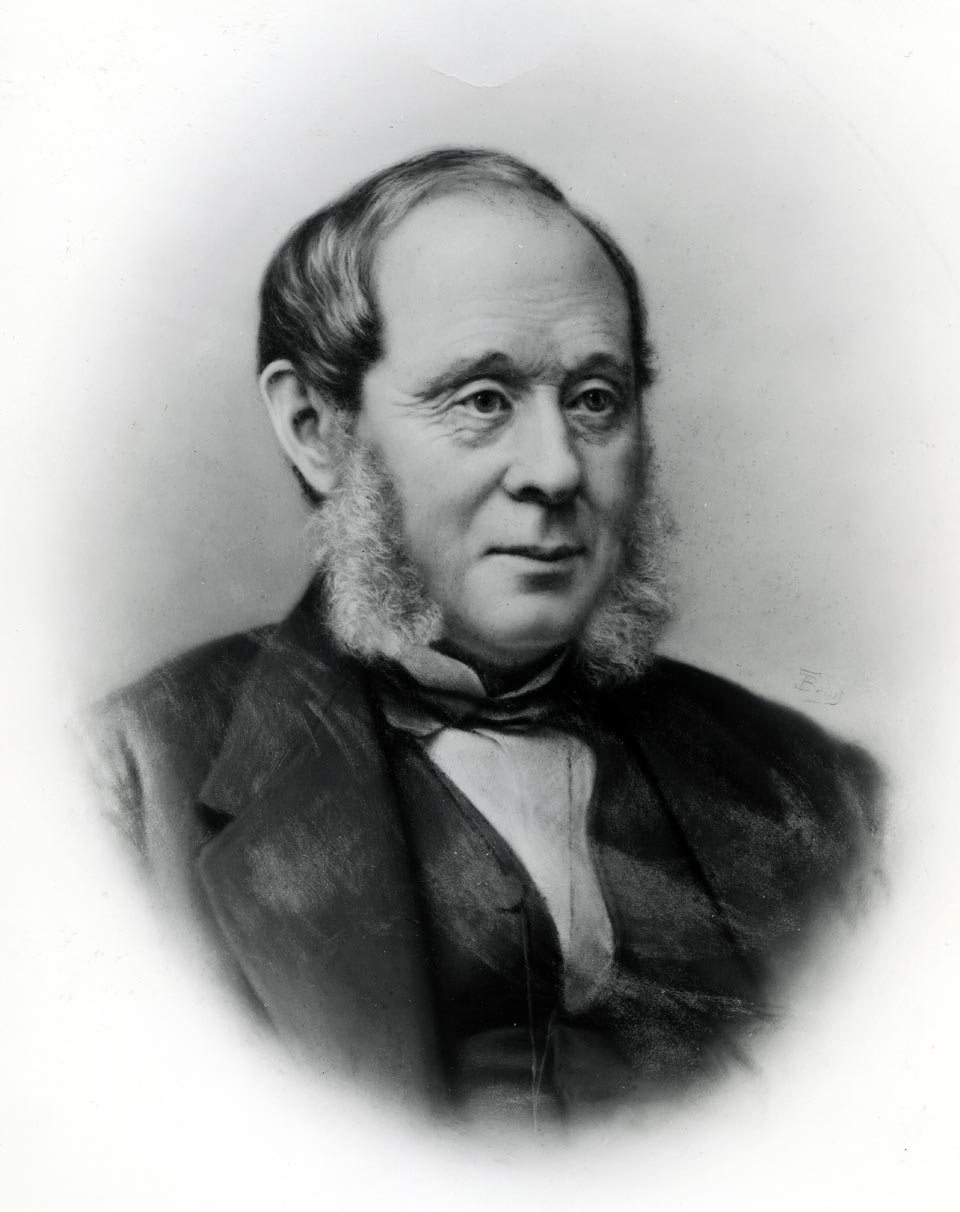

Danish Consul in New York
- In office 1838–1858

Personal details
- Born: Edvard Bech; May 4, 1812 Copenhagen, Denmark
- Died: July 9, 1873 (aged 61) Stuttgart, Baden-Württemberg
- Spouse: Elizabeth Hossack Braëm (m. 1846)
- Relations: August Willads Bech (brother)
- Children: 4, including Sophie
- Parent(s): Ellen Sophie Magdalene Meyer Bech; Jørgen Peter Bech
- Education: University of Copenhagen

Edward Bech (May 4, 1812 – July 9, 1873) was a Danish diplomat and businessman who lived in the United States. His former home is now part of Marist College.

== Early life ==
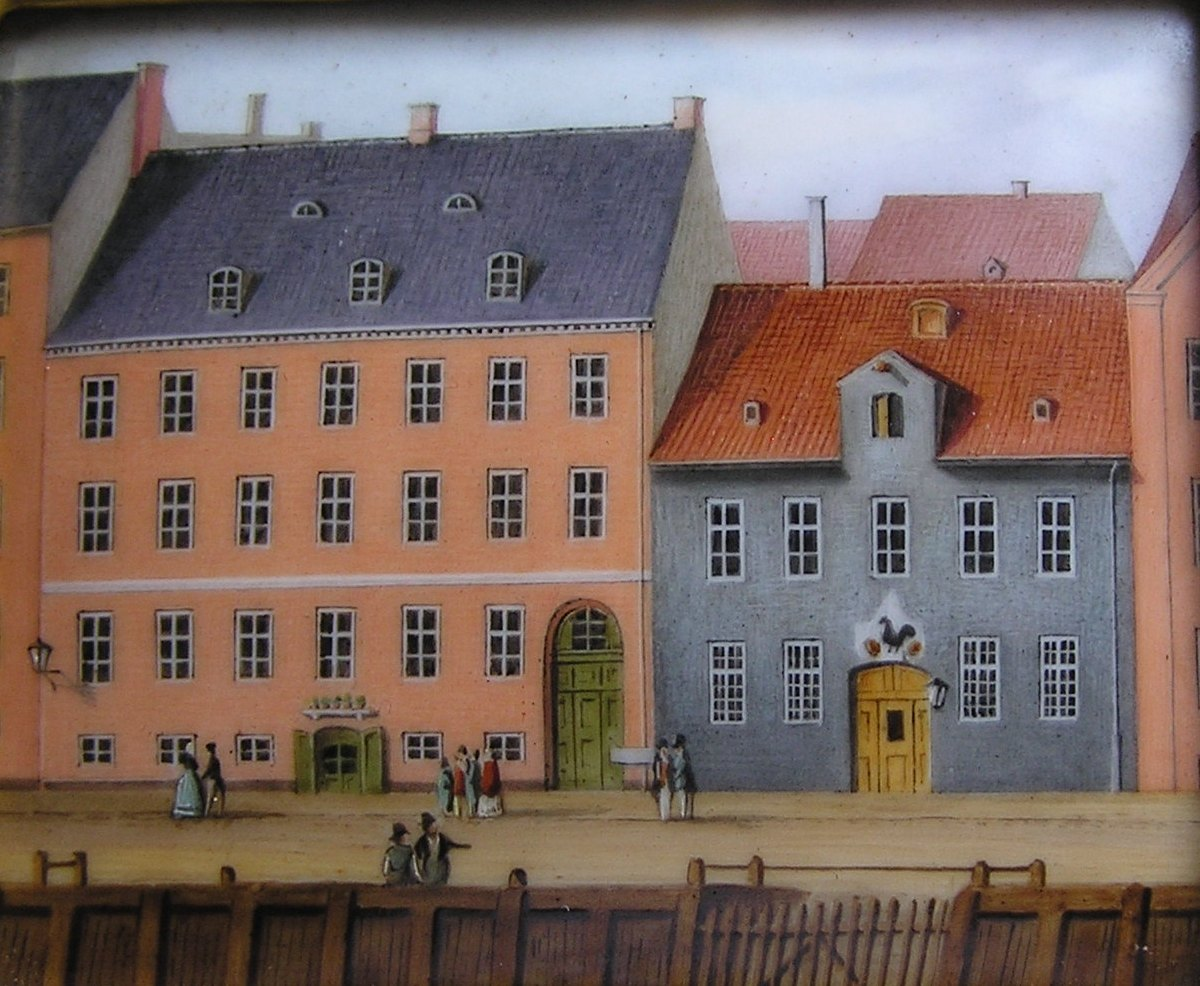
Nybrogade in Copenhagen: Bech's birthplace is the building to the right and the one to the left is where he was raised from 1816 (now No. 24).

Bech was born on May 4, 1812, in Copenhagen, Denmark. He was a son of Ellen Sophie Magdalene (née Meyer) Bech (1784–1846) and Jørgen Peter Bech (1782–1846), a prosperous Copenhagen merchant and friend of Crown Prince Frederick.The family lived at Nybrogade 24 (until 1816 in a now demolished building at No. 22) and had an estate south of Copenhagen, near the border in territory that was later absorbed into Germany.

Bech studied in Berlin and attended the University of Copenhagen before going to Lübeck for a commercial education. His younger brother was August Willads Bech, who owned Valbygård at Slagelse and Borupgård at Borup.

== Career ==
Bech immigrated to New York in 1838 becoming the Danish Consul in New York. He remained in that position for the next twenty years and was knighted by King Frederick VII on October 5, 1854.

In 1842, after working for others, Bech formed his own firm which traded in wine (where he partnered with Michael Lienau) and iron (where he worked with Joseph Tuckerman). Bech and Tuckerman invested in several joint ventures in the mid-Hudson River area. After moving to Poughkeepsie, New York in 1851, he became involved with the pig iron trade and started the Tuckerman and Bech Iron Company, a successful riverfront business that prospered with the advent of the Delaware and Hudson Canal and Railroad. Bech also became a partner in the Cunard Steamship Company.

After his father died in 1853, Edward inherited money which he used to invest in the Poughkeepsie Iron Company, eventually buying out Tuckerman's share in the business and purchasing another site further along the Hudson River where he could produce pig iron for sale to other foundries. At the time of his death he was President of the Port Henry Iron Company of Lake Champlain and senior member of the firm of Edward Bech & Co of New York City.

== Personal life ==
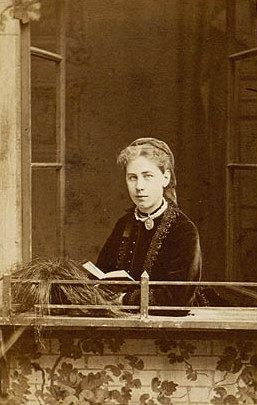
His daughter, Sophie Marguerite Oxholm

On September 11, 1846, Bech was married to Canadian born Charlotte Elizabeth McCarty (née Hossack) Braëm (1808–1900), the widow of Rudolph Gothard Sighart Braëm. From her first marriage, she was the mother of two sons, the Danish consul Henri Monad Braem (who married Emily Maria Forbes Bridge, a sister-in-law of Stuyvesant LeRoy). Together, they were the parents of two daughters and two sons:

- Mary Elizabeth Bech (1847–1900), who married Count Karl Heinrich von Linden (1838–1910) in 1877; Linden served as High Chamberlin under King Charles I of Württemberg.
- Sophie Marguerite Bech (1848–1935), who married Danish nobleman Carl Arthur O'Neill Oxholm (1843–1914), eldest son of Oscar O'Neill Oxholm of Rosenfeldt Manor at Vordingborg, in 1872.
- Edward Michael Hossack Bech (1850–1862), who died young.
- George Albert Bech (1856–1890), who married Mary Stevens Strong (1855–1880), a granddaughter of John Austin Stevens, in 1879; Mary and their son, Edward Henri Peter Bech, died during childbirth. After her death, he married Julia May (1859–1954) of Baltimore, a daughter of U.S. Representative Henry May, in 1887. Her sister, Lillian, later married William Bagot, 4th Baron Bagot. After his death, Julia married William Babcock and moved away from Rosenlund.

Bech died from tuberculosis on July 9, 1873, in Stuttgart, Baden-Württemberg. His body was returned to the United States and he was buried at Poughkeepsie Rural Cemetery in a mausoleum was designed by Detlef Lienau in 1862 for Bech's eldest son Edward who died young. At his death, Bech left an estate valued at $1,837,342 of which one third went to his son George, and 1/9 each to his daughters. The remaining third was left in trust for his widow from which she received about $25,000 per year. His son George continued managing his businesses until his death in 1890.

=== Hudson River estate ===
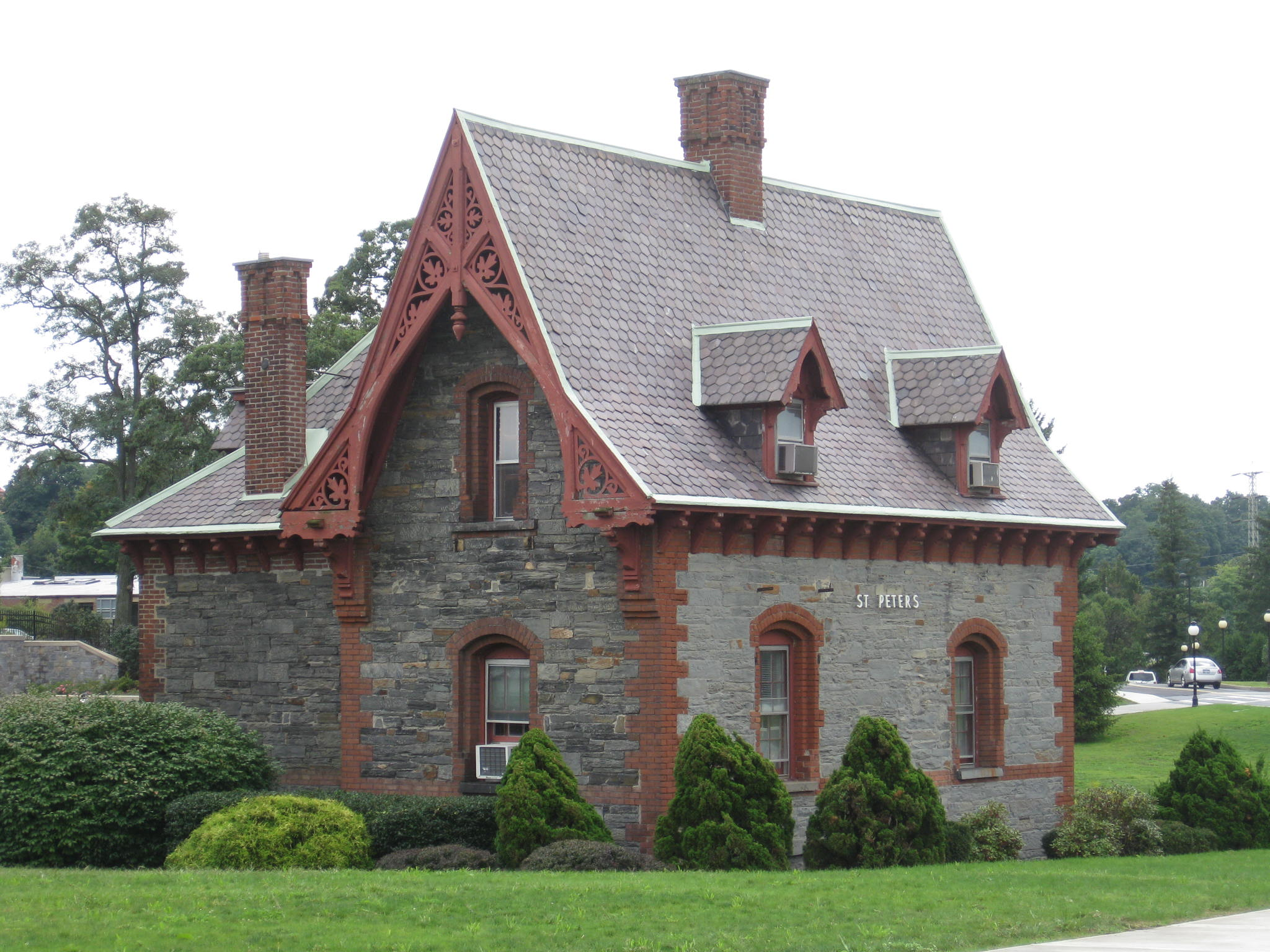
One of the buildings designed by Detlef Lienau for Bech at Rosenlund

In 1851, Bech moved his family to Poughkeepsie where they lived at 57 Market Street, across from the Court House, for nearly ten years. In 1863, the Bechs purchased a 65-acre country estate in Poughkeepsie, New York known as Hickory Grove from David Ely Bartlett, who had operated a school for the deaf on the property which formerly was the farm of Abraham Van Anden. Between 1863 and 1868, he pieced together five parcels, which the Bech's renamed Rosenlund. He hired Danish architect Detlef Lienau, the younger brother of his wine trading partner, Michael Lienau, who designed a gatehouse, gardener's cottage, carriage house, and a main house in the Gothic Revival style, but died before the main house was built.

The Rosenlund estate passed to his widow Elizabeth and, after her death in May 1900, it was willed to her son Henri, who died in Vienna in February 1900, therefore, it passed to her granddaughter, Pauline Elizabeth (née Braem) von Nauendorf (1871–1916). After the Braem estate was settled in 1905, Pauline sold Rosenlund to Brother Louis Zephiriny of the Marist Brothers in 1908, which increased their property to 150 acres (0.61 km^{2}) and eventually became Marist College.
