= Battle of Køge Bay =

Battle of Køge Bay may refer to:

- Battle of Køge Bay (1677)
- Battle of Køge Bay (1710)

== See also ==
- Battle of Køge (1807), between British and Danish land forces
