= Oscar O'Neill Oxholm =

Oscar O'Neill Oxholm may refer to:

- Oscar O'Neill Oxholm (landowner) (1809–1871), Danish military officer, chamberlain, and landowner
- Oscar O'Neill Oxholm (diplomat) (1889–1949), Danish diplomat, grandsom of the above
