= Poul Christian Stemann =

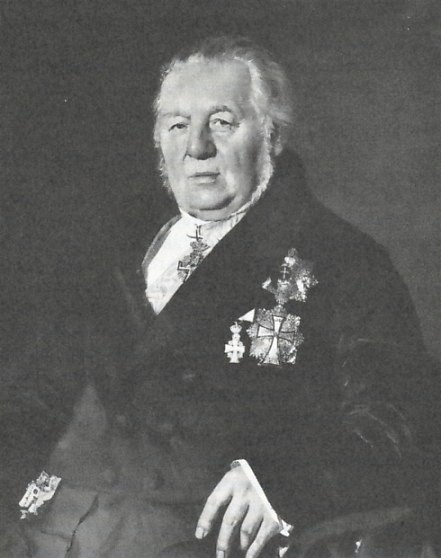

Prime minister of Denmark
- Predecessor: Otto Joachim Moltke (new office)
- Successor: Adam Wilhelm Moltke
- Born: 14 April 1764
- Died: 25 November 1855 (aged 91)

Poul Christian (von) Stemann (14 April 1764 – 25 November 1855) was a Danish state official and leading minister from 1827 to 1848.

== Early life and education ==
Born in Copenhagen, Stemann belonged to an old civil service family of German origin that has created many Danish local officials.

== Career ==
As a young man he was relatively liberal, later becoming a deep conservative. As the son of a supporter of Ove Høegh-Guldberg, his early state career was hampered for political reasons. Instead, he made himself a career in the Supreme Court besides establishing himself as a squire. Between 1798 and 1827, he was amtman (prefect) of Sorø and showed himself a very industrious, masterful and active local official who attracted the attention of King Frederick VI.

In 1827, Stemann was appointed President of Danish Chancellery (Home Office) and Minister of Juridical Affairs and from then he was for twenty years the last ”prime minister” of Danish absolutism (though not officially presiding in the State Council until 1842). His work fell in an age of growing opposition and reform demands of which he (like his royal employer) clearly disapproved. He reluctantly accepted the creation of Assemblies of Estates in the 1830s, but tried to limit their influence as much as possible, counteracting the moderate conservative wing of the government as well as concessions to the liberal opposition. To the latter Stemann stood as the reactionary, an unimaginative and authoritarian bureaucrat himself. Later historians have varied this verdict but on the whole he is still regarded as a very traditional representative of the non-enlightened absolutism regarding the squires as the foundation of the state. He was also an enemy of the Schleswig-Holstein movement but it is still discussed whether this was due to his national feelings or to his disapproval of all opposition.

During the reign of Christian VIII, Stemann continued in office but with less influence. At the fall of absolutism in March 1848, he was dismissed together with the other cabinet ministers, which marked the end of his direct political power. However, for some years he played a minor role behind the scenes as a councillor of conservative politicians.

== Property ==
He owned Benzonslund from 1791 to 1800 and Valbygård from 1805 to 1846.

== Personal life ==
He married Cathrine Elisabeth Wasserfall (1767 - 29 August 1850) in 1788. They had three children: Catharina Elisabeth Stemann (1789–1870), Christian Ludvig von Stemann (1791–1857) and Christiane Louise Stemann (1807–1837).

Political offices
Preceded by Otto Joachim Moltke	Privy Councillor of Denmark; 1842 - 1848	Succeeded by Adam Wilhelm Moltke
