= Valbygård =

Manor house near Slagelse, Denmark

General information
- Architectural style: Renaissance Revival
- Location: Slagelse Municipality, Valbygårdsvej 88B; 4200 Slagelse, Denmark
- Coordinates: 55°25′34″N 11°18′20″E
- Completed: 1855

Design and construction
- Architect: Albert Winstrup

Valbygård is a manor house and estate located four kilometres northwest of Slagelse, Denmark. Created by Joachim Castenschiold in 1874 from land that had previously belonged to Antvorskov Abbey, the estate was in 1846 acquired by August Willads Bech and has since then remained in the Bech family. The current, Renaissance Revival style main building was built for August Willads Bech in 1855. It was listed on the Danish registry of protected buildings and places in 1996. The estate covers 1,100 hectares of land.

== History ==
=== Church property and crown land ===
In the Middle Ages the land belonged to Antvorskov Abbey. The abbey was confiscated by the Crown during the Reformation and Valbygård was then turned into a royal fief. In 1703, Frederick converted Antvorskov into a countship for his mistress, Elisabeth Helene von Vieregg. When she shortly thereafter died in labour, Antvorskov was instead turned into a cavalry district.

=== Castenschiold and von Stemann ===
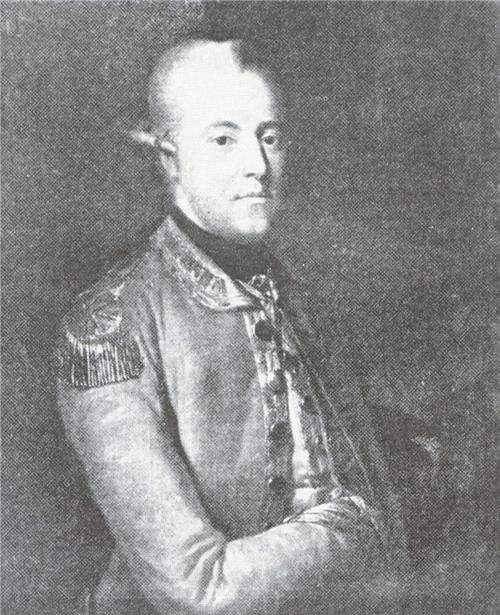
Joachim Castenschiold in 1779

In 1774, the Antvorskov Cavalry District was divided into nine manors and sold in the auction. One of them, Valbygård, which consisted of land from Wiztøgaard as well as 11 former farms in the villages of Store Valby and Vester Valby, was acquired by Joachim Melchior Holten Castenschiold. In 1776, he sold it to his older brother, Jørgen Frederik Castenschiold. He was a captain in the Crown Prince's Regiment but was in 1780 promoted to colonel and chamberlain. Jørgen Frederik Castenschiold ran into a number of obstacles in the management of his estate. In 1781, he struggled with a lack of animal feed and his livestock population was at the same time hit by decease. In 1783, the harvest failed.

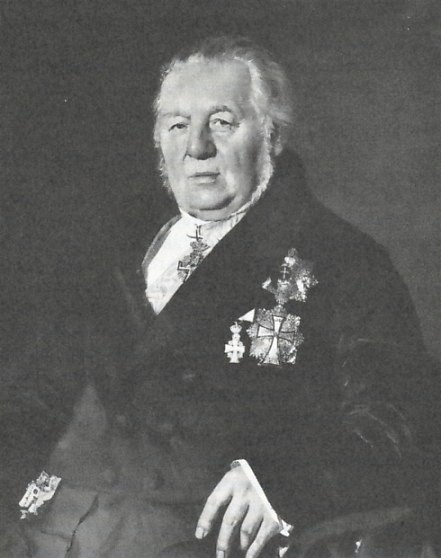
Poul Christian Stemann

In 1805, Castenschiold sold Valbygård to Poul Christian von Stemann. He had previously owned the small Benzonsdal Manor from 1791 to 1800 and was from 1802 responsible for managing the holdings of Sorø Academy. He had served as amtmand (prefect) of Sorø County since 1798 and had shown himself a very industrious, masterful and active local official who attracted the attention of King Frederick VI. He took a profound interest in the management of his estates as well as the living conditions for the peasants on them. He collaborated with the owner of Bøstrup on draining Bild Lake, thereby increasing the area of his estate.

In 1827, Stemann was appointed President of Danish Chancellery (Home Office) and Minister of Juridical Affairs-

=== The Bech family ===
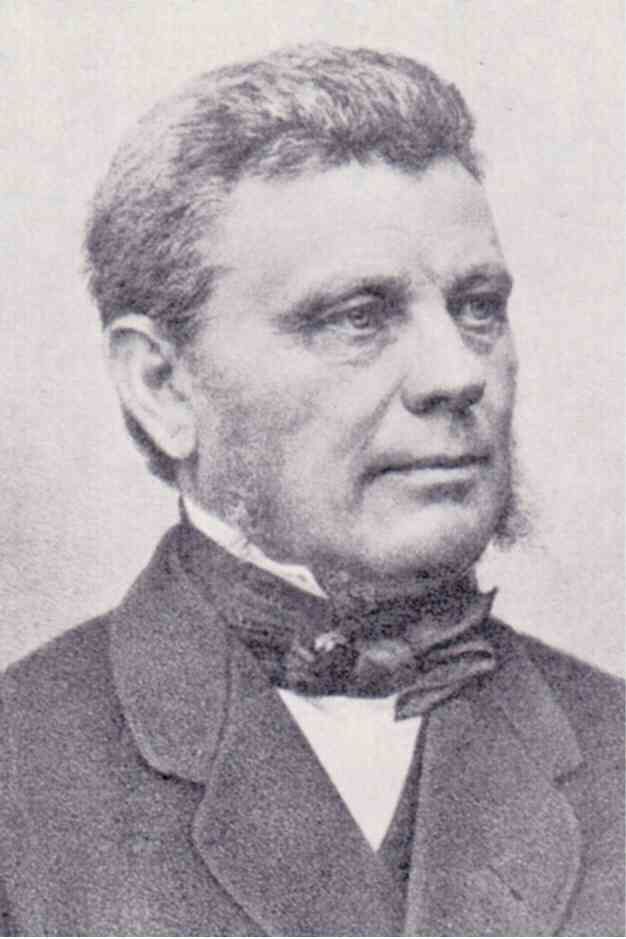
August Willads Bech

In 1846, Poul Christian von Stemann sold Valbygård to August Willads Bech. In 1855, he also acquired Brorupgaard. Bech was married to Margrethe Rothe (1823–86), a daughter of counter admiral and former governor of the Danish West Indies Carl Adolph Rothe. The old, half-timbered main building was very neglected and Bech, therefore, chose to replace it with a new main building in 1853–1855. The new building was designed by his cousin and close friend, Albert Winstrup (1815–89), who was an architect.

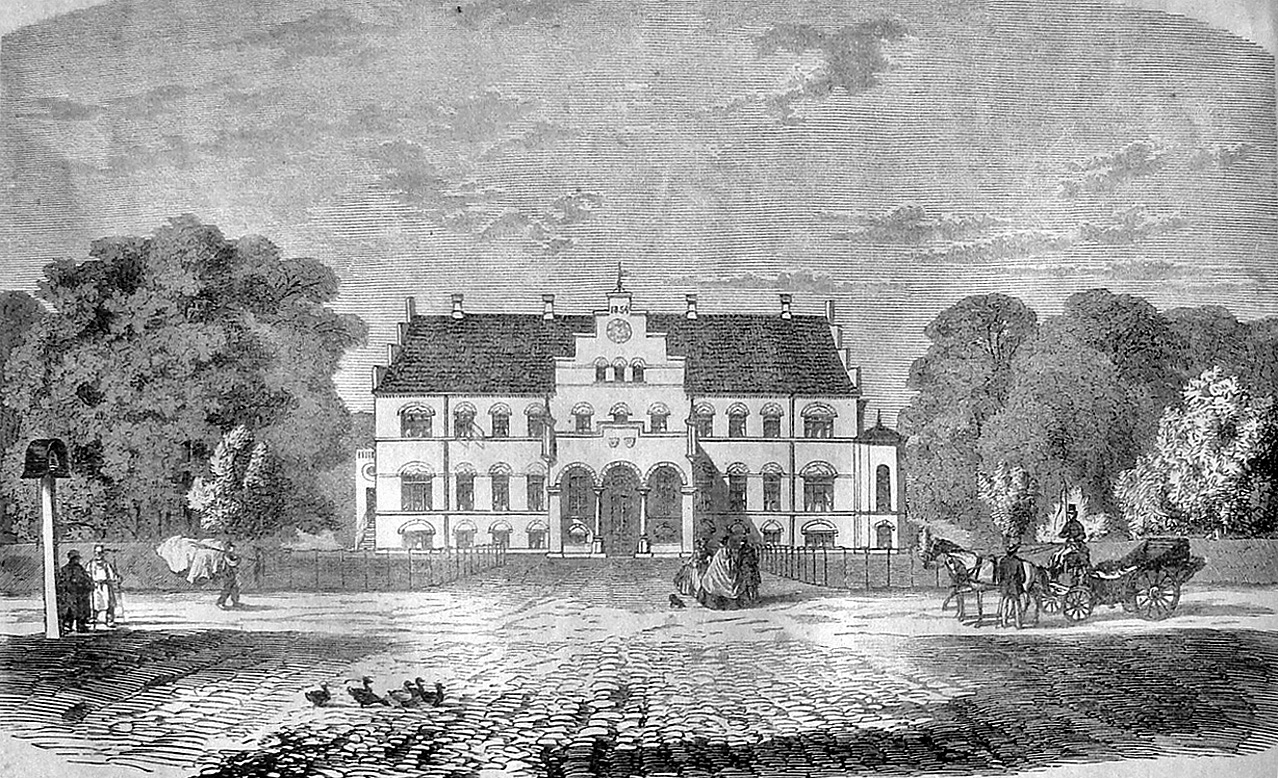
The new main building in 1860

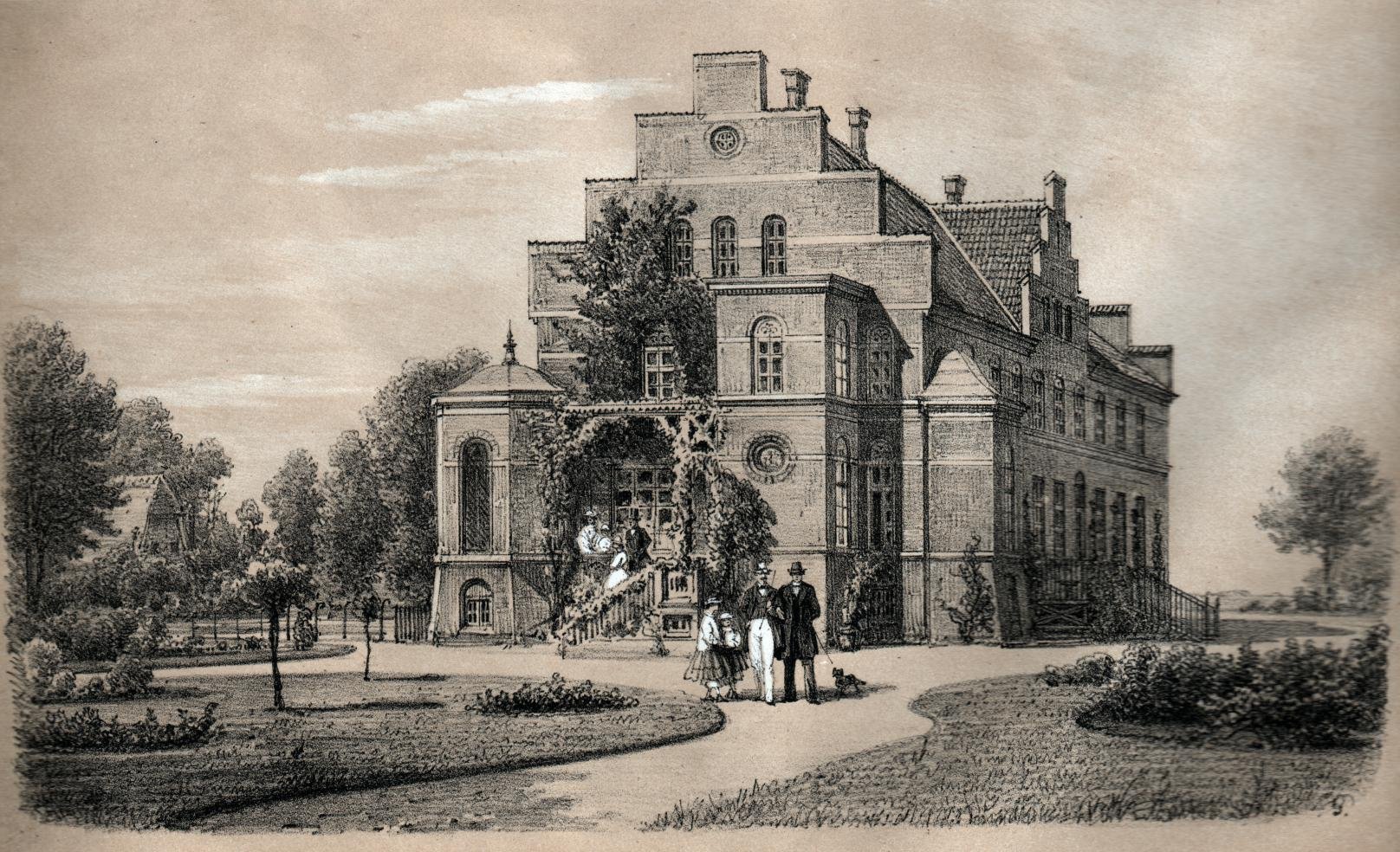
Valbygård depicted by Ferdinand Richardt in 1861

He was like his predecessor also interested and agriculture and also improved the management of the estate. His initiatives included the planting of conifer, beech and oak plantations. In 1866, he arranged two agricultural shows in Sorø and Præstø which raised 55.000 Danish rigsdaler for wounded soldiers and those left behind by fallen soldiers of the Second Schleswig War. He created an extensive collection of antiquities from the area and was also the owner of a significant collection of Italian paintings and sculptures.

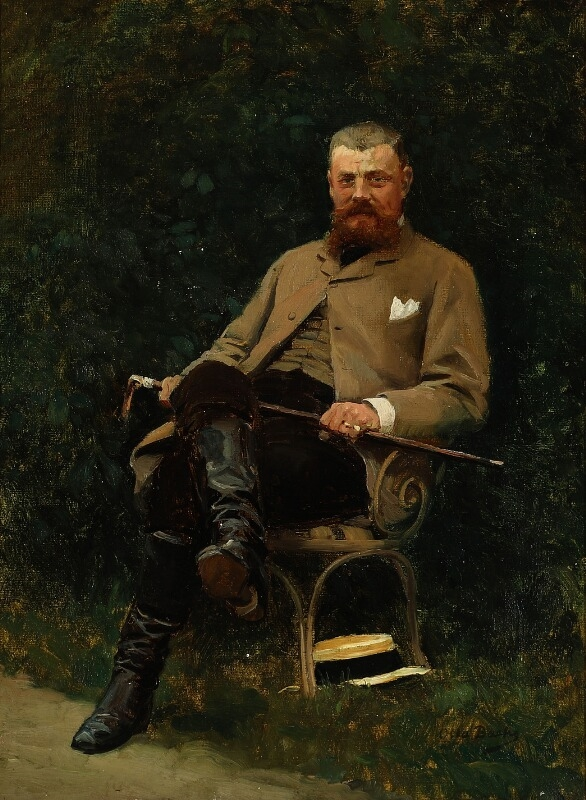
Jørgen Peter Beck painted by Otto Bache in 1909

August Willads Bech's eldest son, Jørgen Peter Bech, inherited Valbygård after his father's death in 1877. His mother, Margrethe Bech, kept Borupgård until her death in 1886. Jørgen Peter Bech was married to Caroline Charlotte Suhr, a daughter of Ole Berendt Suhr and thus a cousin on his mother's side. Bech was director of Den Suhrske Stiftelse from 1893 to 1908.

Jørgen Peter Bech died in 1909 and Valbygård then passed to their son August Villads Bech. August Villads Bech seceded his father as director of Den Suhrske Stiftelse and was also chairman of Sparekassen for Slagelse og Omegn. Valbygård was after August Villads Bech's death passed to his son, Jørgen Peter Bech. August Villads Bech's widow remained on the estate until her death

== Architecture ==
The two-storey main building is built of building with Dutch gables, bay windows and verandas. The bricks were manufactured in the estate's own kiln from 1847. A library extension was constructed for Jørgen Peter Bech in 1884 at the western gable.

== Cultural references ==
Valbygaard has been used as a location in the film Slægten (1978) and Sort høst (1993).

== List of owners ==
- ( –1774) The Crown
- (1774–1776) Joachim Melchior Holten Castenschiold
- (1776–1805) Jørgen Frederik Castenschiold
- (1805–1846) Poul Christian von Stemann
- (1846–1877) August Willads Bech
- (1877–1909) Jørgen Peter Bech
- (1909–1940) August Villads Bech
- (1940–1972) Jørgen Peter Bech
- (1972–2007) August Villads Bech
- (2007–present) Jørgen Peter Bech
