= Ludvig Holstein-Holsteinborg =

Danish politician

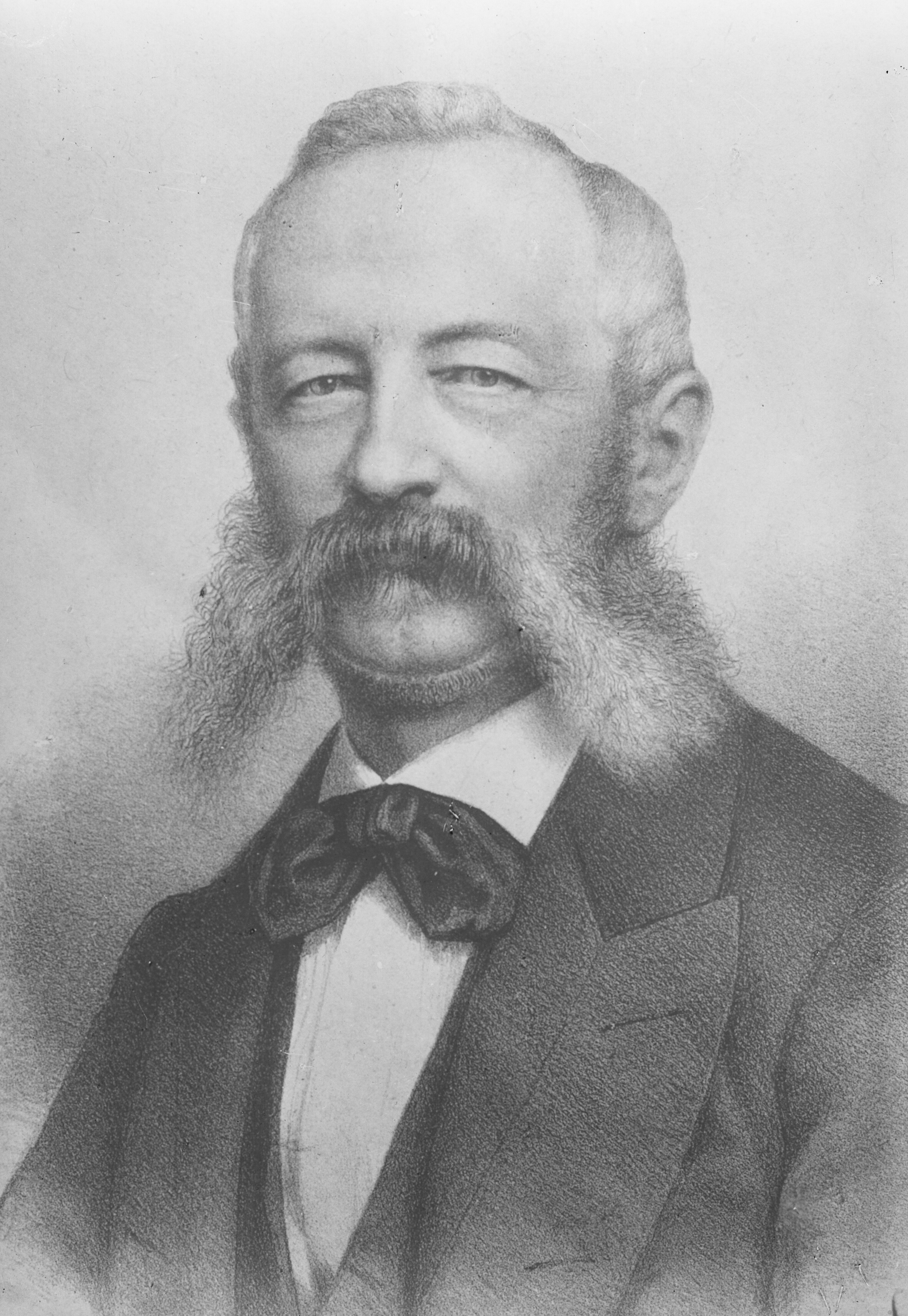

Council President of Denmark
- In office 28 May 1870 – 14 July 1874
- Monarch: Christian IX
- Preceded by: Christian Emil Krag-Juel-Vind-Frijs
- Succeeded by: Christen Andreas Fonnesbech

Personal details
- Born: 18 July 1815 Holsteinborg
- Died: 28 April 1892 (aged 76) Copenhagen
- Party: Mellempartiet
- Relations: Oscar O'Neill Oxholm (grandson)
- Education: University of Berlin (attended); University of Copenhagen

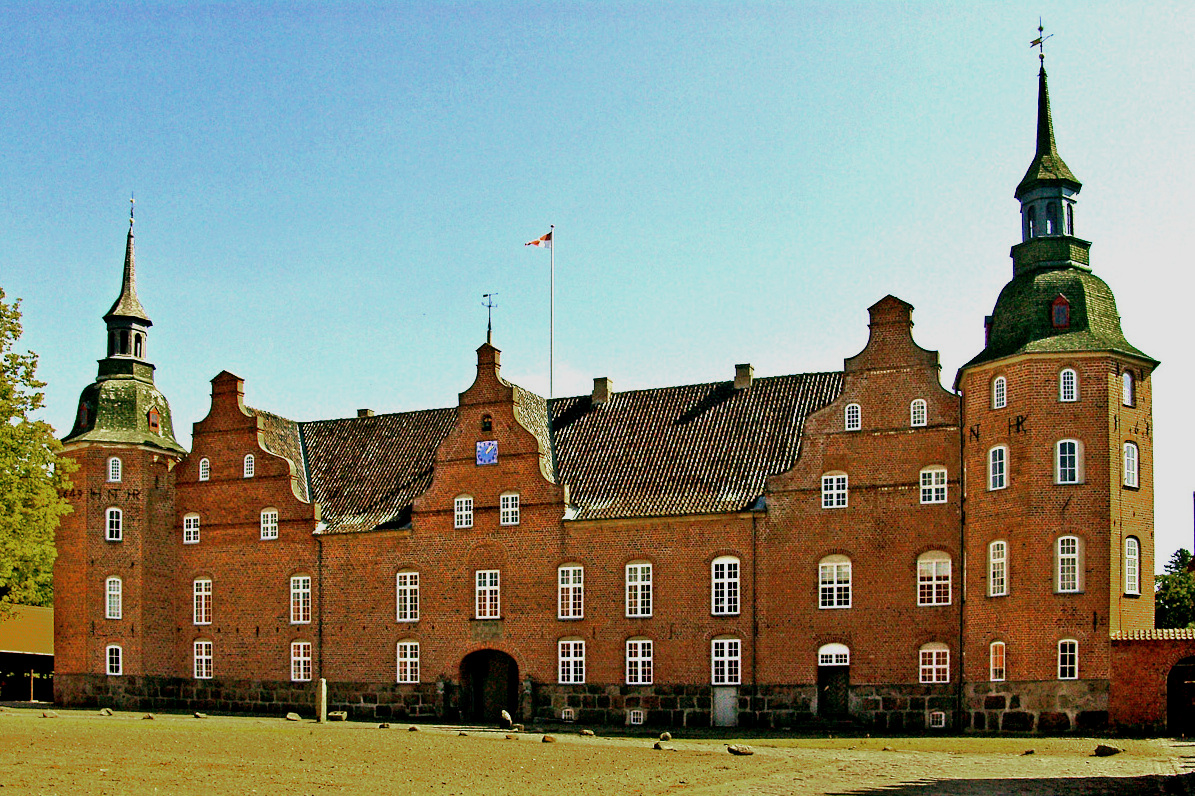
Holsteinborg Manor, 2010

Ludvig Henrik Carl Herman Holstein, Greve til Holsteinborg (18 July 1815 – 28 April 1892), was a Danish politician, landowner and noble. He was Council President of Denmark from 28 May 1870 to 14 July 1874 (4 years, 1 month, 16 days).

== Early life ==
Holstein was born at Holsteinborg Manor in Slagelse, Denmark. He was a son of Friedrich Adolph Holstein, Count of Holsteinborg, and Wilhelmine Juliane Reventlow. He was a descendant of Ulrik Adolf Holstein (1664–1737) and was the 7th Count of Holsteinborg.

In 1836 he enrolled at the University of Berlin but graduated from the University of Copenhagen.

== Premiership ==
Although he was himself a member of the Centre Party (Danish: Mellempartiet), Holstein led a coalition between the National Landowners and the National Liberals. The ministry was dominated by its three National Liberal ministers, Carl Christian Hall, Andreas Frederik Krieger and Carl Emil Fenger.

As Prime Minister, Holstein rarely put forward his own opinions; his role was so passive that editor Vilhelm Topsøe satirized him as "the topping on the Kransekake".

In 1870, he received the Grand Cross of Order of the Dannebrog and was knighted in the Order of the Elephant. In 1862 he had become Dannebrogsmand and in 1872 he had received the Merit Medal in gold.

== Personal life ==
On 21 March 1850, Holstein married Bodild Joachimine "Mimi" Zahrtmann (1830–1876), the daughter of Navy Minister Admiral C.C. Zahrtmann. They had five children, including:

- Count Ulrik Adolph Holstein (1851–1883), who married Amalie Charlotte Sophie Hullstrøm in 1877.
- Countess Bodild Mimi (b. 1853), who married C.F. Donner in Hamburg in 1873.
- Count Frederik Conrad Christian Christoffer (1856–1924), who married Ellen Elisabeth Lindholm.
- Countess Sophie Elizabeth "Else" (1859–1935), who married Godtfred Bruun Neergaard.
- Countess Fritze Wilhelmine Wanda Theodora (b. 1867), who married Oscar Siegfred Christian O'Neill Oxholm (1855–1926), son of Oscar O'Neill Oxholm.

She died in 1876. He married Betzy Laura Rasmussen on 30 November 1878, with whom he had one son:

- Count Henrik Frants Harald Holstein (b. 1879), who married Anna Margrethe Jensen.

Count Holstein died on 28 April 1892.

Political offices
Preceded by Christian Emil Krag-Juel-Vind-Frijs	Council President of Denmark; 28 May 1870 – 14 July 1874	Succeeded by Christen Andreas Fonnesbech
