= Detlef Lienau =

German architect

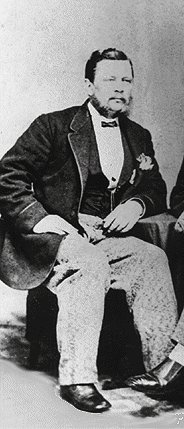
- image of Detlef Lienau
- Born: 17 February 1818; Uetersen, Denmark
- Died: 29 August 1887 (aged 69); New York City, U.S.
- Education: École des Beaux-Arts, Paris
- Occupation: Architect
- Spouse: Catherine Van Giesen Booraem (after 1853)
- Children: 5, including Jacob August Lienau
- Buildings: Grace Church Van Vorst; New Brunswick Theological Seminary; Lockwood–Mathews Mansion

Detlef Lienau (17 February 1818 – 29 August 1887) was a German architect born in Holstein. He is credited with having introduced the French style to American building construction, notably the mansard roof and all its decorative flourishes. Trained at the École des Beaux-Arts, Paris, he designed virtually every type of Victorian structure—cottages, mansions, townhouses, apartment houses, hotels, tenements, banks, stores, churches, schools, libraries, offices, factories, railroad stations, and a museum. Lienau was recognized by clients and colleagues alike as one of the most creative and technically proficient architects of the period, and was one of the 29 founding members of the American Institute of Architects.

== Life and career ==
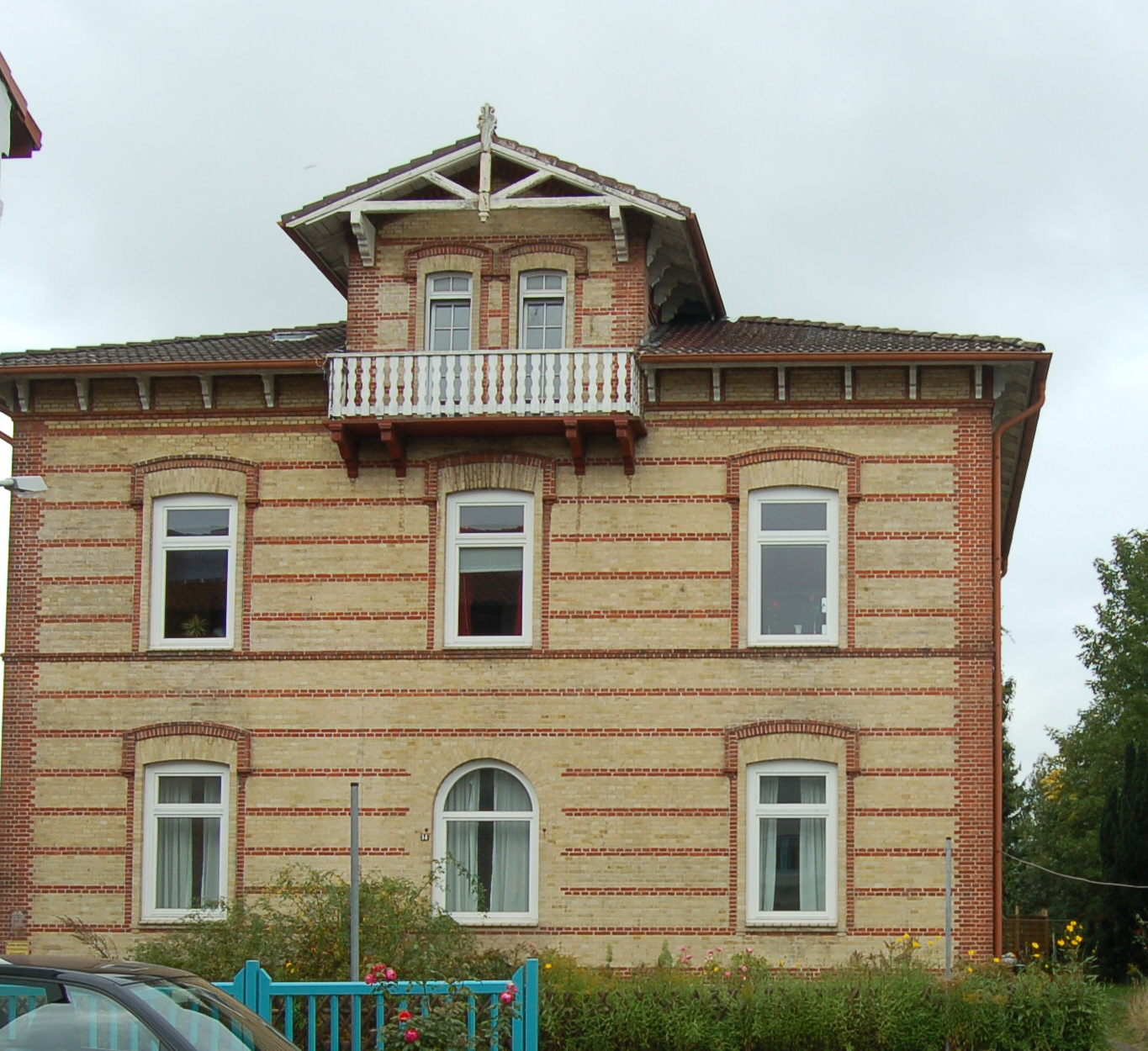
Leinau's birthplace in Uetersen

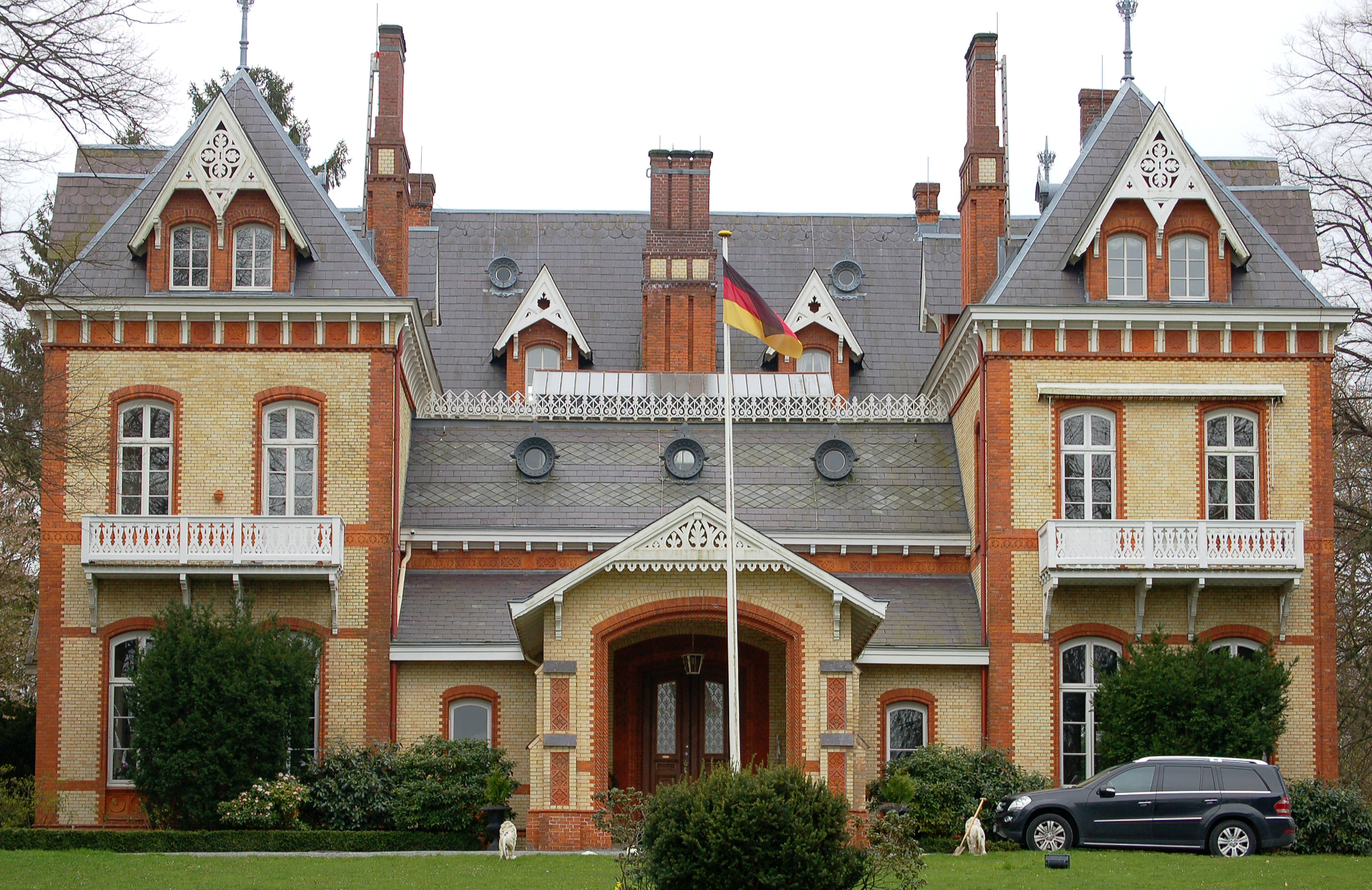
“Schloss Düneck” in Moorrege, Germany

Lienau was born to a German family in an area of Denmark that later became part of Germany. He immigrated to the United States in 1848 and on May 11, 1853, he married Catherine Van Giesen Booraem. It was his first marriage and her second. Lienau and Catherine had five children: Jacob August Lienau (1854–1906), Detlef Lienau II, Catherine Cornelia Lienau, Lucy Lienau, and Louise Lienau. All but the eldest son, J. August, died young. His great-great-great-granddaughter is Jane Lienau, a prestigious teacher of classics at Brunswick High School. J. August followed in his father's footsteps and became an architect, designing mostly residential structures after taking over his father's practice in 1887. He later formed a partnership with Thomas Nash, which lasted through the late 1920s.

After Catherine's death in 1861, Lienau married Harriet Jane Wreaks in 1866 and they had two children: Eleanor F. and Jacob Henry. In 1935, J. Henry donated about 800 of his father's professional drawings, photographs and other original documents to the Avery Library of Architecture and Fine Arts at Columbia University.

Lienau was one of a relatively small group of trained architects, of whom the majority were fairly recent arrivals from Great Britain and the continent. All brought with them to the New World the traditions of the Old, but Lienau differed from his colleagues in one important respect: Molded by his early Danish and North German environment, and by years of study in various German art centers and in Paris, Lienau had a point of view more international than theirs—a rarity in an age of ardent nationalism. Thus, a fusion of traditions enabled him to adapt quickly to life in America and to deal successfully with the demands of an increasingly eclectic age. Another point that should be stressed, since it has long been ignored: It was Lienau, not Richard Morris Hunt, who was the first to bring to the United States a mind and a hand that was shaped, through contact with Henri Labrouste, by the French Beaux-Arts tradition.

Lienau's career provides a dramatic illustration of the contributions made by the professionally trained European architect to American architecture. His chief importance to American architecture of the period from 1850 to the mid-1980s lies not in his use of the Second Empire mode per se, nor in his general eclecticism, but in the classical orientation of his entire practice. His work represents a continuing current of conservatism in American architecture, which for a time was submerged beneath the more dominant picturesque modes of the period, the High Victorian Gothic and the Second Empire—the latter quite as anti-classical in its later style phase as the former. He served as a bridge between the classical traditions of design of the second quarter of the 19th century and their re-emergence in the 1880s of the movement led in New York by the firm of McKim, Mead & White.

Among the architects Lienau is said to have influenced are Henry Janeway Hardenbergh and Paul Johannes Pelz, both of whom worked in Lienau's office-workshop. According to Hardenbergh, Lienau never had more than six men in his office, so he could really devote some time to them. Thus, through the work of his many pupils, Lienau's influence continued down through the early years of the 20th century.

From simple cottages to great mansions, Lienau used many modes to express his own ideas and the wishes of his clients in what he considered to be their most appropriate form. The Chalet and Stick style of the early cottages, the Italian Villa, the monumental French Renaissance tradition (all reflections of the picturesque High Victorian Gothic of the late ’60s and early ’70s), and finally echoes of the Queen Anne and of the Colonial Revival—all found expression in Lienau’s work.

Lienau died in New York City. His drawings and papers are held in the Department of Drawings & Archives at the Avery Architectural and Fine Arts Library at Columbia University in New York City.

== Buildings ==
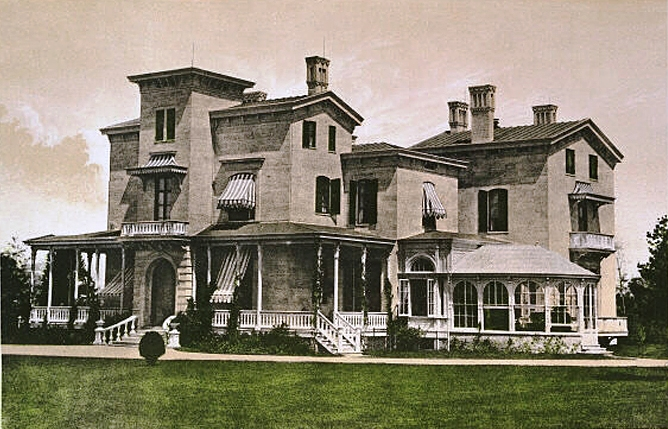
Nuits

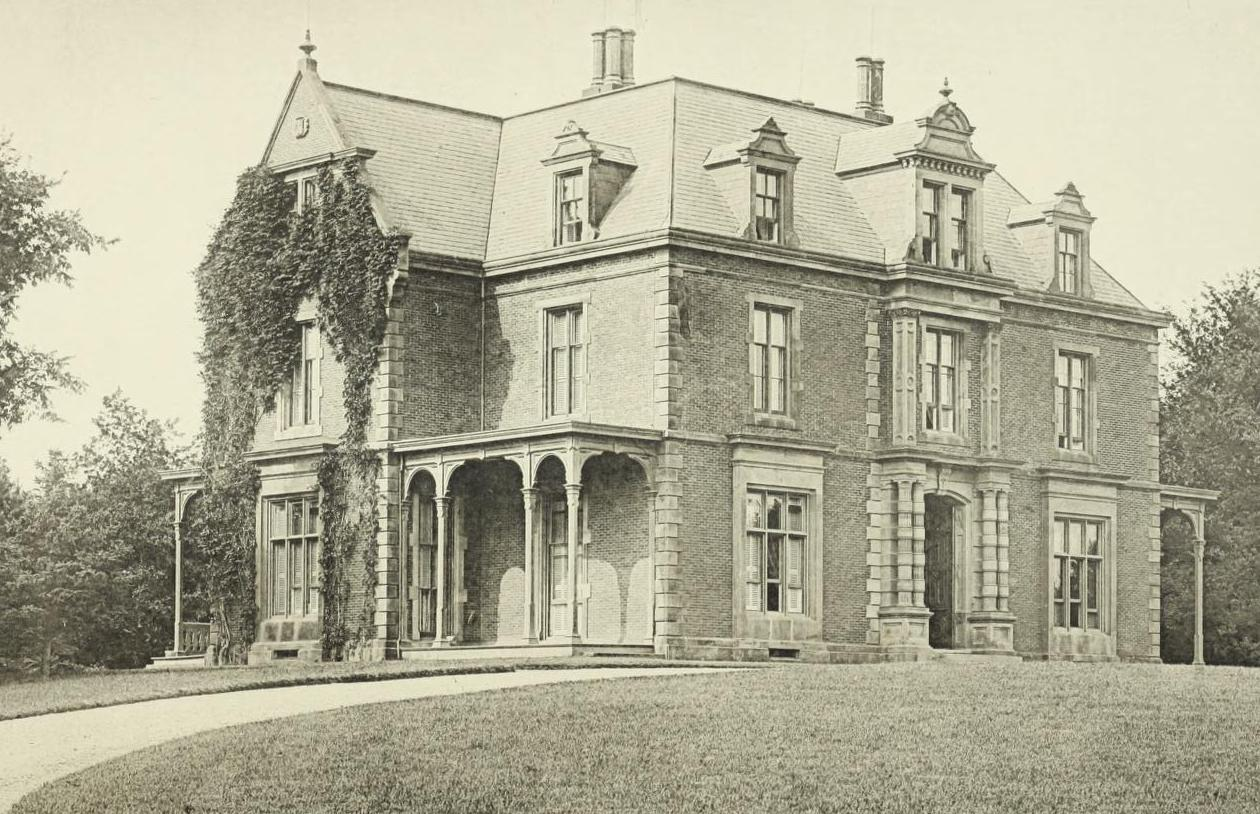
Beach Cliffe

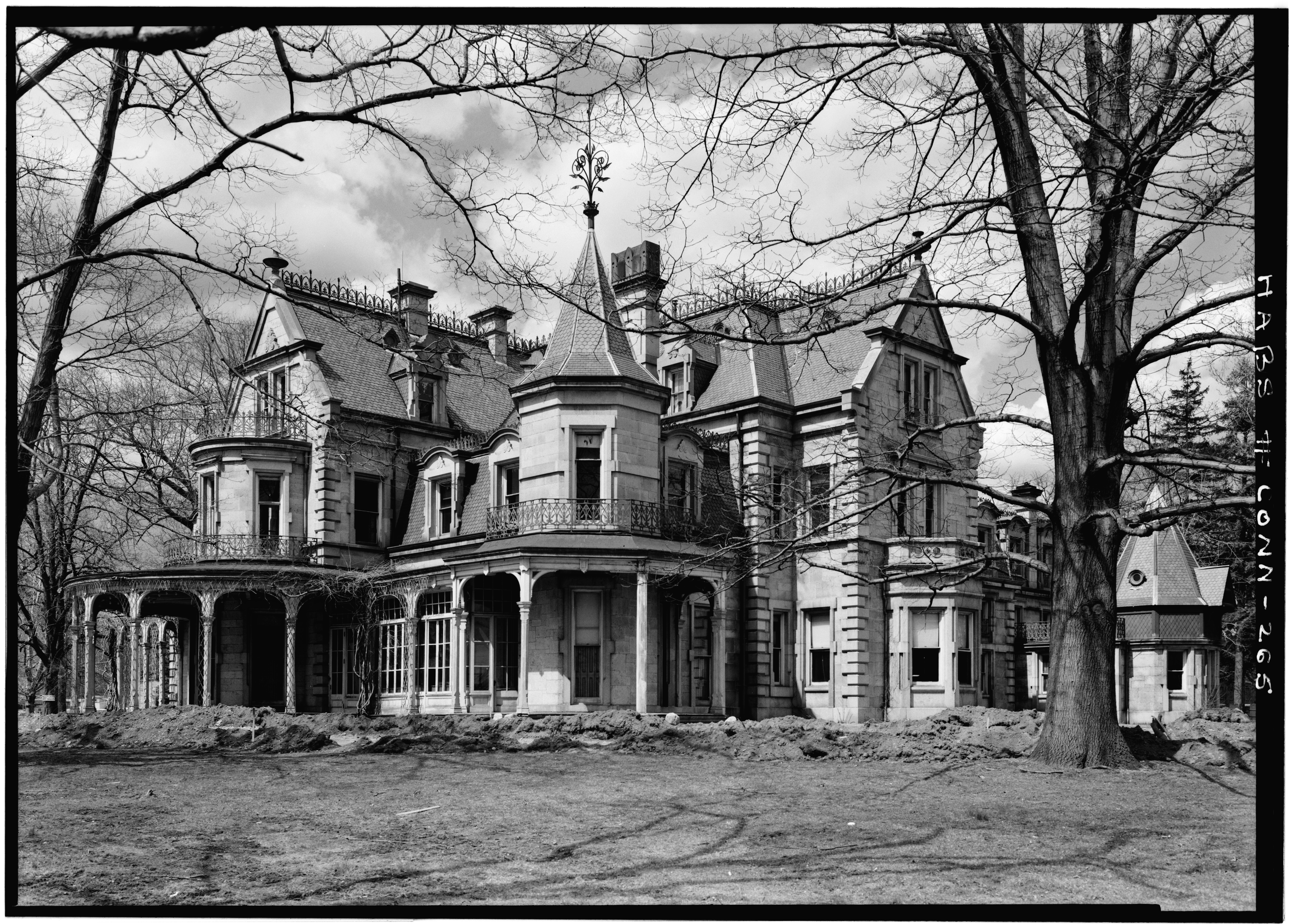
Elm Park

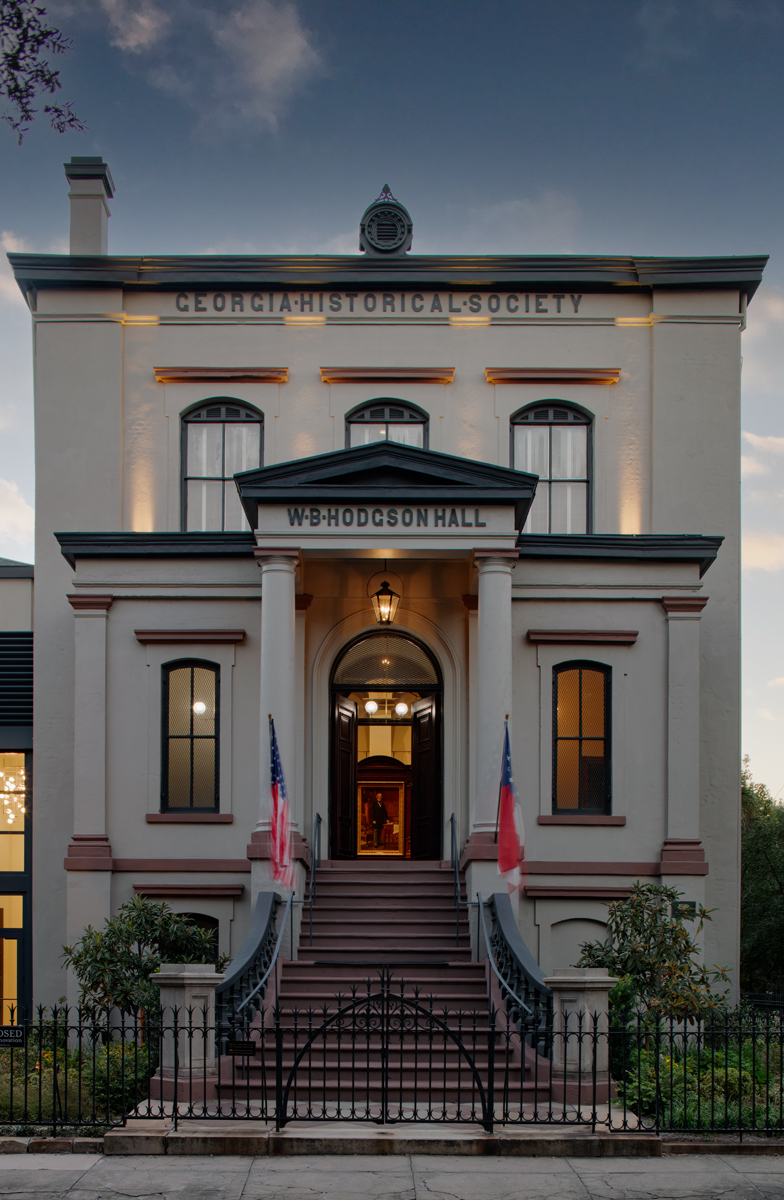
Hodgson Hall

Some of Lienau’s most important commissions (by completion date of their first phase). Those in boldface are on the National Register of Historic Places.
1849—Michael Lienau cottage; 44 Jersey Avenue; Jersey City, NJ.
1852—Beach Cliffe; Kane Villa; Bath Road; Newport, RI.
1852—Francis Cottenet Villa (Nuits); Hudson Road and Clifton Place; Ardsley-on-Hudson, NY.
1852—Hart M. Shiff House; Fifth Avenue at 10th Street; New York, NY.
1853—Grace Church Van Vorst; Erie Avenue and Second Street; Jersey City, NJ
1854—Oakwood; 50 Narragansett Avenue; Newport, RI.
1859—William C. Schermerhorn House; 49 West 23rd Street; New York, NY.
1862—F.O. Matthiessen & Weichers sugar refinery; South Street; Jersey City, NJ.
1864—First National Bank; 1 Exchange Place; Jersey City, NJ.
1865—New York Life & Trust Company; 52 Wall Street; New York, NY.
1868—Elm Park (now known as the "Lockwood-Mathews Mansion"), 295 West Avenue; Norwalk, Connecticut.
1868—New York Sugar Refining Company; Washington and Essex Streets; Jersey City, NJ.
1868—L. Marcotte factory and warehouse; 160-164 West 32nd Street; New York, NY.
1869—Edmund Schermerhorn House; 45-47 West 23rd Street; New York, NY.
1870—Mrs. Rebecca Jones Block; Fifth Avenue between 55th and 56th Street; New York, NY.
1871—American Jockey Club; Madison Avenue at 27th Street; New York, NY.
1871—Henry A. Booraem Block; Second Street; Jersey City, NJ.
1871—Schermerhorn Apartments; 2131-2137 Third Avenue; New York, NY.
1872—Grosvenor House Hotel; Fifth Avenue at 10th Street; New York, NY.
1872—Michael Lienau Villa (Schloss Düneck); Moorrege, Germany.
1873—Matthew Wilks Residence (Cruickston Park); Blair, ON, Canada.
1874—DeLancey Kane Estate loft building; 676 Broadway; New York, NY.
1875—Edward Bech Villa outbuildings (Rosenlund, now Marist College); Poughkeepsie, NY.
1875—New Brunswick Theological Seminary (Sage Library); 17 Seminary Place; New Brunswick, NJ.
1876—W. B. Hodgson Hall; 501 Whitaker Street; Savannah, GA.
1879—George Mosle townhouse; 5 West 51st Street; New York, NY.
1880—Walter H. Lewis Cottage (Anglesea); Ochre Point; Newport, RI.
1881—William C. Schermerhorn store and loft building; 116-118 East 14th Street; New York, NY.
1881—Barron Loft Building; 129-131 Greene Street; New York, NY.
1882—Daniel Parish Estate office building; 67 Wall Street; New York, NY.
1883—Mrs. Mary M. Williams Cottage; 1135 Hamilton Street; Somerset, NJ. See: Tulipwood (Somerset, New Jersey)
1883—Daniel Parish store and loft building; 860 Broadway; New York, NY.
1884—Mrs. Mary M. Williams Row; 37-47 West 82nd Street; New York, NY.
1886—Restoration of Telfair family mansion as Telfair Academy of Arts and Sciences
1887—Lienau-Williams Row; 48–54 West 82nd Street; New York, NY.

== Sources ==
Ellen Weill Kramer. The Domestic Architecture of Detlef Lienau, a Conservative Victorian. West Conshohocken, PA: Infinity Publishing.
