= Brorupgaard =

Manor house in Denmark

- Interactive map of the Brorupgaard area

General information
- Location: Kalundborgvej 115; 4200 Slagelse, Denmark
- Coordinates: 55.43916°N 11.31989°E
- Completed: ?
- Renovated: 1848

Brorupgaard is a manor house and estate situated close to Slagelse in Denmark. It was owned by Ludvig Holberg from 1740 until 1754. The current main building was constructed by August Willads Bech in 1856 and the estate has remained in the hands of the Bech family since then.

== History ==
=== Early history ===
Brorup (also seen as Broderup) is first mentioned as a manor in the Middle Ages and was then owned by Roskilde Bishopric and operated as a fief. The fiefholders included Peder Nielsen, Niels Pedersen and Clement Griis.

In 1454, Brorup and Sønderup were ceded to Antvorskov Abbey in exchange for Svenstrup. After being confiscated by the Crown in connection with the Reformation, it seems to have been reduced to a simple tenant farm.

=== Rosenpalm and the new manor ===
In 1674, Christian V sold the land to Poul Nielsen. After starting in an insignificant position at the royal court, as Crown Prince Christian's tutor, he had managed to work his way up through the ranks, culminating with his ennoblement under the name Rosenpalme in 1679. Back in 1668, he had married Anne Nilesen, née Anderdatter, a recently orphaned daughter of a wealthy merchant in Slagelse. it was this marriage that had provided him with the means to buy the land. In 1679, in conjunction with his ennoblement, Brorupgaard was also granted the status of a manor. He later increased the size of the estate through the acquisition of more land. On his death in 1688, he left his widow in rather difficult economic circumstances. In 1708, she ceded Brorupgaard to their son Andreas Rosenpalm. A naval officer, he served in the Great Northern War.

=== 18th century ===
By 1712, Andreas Rosenpalm sold the estate to Berte Skeel. In the following year, she sold it in public auction. The new owner was Johan Severin Benzon. He was also the owner of a number of other estates, including Estvadgaard in Jutland.

Map of the Borupgaard estate, 1803

In 1735, he took a loan from Ludvig Holberg. Holberg, who was already the owner of nearby Tersløsegaard, became the new owner of Brorupgaard in 1740. He significantly increased the size of the estate through the acquisition of new tenant farms in the area. In 1845, Holberg more than doubled his holdings in the area with the purchase of nearby Tersløsegaard.

Being both unmarried and childless, Holberg agreed to leave his estates, library and most of his fortune to the academy. The agreement with the king included that Holberg earned the title of Baron of Holberg. This meant that he would be free of taxes from any income from his estate's time. The new Sorø Academy was inaugurated on 26 July 1749.

=== 1800–1850 ===
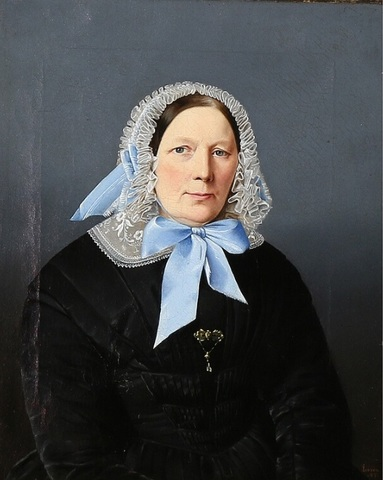
Anne Margrethe Lange

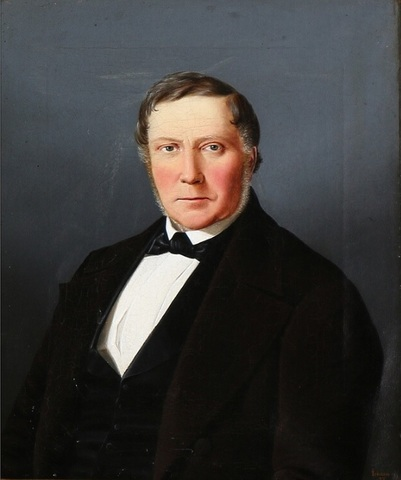
Lauritz Christopher Worsøe

In 1805, Sorø Academy sold Brorupgaard to Mads Jensen Westergaard. The next owner was Heinrich Vorbeck (1798–1881), who was originally from Bothmer in Mecklenburg-Schwerin. In 1840, he sold out to Lauritz Christophersen Worsøe (1790–1862).

=== Bech family ===
Brorupgaard was once again struck by fire in 1855. The estate was the same year sold to August Willads Bech. The two estates had a combined area of more than 600 hectares (1,500 acres) and were mainly used for the breeding of cattle. He operated a modern dairy on his estate. He was also a pioneer in the cultivation of root crops. In 1856, he increased his holdings with the acquisitions of Moselund in Engesvang at Silkeborg. He planted forest on most of the estate.

Bech was married to Margrethe Rothe, daughter of Counter Admiral Carl Adolph Rothe. On Bech's death in 1877, she took over Brorupgaard while Valbygaard passed to their eldest son, Peter Kørgen Bech.

== Architecture ==
The current main building was constructed by August Willads Bech in 1846.

== List of owners ==
- (–1454) Roskildebispen
- (1454–1536) Antvorskov Abbey
- (1536–1674) The Crown
- (1674–1688) Poul Nilesen Tosenpalm
- (1688–1708) Anne Nilesen, née Anderdatter Posenpalm
- (1708–1712) Anders Rosenpalm
- (1712–1714) Berte Skeel
- (1714–1740) Johan Severin Benzon
- (1740–1754) Ludvig Holberg
- (1754–1805) Sorø Academy
- (1805–) Mads Jensen Westtergaard
- (–1840) Heinrich von Vorbech
- (1840–1855) Lauritz Christopher Worsøe
- (1855–1877) August Willads Bech
- (1877–1886) Margrethe Bech
- (1886–) Bech family
- (2006–) Jørgen Peter Bech
