= August Willads Bech =

Danish landowner

August Bech
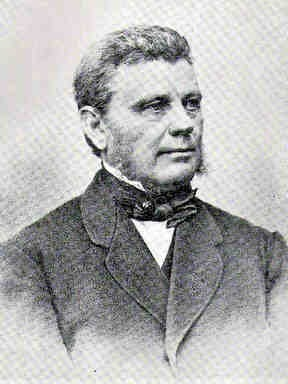
- August Bech
- Born: 21 July 1815; Copenhagen, Denmark
- Died: 28 May 1877 (aged 61); Engelsholm, Denmark
- Occupation: Landowner
- Relatives: Edward Bech (brother)
- Awards: Commander of the Dannebrog

August Willads Bech (21 July 1815 - 28 May 1877) was a Danish landowner. He owned the manorhouses of Valbygård and Brorupgaard both located near Slagelse. Valbygård is still owned by his descendants.

== Early life and education ==
Bech was born on 21 July 1815 in Copenhagen, the son of merchant and ship-owner Jørgen Peter Bech (1782–1846) and Ellen Sophie Magdalene Meyer (1784–1846). He grew up in his father's house at Nybrogade 22 and later studied agriculture in Denmark and Mecklenburg. His elder brother was Edward Bech, the Danish Counsel in New York.

== Career ==
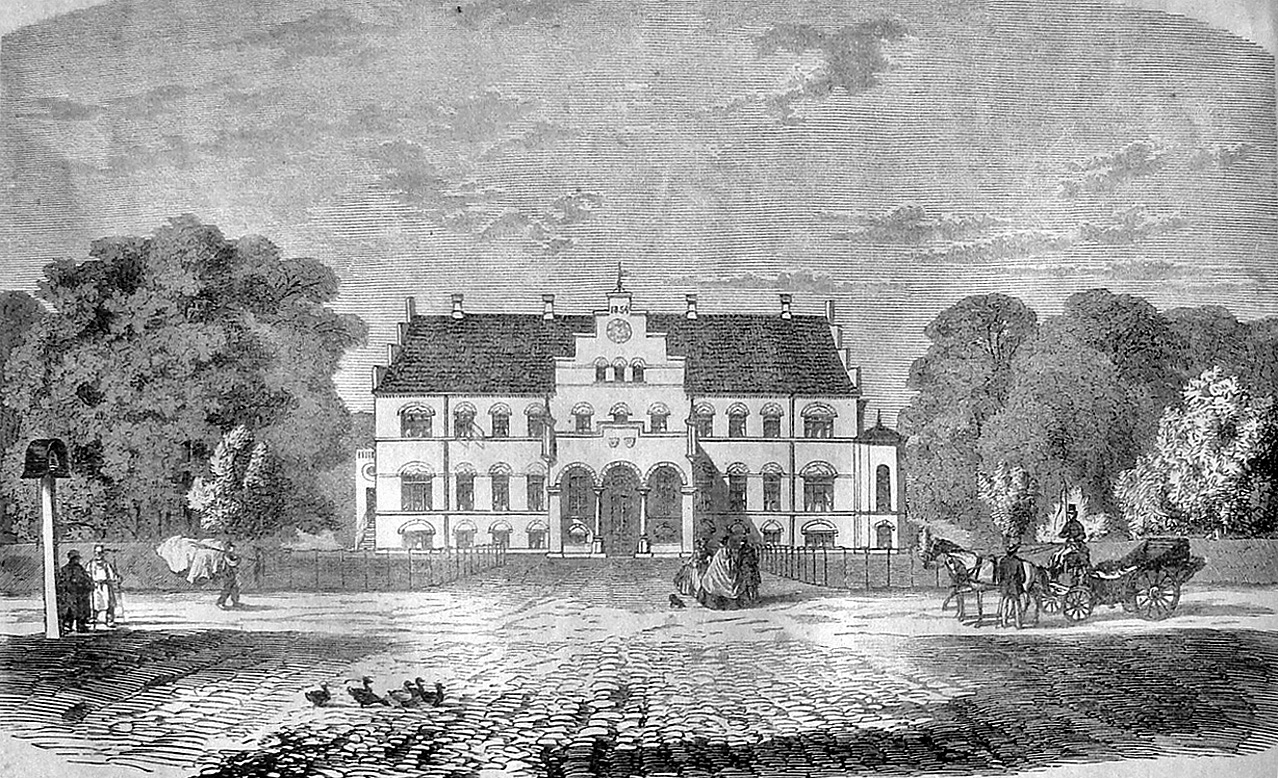
Valbygård's new main building in 1860

In 1840, Bech purchased Fredsholm at Nakskov on Lolland. In 1846, he purchased Valbygård at Slagelse for 500,000 Danish rigsdaler and then parted with Fredsholm the following year. He modernized the operations and converted many of the copyholds to freeholds. He also constructed a number of new buildings on the estate. In 1855, he also acquired nearby Brorupgård. The two estates had a combined area of more than 600 hectares and were mainly used for breeding of cattle. He operated a modern dairy on his estate. He was also a pioneer of cultivation of root crops. In 1856, he increased his holdings with the acquisitions of Moselund in Engesvang at Silkeborg. He planted forest on most of the estate.

From 1855 until his death, Bech was a member of Sorø County Council.

== Personal life and legacy ==
On 30 March 1842 in Holmen Church, Bech married Kirstine Margrethe (Grethe) Rothe (7 June 1823 - 21 March 1886), a daughter of counter admiral Carl Adolph Rothe (1767–1834) and Benedicte Ulfsparre de Tuxen (1790–1877).

He died on 28 May 1877 at Engelsholm in Vejle. He is buried at Norup Cemetery.

Valbygaard was passed down to his eldest son Jørgen Peter Bech. His second eldest son Carl Bech purchased Engelsholm Castle at Vejle. His elfest daughter Benedichte married Ludvig Eduard Alexander Reventlow, Count of Rudbjerggaard- The younger daughter Ellen Sophie Magdalene "Mimi" Bech married Knud Sehested, of Stamhuset Broholm on Funen.

== Accolades ==
In 1850, Bech was created a Knight in the Order of the Dannebrog In 1864, he was awarded the Cross of Honour.
