= Tulipwood (Somerset, New Jersey) =

Historic house in New Jersey, United States

- U.S. National Register of Historic Places
- New Jersey Register of Historic Places
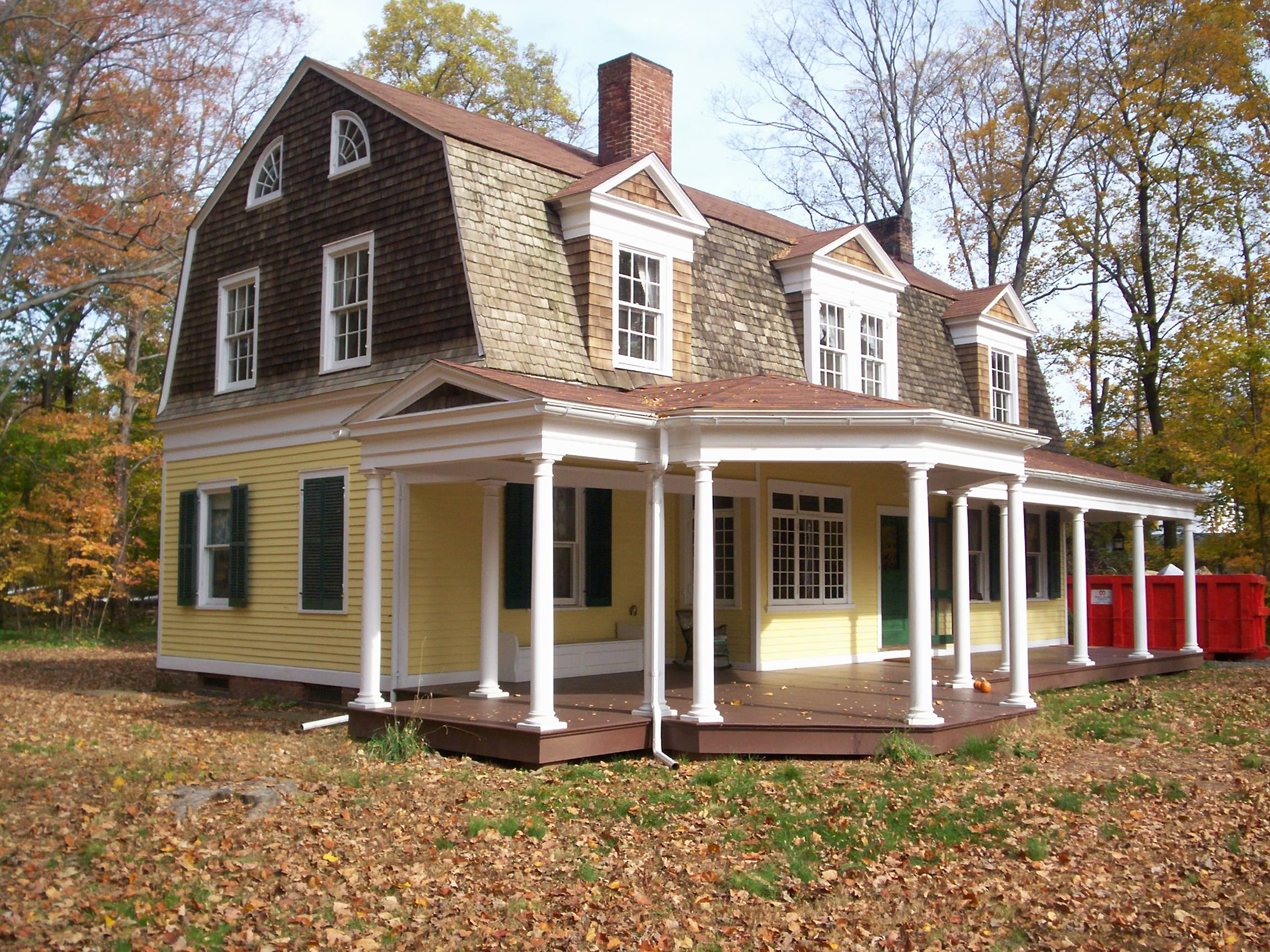
- Tulipwood in 2006

- Location within Somerset County, New Jersey
- Location: 1165 Hamilton Street, Somerset, New Jersey
- Coordinates: 40°29′13.6″N 74°29′41.6″W
- Built: 1892
- Architect: Jacob August Lienau
- Architectural style: Shingle Style
- NRHP reference No.: 05000966
- NJRHP No.: 4226

Significant dates
- Added to NRHP: September 9, 2005
- Designated NJRHP: July 14, 2005

Tulipwood is a shingle style historic home at 1165 Hamilton Street in the Somerset section of Franklin Township, Somerset County, New Jersey, United States. It was designed by Jacob August Lienau.

== History ==
The land has been owned by the family of Mary Maclay Pentz Williams since 1877. An 8-1/4 acre portion of the original 121-acre (0.49 km^{2}) property was transferred to Stephen Guion Williams in the last will and testament of Mary Williams on February 28, 1891.

The house, Tulipwood, was built for Stephen Guion Williams of the Williams & Guion Black Star Line family in 1892. It was the third house built on the property. In 1920 Tulipwood became the home of Leigh W. Kimball and his family. Kimball's grandson, Christopher Lehman was the last resident of Tulipwood before it was bought by Franklin Township, Somerset County, New Jersey in 2003 and transferred to the Meadows Foundation.

Tulipwood, also known as Whitehaven Farms, was added to the National Register of Historic Places on September 9, 2005.
