= Sallys Fancy, U.S. Virgin Islands =

Coordinates: 17°44′09″N 64°40′01″W

Sallys Fancy, United States Virgin Islands
- Village
- Interactive map of Sallys Fancy, United States Virgin Islands
- Country: United States Virgin Islands
- Island: Saint Croix
- Time zone: UTC-4 (AST)

Sallys Fancy is a settlement on the island of Saint Croix in the United States Virgin Islands.

== History ==
Sallys Fancy was a plantation owned by governor-general Peter Lotharius Oxholm.
