= Dønnerup =

Manor house in Holbæk Municipality, Denmark

- Interactive map of the Dønnerup area

General information
- Architectural style: Gothic Revival
- Location: Dønnerupvej 18, 4450 Jyderup, Denmark
- Coordinates: 55°37′15.7″N 11°25′7.32″E
- Completed: 1833

Dønnerup, formerly known as Benzonslund, is a manor house and estate located approximately five kilometres south of Jyderup, in Holbæk Municipality, some 80 kilometres west of Copenhagen, Denmark. The estate covers approximately 1,700 hectares and comprises Rangle Mølle and Holmstrup. The current main building was built in Gothic Revival style in 1933 after the old one had been destroyed in a fire.

== History ==
=== 1730–1820: Early history ===
TDønnerup was originally the name of a village. The name is first recorded as Dindethorp in 1199. In 1730, Supreme Court justice Peder Benzon was granted royal permission to close the village and convert the land into a new manor under the name Benzonslund.

Benzon died in 1735. In 1737, Benzonslund was sold to just 22-year-old army officer Henrik von Eickstedt. He would later play a key role in the revolt against Johann Friedrich Struensee. After just two years, he sold Benzonslund to lieutenant-colonel Reimer Henrik von Barner. In 1745, Benzonslund was acquired by Peder Willumsen for 12,300 Danish rigsdaler. After 12 years, it was sold to Køber var Christian Henrich Selchau (died 1788). In 1783, he ceded it to his son Christian Andreas Selchau.

In 1791, Schou Jr. sold the estate for 30m000 rigsdaler to Supreme Court justice Poul Christian von Stemann. In 1827, he was appointed as president of Danske Kancelli. In 1800, he sold Benzonslund to Johannes Meldahl. In 1806, Meldahl sold the estate to Cecilius Andreas Ulrik Rosenørn.

=== 1820–1925: Zytphen-Adeler family ===
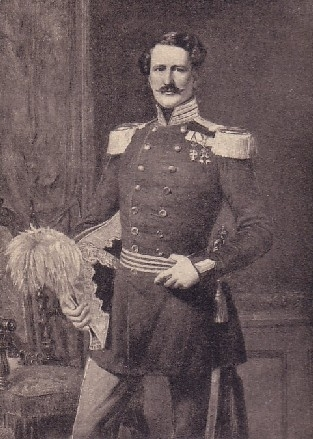
Georg Frederik Otto von Zytphen-Adeler

In 1829, Benzonslund was acquired by Berta Moltke, widow of Frederik, Baron Adeler. In 1843, it was included in the Barony of Adelersborg. Georg Frederik Otto von Zytphen, who was married to Bertha Adeler's grand daughter, was ennobled under the name Zytphen-Adeler in 1838. He managed the Benzonszlund estate from 1839 and became its owner in 1843.

Zytphen-Adeler introduced many improvements in the management of the estate. In 1867. he was granted royal permission to rename it Dønnerup after the former village.

=== 1925–present: Later history ===
The barony was dissolved in 1925, following the adoption of lensafløsningsloven. At the same time, Dønnerup was sold to Aage Hastrup. The main building was destroyed in a fire. In 1932–33, it was replaced by a new one. Members of the Hastrup family owned the estate until 1994.

== Architecture ==
Dønnerup is built in Gothic Revival style. It consists of a main wing with crow-stepped gables flanked by two detached side wings. All three buildings are white-washed with red tile roofs and have crow-stepped gables.

== Today ==
Dønnerup is owned and operated by Dønnerup A/. The estate covers 1276 hectares of land (2011) of which 173 hectares are farmland, 219 are hectares are pastures and 809 hectares are woodland.

== List of owners ==
- (1730–1735) Peder Benzon
- (1735–1737) The estate after Peder Benzon
- (1737–1739) Hans Henrik von Eickstedt
- (1739–1745) Reimer Henrich von Barner
- (1745–1757) Peder Willumsen
- (1757–1783) Christian Henrich Selchau
- (1783–1791) Christian Andreas Selchau
- (1791–1800) Poul Christian von Stemann
- (1800–1806) Johannes Meldahl
- (1806–1820) Cecilius Andreas Ulrik Rosenørn
- (1820–1843) Bertha Adeler, née Moltke
- (1843–1878) Georg Frederik Otto von Zytphen-Adeler
- (1878–1908) Frederik Herman Christian von Zytphen-Adeler
- (1908–1925) Georg Frederik de Falsen von Zytphen-Adeler
- (1925–1968) Aage Hastrup
- (1968–1988) Allan Hastrup
- (1988–1994) Andreas Hastrup
- (1994–2000) Dønnerup A/
