= Jacob August Lienau =

American architect

Jacob August Lienau (March 1854 – May 6, 1906) was an American architect.

He was born in March 1854 in New Jersey to Detlef Lienau. On November 30, 1884, he married Elizabeth Blair Williams (1854–1932) at Calvary Protestant Episcopal Church in Manhattan. She was the daughter of John Stanton Williams and Mary Maclay Pentz, and the sister of Stephen Guion Williams. They had three children: Elizabeth B. Lienau (1885–?), Mary W. Lienau (1887–?), and August William Lienau (1897–?).

He died on May 6, 1906, and was buried in Woodlawn Cemetery.

== Designs ==
- "Tulipwood"
- "Shady Rest", which was built for Mary Maclay Pentz Williams at 1135 Hamilton Street. It became a nursing home, Somerset Manor South, and was demolished in 2008.
- "Merrynook" was his own home at 1201 Hamilton Street and it later housed the Art Institute of New Jersey.
- 220 Mercer St, Princeton, New Jersey for Ernest Cushing Richardson
- 160 Hodge Road, Princeton, New Jersey for Marie Coddington
