= Rosenfeldt =

Manor house and estate in Denmark

Rosenfeldt Manor
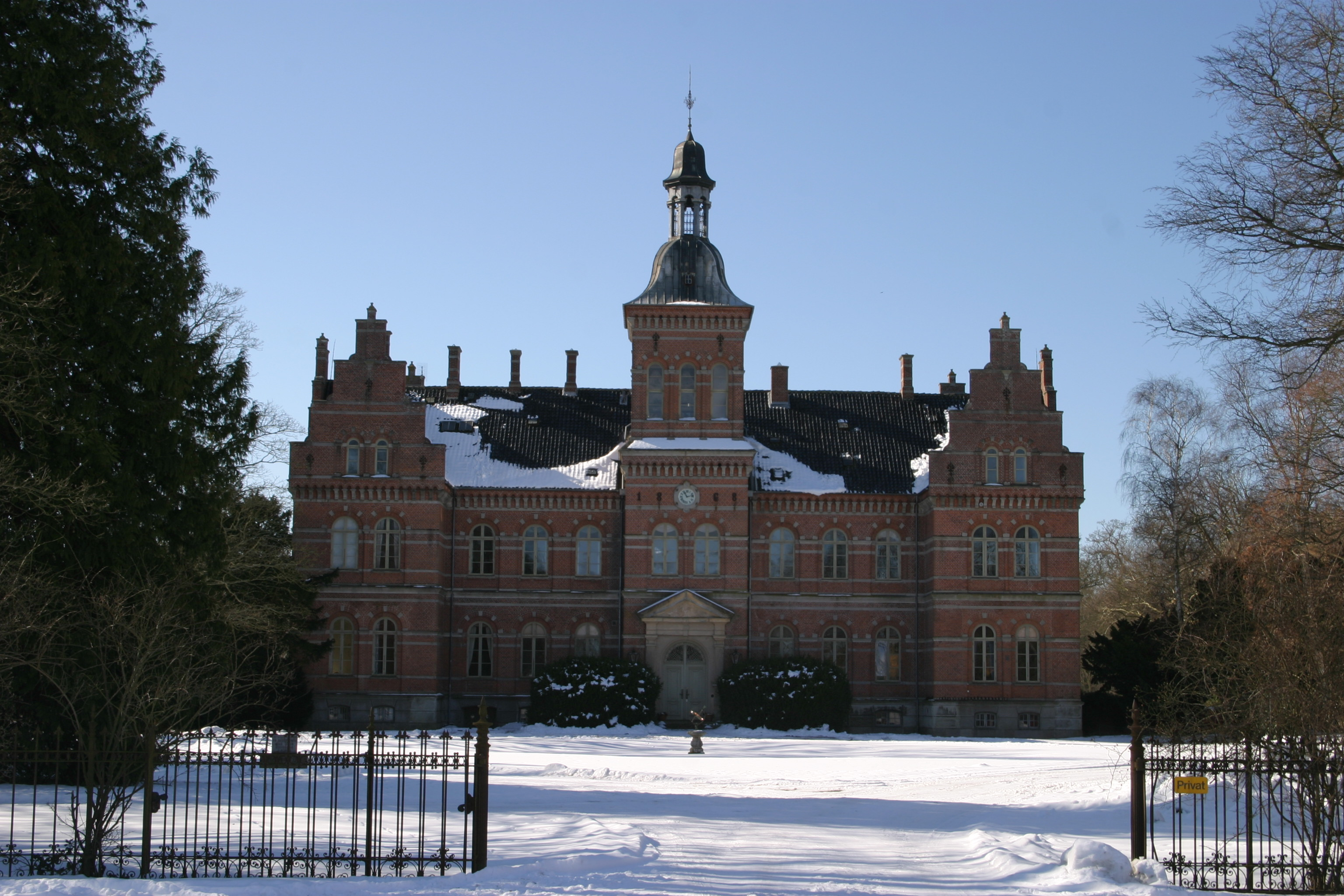
- Interactive map of the Rosenfeldt Manor area

General information
- Architectural style: Renaissance Revival architecture
- Location: Vordingborg Municipality, Denmark
- Coordinates: 55.0168°N 11.8762°E
- Construction started: 1868
- Completed: 1870

Design and construction
- Architect: Henrik Steffens Sibbern

Rosenfeldt Manor is a manor house and estate located just west of Vordingborg, Vordingborg Municipality, some 90 km south of Copenhagen, Denmark. One of 12 new manors created when Vordingborg Cacalry District was dissolved in 1774, its first owner was Reinhard Iselin. The current main building was constructed for Oscar O'Neill Oxholm in 1870 to a design by Henrik Steffens Sibbern.

== History ==
=== Iselin family ===
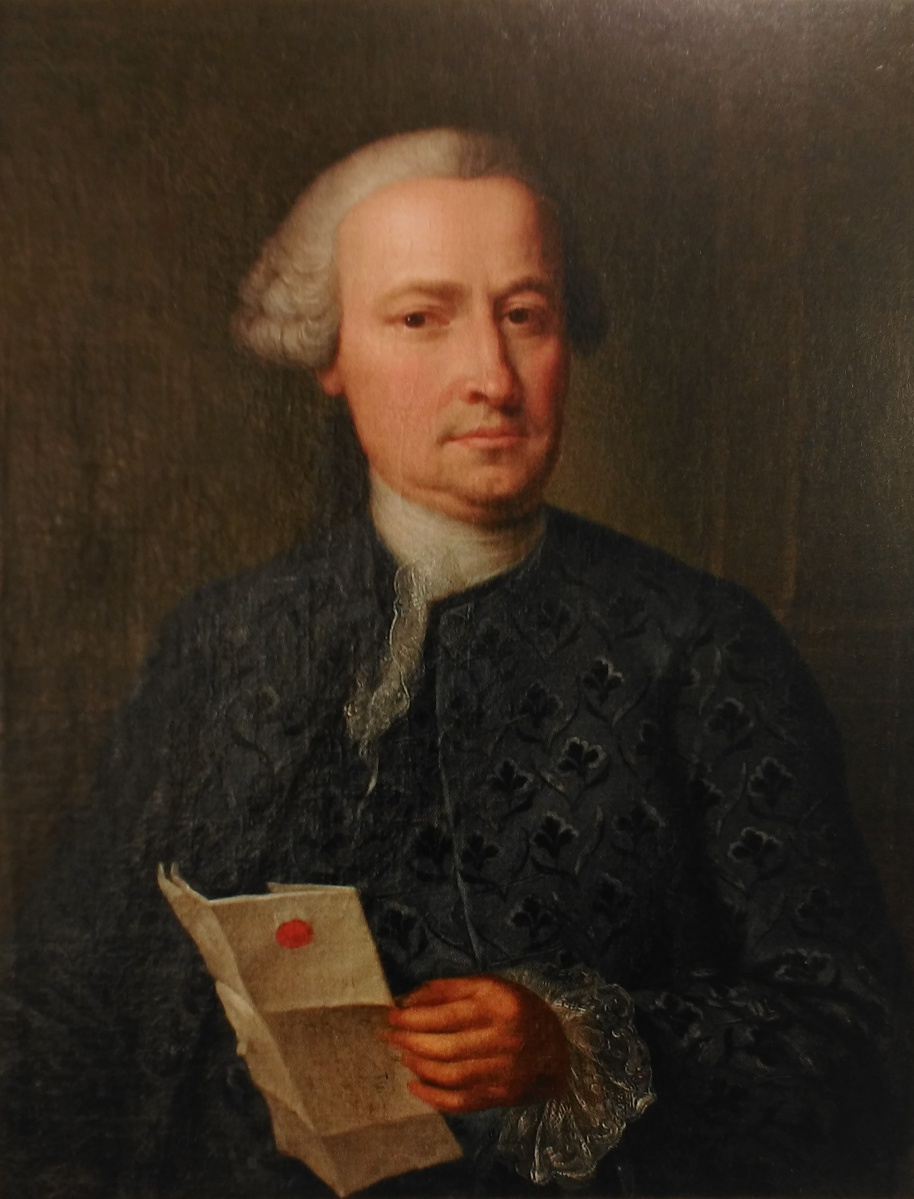
Reinhard Iselin painted by Georg Mathias Fuchs, 1766

The estate was founded by Baron Reinhard von Iselin, a prosperous, Swiss-born merchant and ship-owner from Copenhagen, who acquired the land in 1774 when the Crown sold Vordingborg Cavalry District in auction. From 1776 to 1777 he constructed a large farm complex around an octagonal courtyard with the assistance of the architect Christian Joseph Zuber.

Iselin's daughter, Anna Elizabeth, inherited Rosenfeldt in 1781. In 1777 she had married the French-born nobleman Antoine de Bosc de la Calmette who was appointed prefect of Møn in 1783 where he owned Marienborg and founded the Liselund estate, which he named after his wife.

=== Changing owners, 1803–1844 ===
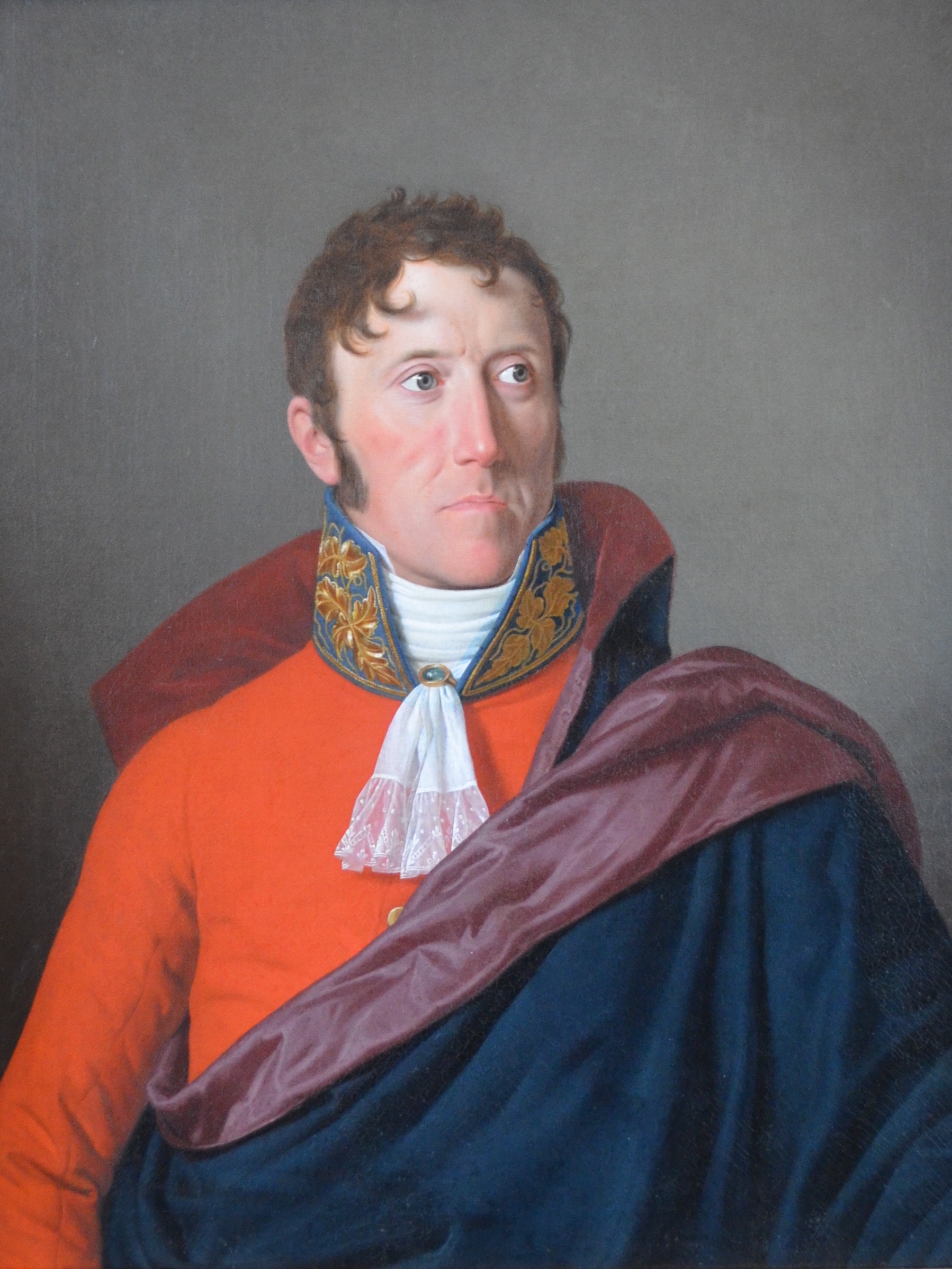
Frederik Hoppe

In 1803, Jens Lind purchased Rosenfeldt and the other Iselin estates. Later in the same year, he sold Rosenfeldt to Frederik Hoppe. In 1805, Hoppe sold the estate to Rasmus Lange (1777–1848) and Frederik Ludvig Hastrup for 300,000 rigsdaler. He later purchased Løvegård and Søbygaard near Kalundborg. Lange and Hastrup were both from Funen. In 1809, Lange sold his share of the estate to Hastrup and bought Ørbæklunde from his father.

After the death of his first wife, Hastrup was married to Anna Elisabeth née Hegelund, 34 years his junior, with whom he had two daughters. In 1844, he sold the estate and moved to Copenhagen. The family was based in an apartment in Kvæsthusgade at the time of the 1845 census.

=== Oxholm family ===
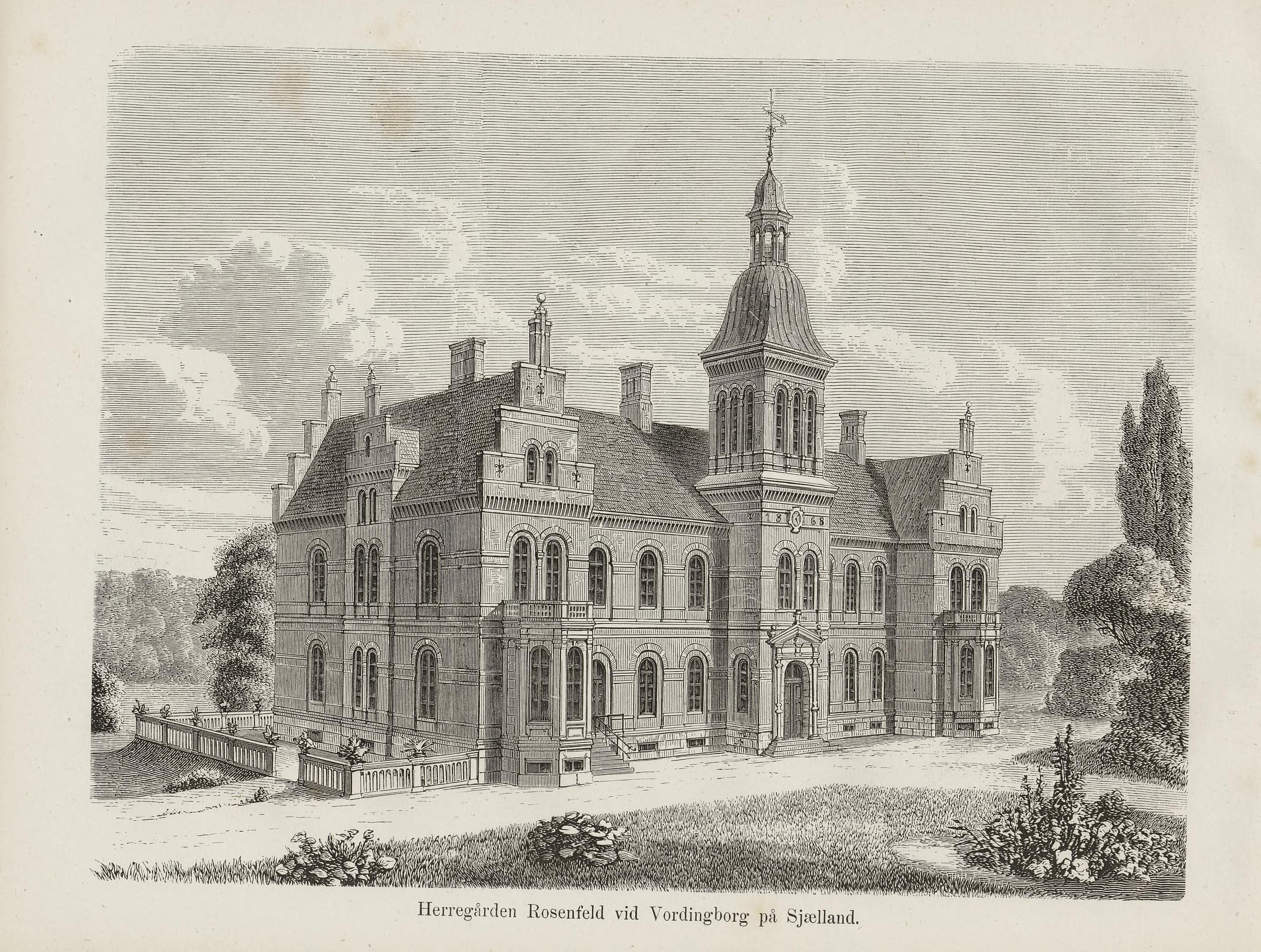
Rosenfeldt

In 1844 the estate was acquired by captain, general-major Oscar O'Neill Oxholm. He lived on the estate with his Irish wife Adelaide Maria O'Kelly. Oxholm constructed the new main building, two farm buildings and 20 tenant farms. Designed by Henrik Steffens Sibbern, the main building was built from 1868 to 1870.

== Architecture ==
Rosenfeldt's buildings are arranged around seven of eight sides of Zuber's octagonal courtyard, a layout which is reminiscent of that of Amalienborg in Copenhagen. Zuber's original farm complex consists of four low pavilions and two tall stable buildings in Neoclassical style. The plan also reserved a site for the main building which was not built until 1870. Sibbern's main building is constructed in red brick and designed in a Neo-Renaissance style. It consists of a two-story main wing with a tower flanked by two short lateral wings.

== Rosenfeldt Manor today ==
Rosenfeldt Manor is owned by Peter Oxholm Tillisch. It covers 2,313 hectares (1998).

== List of owners ==
Old plan of the octagonal complex and garden from before 1820.

- (–1774) The Crown
- (1774–1781) Reinhard Iselin
- (1781–1781) Anna Elisabeth 1) Iselin, 2) Classen, née Fabritius-Tengnagel
- (1781–1803) P.G.A. Bosc de la Calmette
- (1803) Jens Lind
- (1803–1805) Frederik Hoppe
- (1805–1809) Rasmus Lange
- (1805–1844) Frederik Ludvig Hastrup
- (1844–1871) Oscar O'Neill Oxholm
- (1871–1882) Adelaide Maria Oxholm née O'Kelly
- (1882–1914) Carl Arthur George O'Neill Oxholm
- (1914–1935) Sophie Marguerite Oxholm née Bech
- (1935–1949) Oscar O'Neill Oxholm
- (1949–1991) Elsa S.S. Tillisch née Oxholm
- (1991–present) Oscar Peter Oxholm Tillisch
