= Sophie Oxholm =

Danish exhibition organizer (1848–1935)

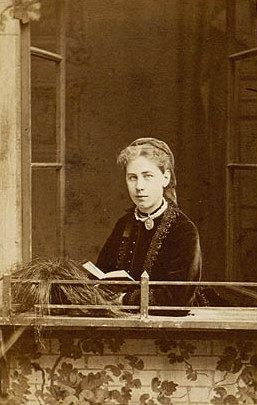
Sophie Oxholm

Sophie Marguerite Oxholm née Bech (25 December 1848 – 3 September 1935) was a Danish noblewoman who was active in the initial planning of the 1895 Copenhagen Women's Exhibition. She was the owner of Rosenfeldt at Vordingborg from 1914 to 1935.

== Early life and family ==
Born on 25 December 1848 in Poughkeepsie, New York State, Sophie Oxholm Bech was the daughter of the Danish consul, Edvard Bech (1812–1873), and Charlotte Elizabeth née McCarthy (1812–1900). On 9 September 1892, she married the estate owner and nobleman Carl O'Neill Oxholm of Rosenfeldt (1843–1914), a son of Maj. Gen. Oscar O'Neill Oxholm.

== The Women's Exhibition in Copenhagen ==
Oxholm, who had visited the 1893 World's Fair in Chicago, was impressed by its presentations, especially the show of Danish needlework. On her return to Denmark, she immediately brought a number of influential women together with a view to arranging a Nordic women's exhibition in Copenhagen the following year. Despite initial enthusiasm, as a result of budgetary and management problems, it was announced in February 1894 that the exhibition would not be held until 1895.

After experiencing difficulty in managing the arrangements, Oxholm gave up her position as head of the coordinating committee in early 1895. She was replaced by Bertha Buch of the Women's Society but it was Emma Gad (1852–1921) who took care of the practical arrangements..

== Late life ==
Oxholm fell into financial difficulties after her husband's death in 1914 and declared bankruptcy. She died on 3 September 1935.
