= Battle of Køge =

1807 battle of the Gunboat War

- Part of the Gunboat War
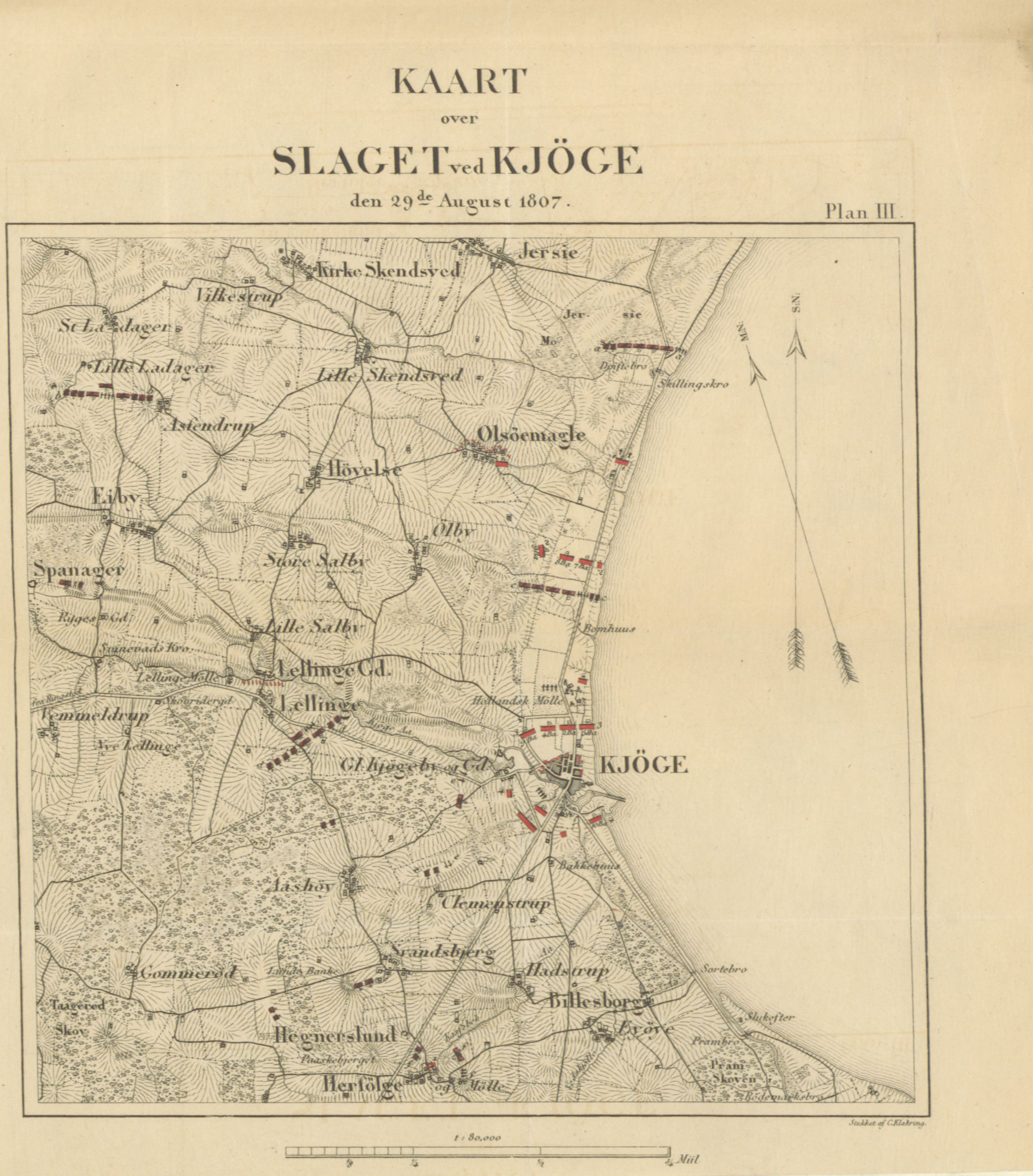
- 1845 map of the battle
Date	29 August 1807
Location	Køge, Denmark–Norway 55°27′22″N 12°10′47″E
Result	British victory

Belligerents
United Kingdom	Denmark–Norway

Commanders and leaders
Arthur Wellesley	Joachim Castenschiold; Peter Oxholm (POW)

Strength
6,000 infantry 1,620 cavalry 12 guns	7,000 militia infantry 150 cavalry 13 guns

Casualties and losses
29 killed 122 wounded 21 missing	152 killed 204 wounded 1,700 captured

The Battle of Køge was fought on 29 August 1807 between British troops besieging Copenhagen and Danish militia raised on Sjælland as part of the Gunboat War. It ended in a British victory and is also known as 'Træskoslaget' or 'the Clogs Battle', since many of the Danish militiamen threw their heavy wooden clogs away when they were fleeing.

== Background ==
The British government feared the Danish fleet was about to fall into French hands and thus delivered Denmark–Norway an ultimatum to sail its fleet to Britain or face war with Britain. The Danish government refused so British troops landed at Vedbæk on 16 August and began an investment on Copenhagen. Joachim Castenschiold was ordered to create a frikorps and lift the investment. Castenschiold's forces concentrated themselves around Roskilde and Lejre, while general Oxholm was sent south to activate the Søndre Sjællandske Landeværnsregiment. Castenschiold arrived at Køge on 26 August and two days later he was joined by Oxholm and his force. This gave Castenschiold a grand total of around 7,000 militiamen, 600 cavalry, and 13 cannon. In the meantime, the British headquarters at Copenhagen had become aware of the Danish militia's mobilization and on 27 August general Arthur Wellesley (later 1st Duke of Wellington) was ordered to locate and defeat it.

== Battle ==
Wellesley's 6,000-man Anglo-German infantry force included the 1st Battalion of the 43rd Foot, the 2nd Battalion of the 52nd Foot, the 1st Battalion of the 92nd Foot, five companies from the 1st and 2nd Battalions of the 95th Foot, and the 6th Line Battalion King's German Legion. Three squadrons each of the 1st, 2nd and 3rd King's German Legion Hussar Regiments totaled 1,620 cavalrymen. The eight 6-pound cannons and two 5.5-inch howitzers were served by Newhouse's battery of the Royal Horse Artillery and Sympher's half-battery of the King's German Legion. Colonel Wilhelm von Linsingen was Wellesley's brigade commander.

Castenschiold's force was made up of 7,000 infantry in 11 battalions, 150 cavalry in two squadrons, and 120 artillerists serving nine guns. The foot soldiers were organized into the 5th, 6th and 7th Battalions of the North Zealand Landværn, the 1st, 2nd, 4th, 5th, 7th, 8th, 9th and 10th Battalions of the South Zealand Landværn. There were 70 horsemen from the Zealand Cavalry Regiment and 80 mounted troops from the Landværn Cavalry.

== Aftermath ==
In the period from 15 to 31 August, British losses numbered 29 killed, 122 wounded, and 21 missing. The Danes lost two officers killed and four wounded, while their rank and file suffered 150 killed and 200 wounded. Their greatest loss was in prisoners. The British captured over 1,700 Danish troops, including Oxholm, nine majors, 19 captains and 28 lieutenants. They also captured all nine Danish artillery pieces, one colour and 68 wagons.

== Sources ==
- Smith, Digby (1998). The Greenhill Napoleonic Wars Data Book. Greenhill Books. ISBN 9781853672767.
- (in Danish)
