= Peter Lotharius Oxholm =

Danish army officer and governor-general

Peter Oxholm
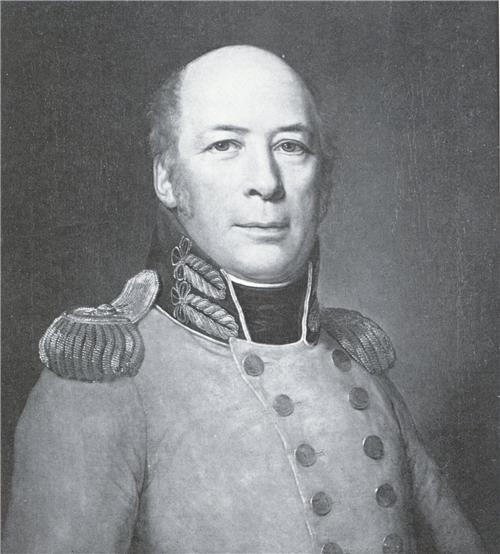
- Oxholm c. 1800
- Born: 10 July 1753; Copenhagen, Denmark
- Died: 27 July 1827 (aged 74)
- Military career
- Allegiance: Denmark–Norway
- Branch: Royal Danish Army
- Service years: 1763–1797, 1801–1807
- Rank: Colonel
- Unit: Militia
- Commands: Søndre Sjællandske Landeværnsregiment
- Conflicts: Napoleonic Wars; Battle of Køge

Governor-General of the Danish West Indies
- In office 1 April 1815 – 1 May 1816
- Preceded by: Under British occupation
- Succeeded by: Johan Henrik von Stabel

Peter Lotharius Oxholm (10 July 1753 – 27 July 1827) was a Danish army officer and governor-general of the Danish West Indies from 1815 to 1816. He also participated in the Battle of Køge against the British troops in 1807.

In 1814, Oxholm was appointed governor-general of the Danish West Indies.

== Early life ==
Oxholm was born on 10 July 1753 in Copenhagen, the son of krigsråd Lorentz Oxholm (died 1768) and Marie Susanne Oxgilm (née Schultz; 1730–1782). His father worked as mønsterskriver at Holmen.

== Military career ==
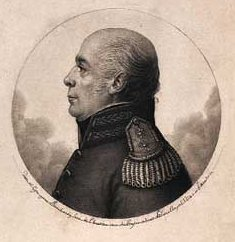
P.L. Oxholm

Oxholm enrolled as a cadet in 1763 and was made corporal in 1769. From 1771 Oxholm was page to Queen Carolina Mathilda, and he was present at her arrest in 1772. After having served in Denmark, he left for the Danish West Indies as a lieutenant in 1777.

Oxholm returned to Denmark in 1797 and was dismissed from the army with the rank of colonel. During the English Wars, Oxholm became leader of a regiment (Søndre Sjællandske Landeværnsregiment – the Regiment of Southern Zealand in English) in the militia created in 1801. This militia participated in the Battle of Køge, where Oxholm together with a handful of soldiers barricaded themselves in the cemetery at Herfølge, a small town in the middle of Zealand. After a brief and intense battle, they were forced to surrender and were taken prisoner.

== Plantation owner ==
Once Oxholm arrived on the island of Saint Croix, he became a planter, purchasing enslaved Africans to work on plantations on the island. From 1782 onwards, Oxholm also became involved in the Danish slave trade; protesting against its abolition and attempting to "get the trade extended beyond the ban of 1803".

He was the owner of the St. George Hill, Sally's Fancy, Concordia (East), and Hope plantations.

== Personal life and property ==
Oxholm was first married to Marie Heiliger, who died in 1794, and later to Ann O'Neill (3 February 1780 – 16 August 1844), daughter of a plantation owner on St. Croix.

He purchased a mansion at the corner of Sankt Annæ Gade and Amaliegade in 1808. He also owned the country house Aldershvile north of Copenhagen.
