= Rasmus Langeland =

Rasmus Langeland may refer to:

- Rasmus Langeland, a businessman in Korsør, Denmark
- Rasmus Langeland (1767–1837), businessman in Copenhagen, Denmark.
- Rasmus Langeland Bagger (1764–1819), chief of police and burgermaster in Copenhagen, Denmark
- Rasmus Olsen Langeland (1873[–1954), Norwegian politician
