= Doctor's House, Skælskør =

Historic building in Denmark

Doctor's House
- Lægeboligen
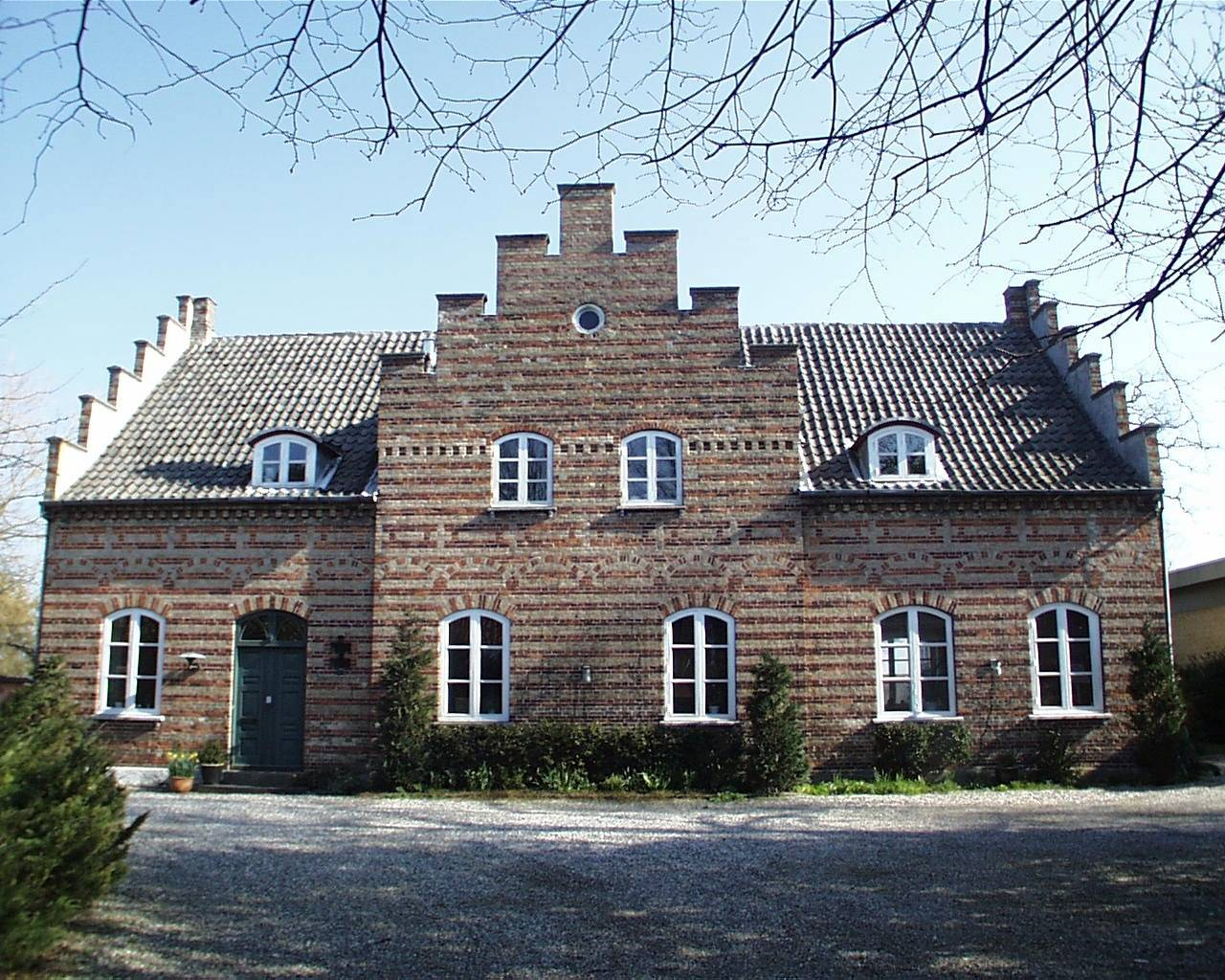
- Interactive map of the Doctor's House area

General information
- Location: Skælskør, Slagelse Municipality, Skovvej, 4230 Skælskør, Denmark
- Coordinates: 55°15′18.29″N 11°17′13.81″E
- Completed: 1856

The Doctor's House (Danish: Lægeboligen), situated at Skovvej 5, with views of Skælskør Nor, is the former residence of the district physician of Skælskør, Denmark. The building was constructed in 1856 to designs by Gottlieb Bindesbøll. The building was constructed in 1856 to designs by Gottlieb Bindesbøll It was listed on the Danish registry of protected buildings and places in 1992. An outhouse and the garden that slopes down towards the coast are also comprised by the heritage listing.

== History ==
The building was constructed for district physician Frederik Christian Krebs in 1856. In 1855, he had taken over the position as district physician of Skælskør. He had previously served in a similar position on the island of Læsø.

Krebs was married to the writer Anna Margrethe Borch (1818-1891). They lived in the house with their two children. The son Carl Krebs would become an actuary. The daughter Johanne Cathrine Krebs would become a painter.

In 1857, Krebs was instrumental in combatting the 1857 cholera outbreak. He was interested in politics, sociology and economy. In 1869, he published For Idé og Virkelighed in which he wrote about the emerging labour movement and argued in favour of improving the conditions for members of the working class. It was later followed by a number of other economic publications.

Kreds moved away when he was appointed as Chief Physician (stiftslæge) of Funen in 1871. The house was the same year sold to C. Raffn.

The building was listed on the Danish registry of protected buildings and places in 1992.

== Architecture ==
The building is constructed with alternating horizontal bands of red and yellow bricks. It is finished by crow-stepped gables at the end. The facade features a central, two-bay avant-corps which is also tipped by a crow-stepped gable. The horizontal red and yellow bands and the crow-stepped gables were features also seen in many of Bindesbøll's earlier works, including Jydske Asyl, Thisted Town Hall, Hobro Church, Nykøbing Bishop's House and the Mother Hage House on Møn. To the northeast of the building stands a small outhouse.

== List of owners ==
- 856-1871: F.C. Krebs
- 1871-1890: C. Raffn
- 1890-1927: C. Petersen Viuff
- 1927-1965: J.E. Heilmann
- 1965-1988: K.L. Dahlgren
- 1988-1991: J.T. Bardram
- 1991- : Arne Brandtoft and Kit Egefjord

== See also ==
- Source
