= Listed buildings in Slagelse Municipality =

This is a list of listed buildings in Slagelse Municipality, Denmark.

== Listed buildings ==
=== 4200 Slagelse ===
Listing name	Image	Location	Coordinates	Description
Acciseboden, Slagelse		Bjergbygade 11, 4200 Slagelse	55°24′0.07″N 11°21′10.17″E	Half-timbered building from 1783, probably designed by J.F. Bonier.
Brænderigården		Slotsgade 53, 4200 Slagelse	55°23′56.87″N 11°21′32.64″E	Building from 1810.
Englænder Jernbanebroen		Strandvejen 0, 4200 Slagelse	55°23′58.9″N 11°18′23.36″E	Three-arched railway bridge from 1853.
Vedbysønder Rytterskole		Vedbysøndervej 1, 4200 Slagelse	55°25′4.88″N 11°26′23″E	
Falkensteen		Falkensteenvej 20, 4200 Slagelse	55°21′27.78″N 11°22′2.7″E	Manor house from 1775.
Gyldenholm		Gyldenholmvej 8, 4200 Slagelse	55°20′25.93″N 11°27′46″E	Manor house from 1863-64 by Johan Daniel Herholdt.
Kirkerup Church Barn Kirkerup Kirkelade		Esholtevej 2A, 4200 Slagelse		Church barn from 1450-1500.
Skovsgård Mølle		Fladholtevej 6, 4200 Slagelse	55°20′33.86″N 11°29′2.62″E	Smock mill from c. 1820.
Slagelse Hospital		Bredegade 7A, 4200 Slagelse	55°24′5.63″N 11°21′7.52″E	
Slagelse Hospital		Bredegade 7C, 4200 Slagelse	55°24′4.34″N 11°21′7.91″E	
Slagelse Hospital		Bredegade 7D, 4200 Slagelse	55°24′4.54″N 11°21′6.4″E	
Slagelse Hospital		Bredegade 7F, 4200 Slagelse	55°24′5.03″N 11°21′6.11″E	
Slagelse railway station		Sdr. Stationsvej 28A, 4200 Slagelse	55°24′26.19″N 11°20′56.34″E	Station building from 1891-92 by N.P.C. Holsøe.
Sorterup Church Barn; Sorterup Kirkelade		Sorterup Kirkevej 2B, 4200 Slagelse	55°26′57.22″N 11°26′24.66″E	Half-timbered church barn from the beginning of the 19th century.
Store Frederikslund		Store Frederikslund 1, 4200 Slagelse	55°26′31.77″N 11°27′46.81″E	
Sørbymagle Andelsmejeri		Sørby Hovedgade 24A, 4200 Slagelse	55°21′34.01″N 11°26′24.19″E	
Slagelse Latin School		Rosengade 4B, 4200 Slagelse	55°24′12.98″N 11°21′14″E	Former Latin school from c. 1500.
Valbygård		Valbygårdsvej 94, 4200 Slagelse	55°25′34.51″N 11°18′20.67″E	Manor house from 1853-55 by L.A. Winstrup with extension from 1884.
Ågård		Næsbyvej 24, 4200 Slagelse	55°24′2.55″N 11°15′31.25″E	

=== 4220 Korsør ===
Listing name	Image	Location	Coordinates	Description
Acciseboden, Korsør		Skovvej 2A, 4220 Korsør	55°19′34.46″N 11°8′29.9″E	
Algade 18		Algade 18A, 4220 Korsør	55°19′41.47″N 11°8′23.32″E	House from c. 1860.
Algade 22		Algade 22A, 4220 Korsør	55°19′42.1″N 11°8′22.33″E	House from c. 1860-
Algade 27		Algade 27A, 4220 Korsør	55°19′41.76″N 11°8′21.63″E	House from c. 1860.
Halsskov Kulfyr		Lygtebakken 19, 4220 Korsør	55°20′15.46″N 11°7′30.56″E	Lighthouse from 1801 by Joseph Guione.
Halskov Revhus		Storebæltsvej 140, 4220 Korsør	55°20′54.87″N 11°5′42.08″E	Ice boat station from 1838 .
Kongegården		Algade 25A, 4220 Korsør	55°19′41.32″N 11°8′22.41″E	House from 1761.
Korsør Fortress		Søbatteriet 7, 4220 Korsør	55°20′2.38″N 11°8′13.25″E	
Korsør Fortress		Søbatteriet 9, 4220 Korsør	55°20′1.41″N 11°8′14.02″E	Brick tower from 1200-1400.
Korsør Fortress		Søbatteriet 11, 4220 Korsør	55°20′1.51″N 11°8′15.08″E	
Korsør railway station		Gl. Banegårdsplads 7, 4220 Korsør	55°20′11.33″N 11°8′15.39″E	Kiosk building from 1906 by Heinrich Wenck.
Korsør railway station		Gl. Banegårdsplads 10, 4220 Korsør	55°20′9.49″N 11°8′12.28″E	Kiosk building from 1906 by Heinrich Wenck.
Korsør Town Hall and Jail		Torvet 1, 4220 Korsør	55°19′46.38″N 11°8′12.95″E	
Sprogø Lighthouse; Sprogø Fyr		Sprogø 3, 4220 Korsør	55°19′50.46″N 10°58′10.33″E	
Stapel House; Stapels Gård		Algade 31A, 4220 Korsør	55°19′42.97″N 11°8′18.76″E	Manor house from 1667.
Stapel House; Stapels Gård		Algade 31D, 4220 Korsør	55°19′42.42″N 11°8′18.9″E	Side wing.
Tårnborg		Tårnborgvej 152, 4220 Korsør	55°20′45.06″N 11°8′33.39″E	
Tårnborg		Ørnumvej 4, 4220 Korsør	55°20′47.44″N 11°8′30.92″E	
Tårnholm		Marsk Stigs Vej 150, 4220 Korsør	55°20′38.06″N 11°12′50.65″E	
Tårnholm		Marsk Stigs Vej 150A, 4220 Korsør	55°20′35.49″N 11°12′51.05″E	

=== 4230 Skælskør ===
Listing name	Image	Location	Coordinates	Description
Borreby		Borrebyvej 45, 4230 Skælskør	55°13′56.47″N 11°17′24.89″E	Protected 1918.
Borreby		Borrebyvej 47, 4230 Skælskør	55°13′57.34″N 11°17′26.9″E	Main building.
Borreby		Borrebyvej 49, 4230 Skælskør	55°13′55.75″N 11°17′27.05″E	East wing.
Borreby		Borrebyvej 53, 4230 Skælskør	55°13′56.52″N 11°17′20.6″E	Equestrianism school building.
Doctor's House		Skovvej 6, 4230 Skælskør	55°15′18.3″N 11°17′13.84″E	House from 1856 designed by Gottlieb Bindesbøll.
Doctor's House		Skovvej 6, 4230 Skælskør	55°15′18.3″N 11°17′13.84″E	Outhouse
Havnevej 5		Havnevej 5, 4230 Skælskør	55°15′14.32″N 11°17′31.32″E	Two-storey building from 1849.
Husene ved broen		Havnevej 1, 4230 Skælskør	55°15′15.09″N 11°17′32.13″E	
Husene ved broen		Havnevej 3, 4230 Skælskør	55°15′14.72″N 11°17′31.69″E	
Kanehøj Mølle		Kanehøj-Møllevej 53, 4230 Skælskør	55°16′10.74″N 11°19′32.54″E	
Kirkerup Church Barn		Esholtevej 2A, 4200 Slagelse	55°21′29.29″N 11°29′35.51″E	
Købmandsgården		Algade 11A, 4230 Skælskør	55°15′13.29″N 11°17′33.91″E	
Købmandsgården		Algade 11B, 4230 Skælskør	55°15′13.98″N 11°17′34.22″E	
Købmandsgården		Algade 11C, 4230 Skælskør	55°15′14.22″N 11°17′34.29″E	From 1800.
Købmandsgården		Algade 11D, 4230 Skælskør	55°15′14.51″N 11°17′34.37″E	From 1800.
Købmandsgården		Algade 11E, 4230 Skælskør	55°15′14.78″N 11°17′34.42″E	From 1800.
Magleby Hospital		Vedskøllevej 4, 4230 Skælskør	55°13′57.87″N 11°19′13.51″E	Building from the Middle Ages which was altered in 1624 and 1758.
Nytorv 3		Nytorv 3A, 4230 Skælskør	55°15′17.09″N 11°17′50.44″E	
Nytorv 3		Nytorv 3B, 4230 Skælskør	55°15′12.92″N 11°17′32.5″E	
Peder Reedtz' House; Peder Reedtz' Gård		Algade 2, 4230 Skælskør	55°15′12.92″N 11°17′32.5″E	
Peder Reedtz' House; Peder Reedtz' Gård		Strandgade 1, 4230 Skælskør	55°15′12.4″N 11°17′32.15″E	
Rützow's House		Ørslevvej 240, 4230 Skælskør	55°13′28.35″N 11°25′51.64″E	Clay building from c. 1800.
Skælskør Latin School, Skælskør		Gammelgade 4, 4230 Skælskør	55°15′13.01″N 11°17′10.37″E	Building from c. 1525 (originally church barn).
Skælskør Town Hall		Gammeltorv 13, 4230 Skælskør	55°15′15.26″N 11°17′14.74″E	Combined town hall and courthouse from 1896 by F.C.C. Hansen.
Skælskør Steam Mill		Vestergade 1, 4230 Skælskør	55°15′14.01″N 11°17′27.06″E	Former steam mill from 1853.
Snedinge		Ørslevvej 230, 4230 Skælskør	55°13′29.87″N 11°25′35.44″E	
Snedinge Møllevej 5		Snedinge-Møllevej 5, 4230 Skælskør	55°14′17.64″N 11°25′32″E	
Vestergade 10		Vestergade 10, 4230 Skælskør	55°15′14.8″N 11°17′27.28″E	Half-timbered building from c. 1670.

=== 4242 Boeslunde ===
Listing name	Image	Location	Coordinates	Description
Espe		Espevej 56, 4242 Boeslunde	55°17′30.85″N 11°14′39.11″E	

=== 4243 Rude ===
Listing name	Image	Location	Coordinates	Description
Holsteinborg		Holsteinborgvej 130A, 4243 Rude	55°12′55.04″N 11°27′47.75″E	Four-winged 17th-century manor house.
Holsteinborg		Holsteinborgvej 130C, 4243 Rude	55°12′54.61″N 11°27′49.14″E	Four-winged 17th-century manor house.
