= Johanne Cathrine Krebs =

Danish painter and women's rights activist

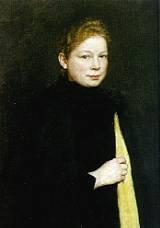
- self-portrait, c. 1890
- Born: 21 April 1848; Byrum, Læsø, Denmark
- Died: 1 April 1924 (aged 75); Copenhagen, Denmark
- Known for: Painting

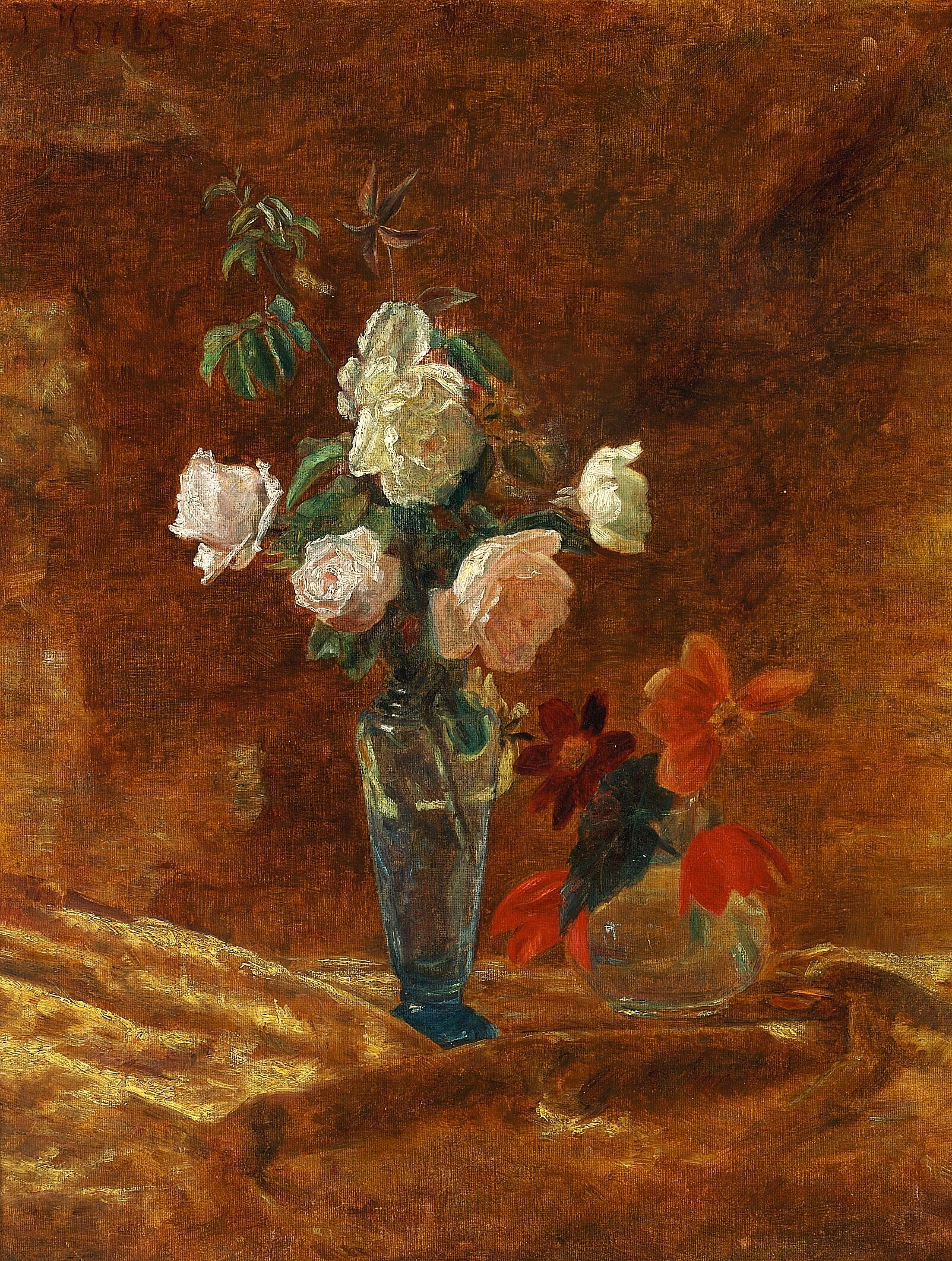
Arrangement with roses and other flowers in vases

Johanne Cathrine Krebs (21 April 1848 – 1 April 1924) was a Danish painter and women's rights activist. She was known for her portrait painting. She was active in establishing the women's department of the Royal Danish Academy of Fine Arts.

== Biography ==
Krebs was born in Byrum in the small island of Læsø. Her father served as district physician on the island. They left the island when the father took over the position as district physician of Skælskør. They resided in the Doctor's House at Skovvej 5 from 1756. The house was designed by Gottlieb Bindesbøll, one of the leading Danish architect of the time. Her father was friends with the painters P. C. Skovgaard (1817–1875) and Johan Thomas Lundbye (1818–1848) sparking her interest in painting. She became a student of P.C. Skovgaard from 1869 and 1871. At that time she was unable to enroll in the Royal Danish Academy of Fine Arts (Kongelige Danske Kunstakademi).

In early 1888 Krebs wrote an article for the Danish newspaper Politiken, stating that the existing, private Danish Women's Society's School for Women (Tegneskolen for Kvinders) was not a substitute for admitting women to the Royal Danish Academy of Fine Arts.

By late 1888 the Art Academy's Art School for Women (Kunstakademiets Kunstskole for Kvinder) opened, allowing women access to instruction at the academy. She and Augusta Dohlmann (1847–1914) were considered to have been the leaders in this movement. From 1888 to 1908, she held the position as the school's inspectorate.

From 1880 through 1895, Krebs exhibited at the Charlottenborg Spring Exhibition. From 1891 through 1924 she exhibited at the Free Exhibition (Den Frie Udstilling) of which she was a co-founder.

Krebs exhibited her work at the Palace of Fine Arts at the 1893 World's Columbian Exposition in Chicago, Illinois, and in 1900 at the Exposition Universelle, where she received a bronze medal.

She died in Copenhagen on 1 April 1924.
