= Tårnborg =

Manor house in Korsør, Denmark

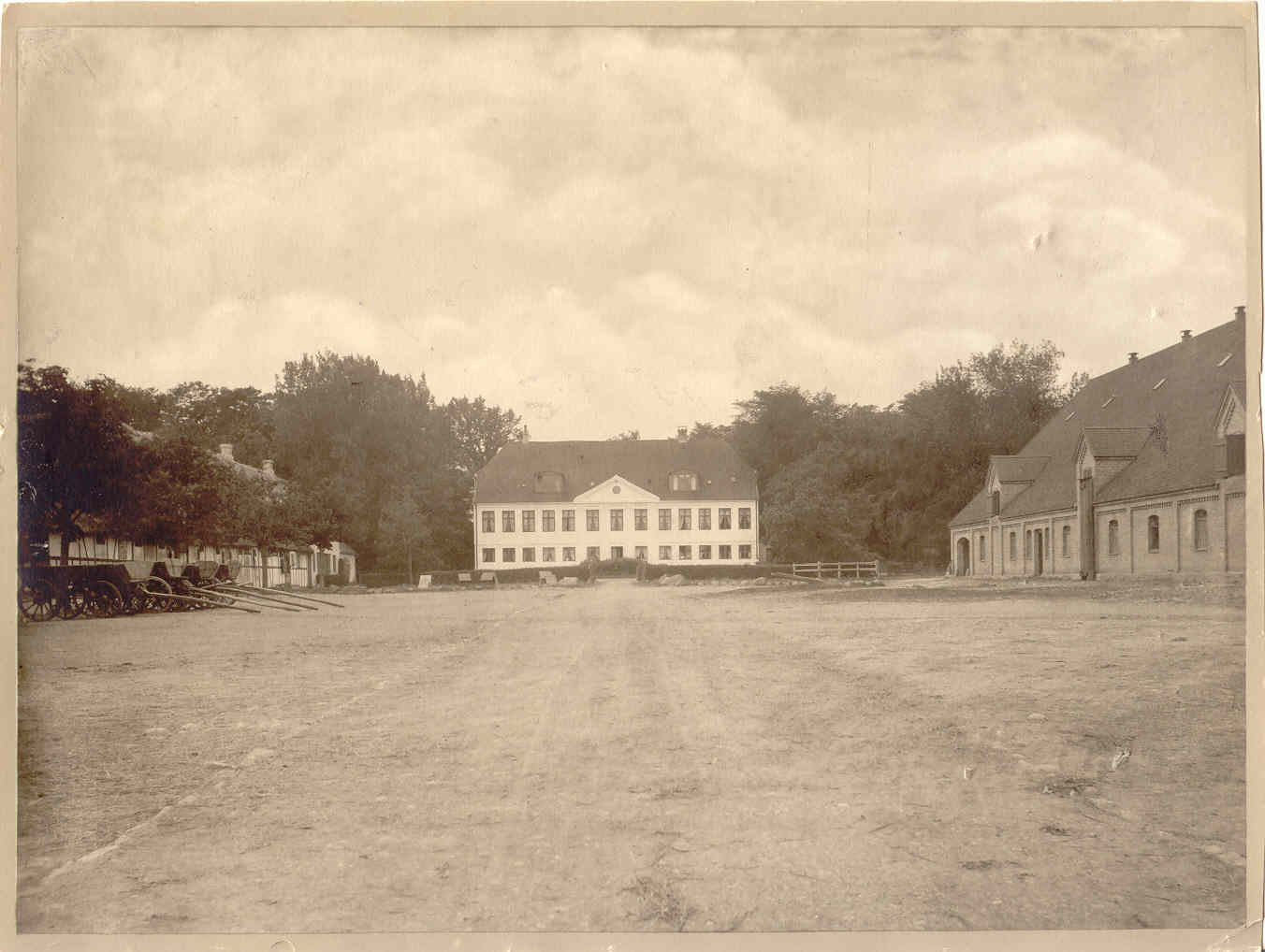
- Interactive map of the Tårnborg area

General information
- Architectural style: Neoclassical
- Location: Korsør, Slagelse Municipality, Tårnborgvej 152, 4220 Korsør, Denmark
- Coordinates: 55°20′45.17″N 11°8′33.54″E
- Completed: 1803

Tårnborg (or Taarnborg), from 1671 until 1841 known as Dyrehavegaard, is a former manor house in Korsør, Slagelse Municipality, Denmark. In 2002, it was bought by the labour union 3F and converted into a hotel and conference centre. For a while it was operated by Comwell Hotels under the name Comwell Grand Park Hotel. In 2025, it was acquired by Jehovah's Witnesses and will be converted into a religious educational centre for the movement's European chapters. The Neoclassical main building from 1803 and the manager's house (forpagterboligen) from 1843 were listed on the Danish registry of protected buildings and places in 1982.

== History ==
=== Origins ===
Tårnborg was originally the name of a small fortified town whose fortifications were most likely constructed by Svend Grathe in the middle of the 12th century. After Grathe's death, Tårnborg Castle was part of Valdemar I's crown land but lost its military importance when Korsør Castle was built. Tårnborg Castle's home farm (ladegård) was from then on known as Korsør Castle's home farm. In 1458, Christian I allowed the farmers in the new town of Korsør to use the land for grazing in return for the payment of an annual fee. Korsør Castle's home farm was destroyed during the Second Northern War (1657–1660).

=== Dyrehovedgaard, 1671–1841 ===
In 1662, Hugo Lützow proposed to give the land to townspeople of Slagelse who were willing to move to Korsør. The proposal was approved but never realized, and in 1669, part of the land was instead acquired by Hugo Lützow (32 tønder hartkorn). The rest of the land (Stubager and Stibjerg, 25 tønder hartkorn) was sold to Han Jørgensen in 1671. Shortly thereafter, Jørgen also bought Lützow's share of the land and renamed the estate Dyrehovedgård.

Hans Jørgensen served as mayor of Korsør until his death in 1684. The next owners of Dyrehovedgaard were Jokum Brorsen (pastor of Randlev Parish), Eiler Jacobsen (assessor in konsistorialkollegiet), Christian Schnitler (merchant from Copenhagen) and Anders Trolle (owner of Hellestrup).

In 1709, Dyrehovedgaard was acquired by Ulrich Mogensen. He had previously leased Brahetrolleborg on Funen. The land was supposed to be returned to the Crown in 1719 for inclusion in Antvorskov Cavalry District, but after a personal meeting with Frederick IV, Mogensen was allowed to keep the estate. At the time of his death, its size had grown to 204 tønder hartkorn.

In 1741, Mogensen's widow sold Dyrehovedgård to Poul Hein. He continued the work with expanding the estate through the acquisition of more land. In 1749, it had finally reached the size of a "complete manor", or seat (sædegård), meaning that it comprised copyholds with a total area of more than 200 tønder hartkorn, a status that was rewarded with tax exemptions and other privileges.

In 1766, Dyrehovedgård was acquired by Christian Eggers. He had previously served as manager of Dragsholm at Kalundborg. In 1774 Eggers purchased one of the nine estates that was sold in public auction when Antvorskov Cavalry District was dissolved. The estate was called Tårnborg after the old fortification but Eggers instantly renamed it Tårnholm. On Eggers' death in 1791, Dyrehavegaard and Tårnholm both passed to his son Niels Christian Eggers. He Kept Durehavegaard while Tårnholm was sold after just one year in his ownership.

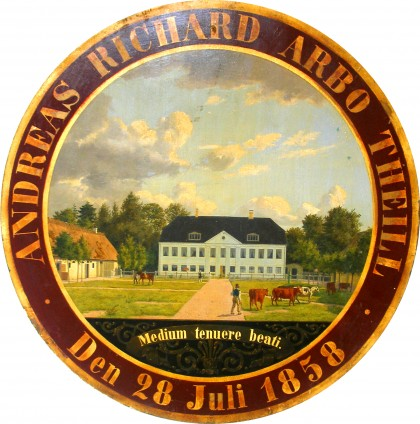
Tårnborg seen on Andreas Richard Arbo Theill's ceremonial target from the Royal Copenhagen Shooting Society

Niels Christian Eggers was like many other estate owners hit by the economic downturn that followed the state bankruptcy of 1813. In 1821, Dyrehovedgård was taken over by the Crown when he was unable to pay his taxes. In 1823, Dyrehovedgård was sold in a public auction. That buyer was Frederik Theill, a merchant from Korsør. Part of the land was acquired by Count Frederik Adolf Holstein-Holsteinborg and placed under Holsteinsborg. Theill's widow Anna Cathrine Hansen kept the estate when he died the following year. In 1834, she ceded it to their son Andreas Richard Theil.

In 1838, Andreas Richard Theil sold Dyrehovedgård to Ferdinand Ree from Hamburg.

=== Tårnholm, 1841–present ===
In 1841, Dyrehovedgård changed hands again when the estate was acquired by Waldemar Tully Oxholm. He had close ties to Christian IX by whom he was appointed to the Danish Constituent Assembly, and he was a member of Landstinget from 1849 to 1853. In 1846, Oxholm renamed his estate Tårnborg. He increased the size of the estate through land reclamation along the coastline and convinced the railway commission that the new Korsør Station should be located on his estate.

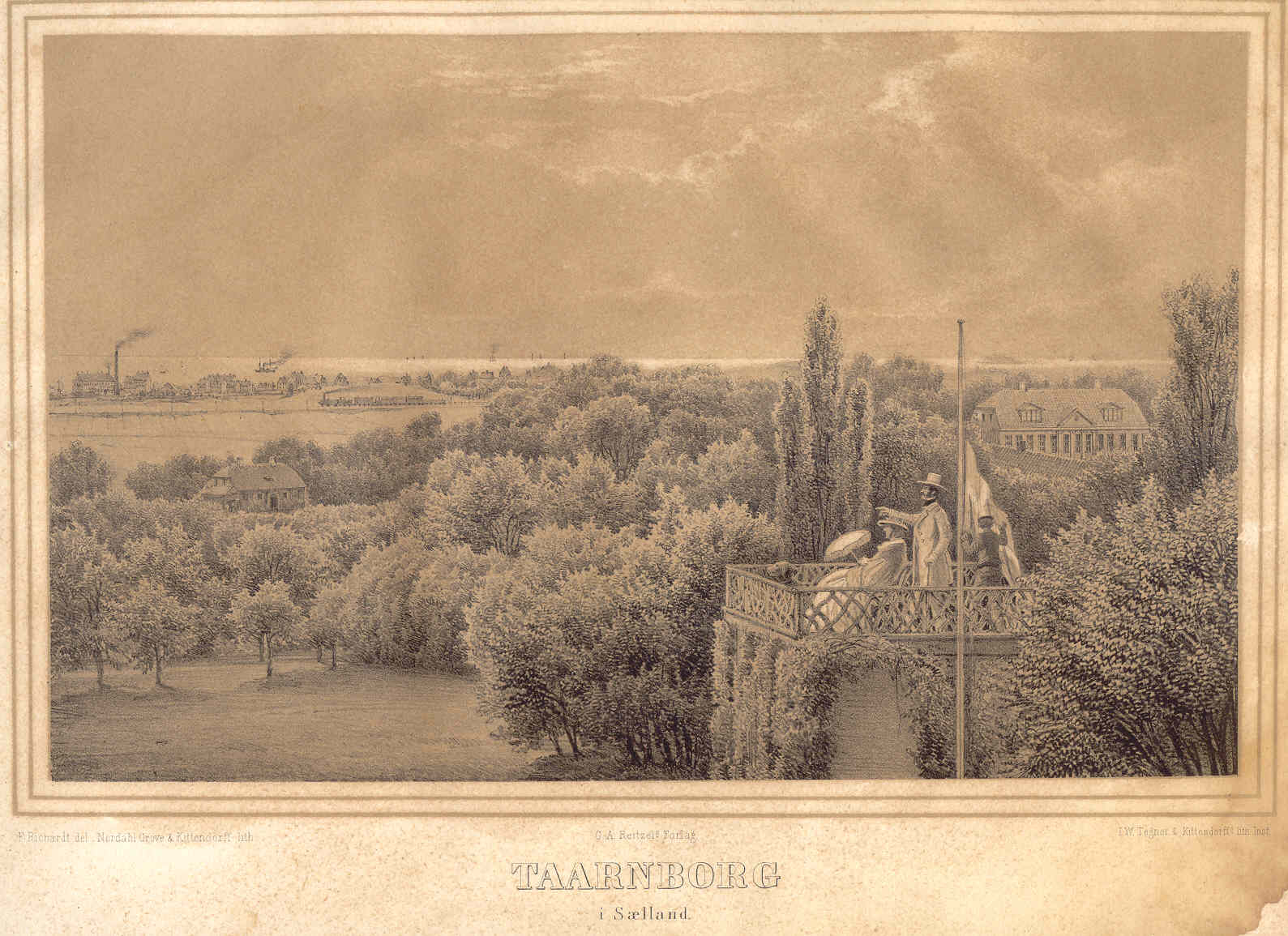
Tårnborg, c. 1860

In 1866, Oxholm sold Tårnborg to Jørgen Albert Bech. Bech was the brother of August Willads Bech, the owner of nearby Valbygård. After Jørgen Albert Bech's death, Tårnborg was passed down to his eldest son Edvard Bech. Most of the farm buildings were destroyed by fire in 1904. This prompted Edvard Bech to sell the estate to the town council. Tårnborg was later sold several times before once again being acquired by the Korsør Town Council in 1948.

In 2002, 3F bought the property and converted it into a hotel and conference centre. It was later managed by Comwell Hotels under the name Comwell Grand Park Hotel. The hotel had 1314 rooms, restaurant, spa and meeting facilities. In the first half of the 2020s, it was put up for sale for DKK 110 million. In 2026, it was sold to Jehovah's Witnesses.

== Today ==
The former hotel hotel and conference centre was acquired by Jehovah's Witnesses. It will be converted into a religious educational centre for the organisation's European chapters. The Neoclassical main building from 1803 and the manager's house (forpagterboligen) from 1843 were listed on the Danish registry of protected buildings and places in 1982.

== List of owners ==
List of owners:

- ( –1669) The Crown
- (1669–1671) Hugo Lützow
- (1671–1684) Hans Jørgensen
- (1684– ) Jokum Brorsen
- ( –1699) Eiler Jacobsen Eilert
- (1699– ) Christian Schnitler
- ( –1709) Anders Trolle
- (1709– ) Ulrich Mogensen
- ( –1741) Karen Mogensen
- (1741–1766) Poul Hein
- (1766–1793) Christian Eggers
- (1793–1821) Niels Christian Eggers
- (1821–1823) The Crown
- (1823–1824) Christian Ernst Frederik Theill
- (1824–1834) Anna Cathrine Theill, née Hansen
- (1834–1838) Andreas Richard Theill
- (1838–1841) Ferdinand Ree
- (1841–1866) Waldemar Tully Oxholm
- (1866–1876) Jørgen Albert Bech
- (1876–1901) Edvard Bech
- (1901–1904) Korsør Municipality
- (1904–1922) Peter Johansen Flach de Neergaard
- (1922–1935) P. Madelung
- (1922–1935) C.A. Madelung
- (1935–1948) N.V. Jørgensen
- (1948– ) Korsør Kommune
- (2002–2025) I/S Tårnborg Parkhotel
- (2026-) Jehovah's Witnesses
