= Rasmus Langeland Bagger =

Danish politician (1777–1856)

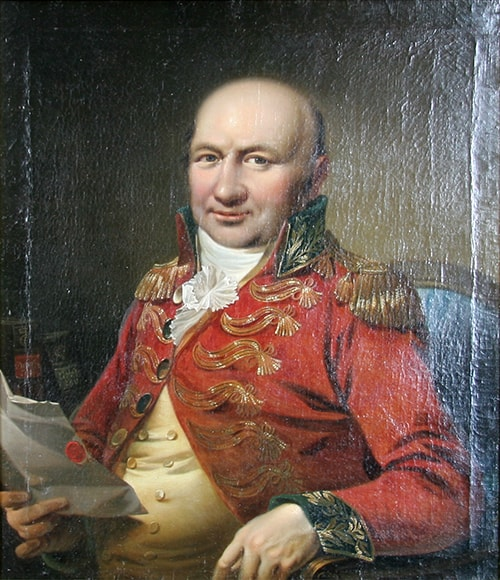
- Portrait of Bagger by C. A. Jensen in Copenhagen Police Headquarters.

Chief of Copenhagen Police Force
- In office 1809–1814
- Monarch: Frederick VI of Denmark
- Preceded by: Hans Haagen
- Succeeded by: Hans Haagen
- Constituency: Copenhagen Police Force

Personal details
- Born: 20 April 1764 Saltø, Denmark-Norway
- Died: 20 January 1819 (aged 54) Copenhagen, Denmark
- Occupation: Chief of police

Rasmus Langeland Bagger (20 April 1764 – 20 January 1819) served as chief of police in Copenhagen from 1809 to 1814.

== Early life and education ==
Bagger was born on 20 April 1764 at Saltø, the eldest of five children of Marcus Marcussen Bagger (d. 1770) and Hedevig Johanne Langeland (1740–1822). His father served as manager of the estate. His maternal grandfather was the businessman Rasmus Langeland, owner of Kongegården in Korsør, where the father would later serve as postmaster. The father's death left the mother alone with three children. Her brother died in the same year and her father went bankrupt in 1771. In 1774, she bought an inn at Slottensgade 82 in Korsør. She later also operated the local post office from the same building.

Bagger matriculated from Slagelse Latin School in 1783. He earned a law degree from the University of Copenhagen in 1789.

== Career ==
Bagger started his career as a volunteer in Danske Kancelli. He became a copyist in 1790 and was promoted to clerk (kancellist) in 1794. In 1796, he was appointed birk judge of Antvorskov Birk. From 1799, he concurrently served as birk scribe and councilman in Slagelse and, in 1794, he was appointed burgermaster in the same town.

In 1809, Bagger succeeded Hans Haagen as chief of police in Copenhagen. In connection with the resignation of his predecessor, the office was divided into a position as police chief and a position as president of the police court.

In 1814, Haagen was reinstalled as chief of police and Bagger was instead appointed as 1st burgermaster.

== Personal life ==
On 25 January 1798, Bagger married Frederikke Gjersing (d. 1852) at Saint Michael's Church, Slagelse. Bagger was a life-long friend of the poet Jens Baggesen. They met each other as children in Korsør and later went to school together in Slagelse. Bagger died on 20 January 1819. He is buried at Assistens Cemetery.

== Awards ==
Bagger was appointed Kancelliraad in 1805, Justitsraad in 1809 and etatsråd in 1813.
