= Skælskør Steam Mill =

Former steam mill on the harbourfront in Skælskør, Denmark

- Skælskør Dampmølle
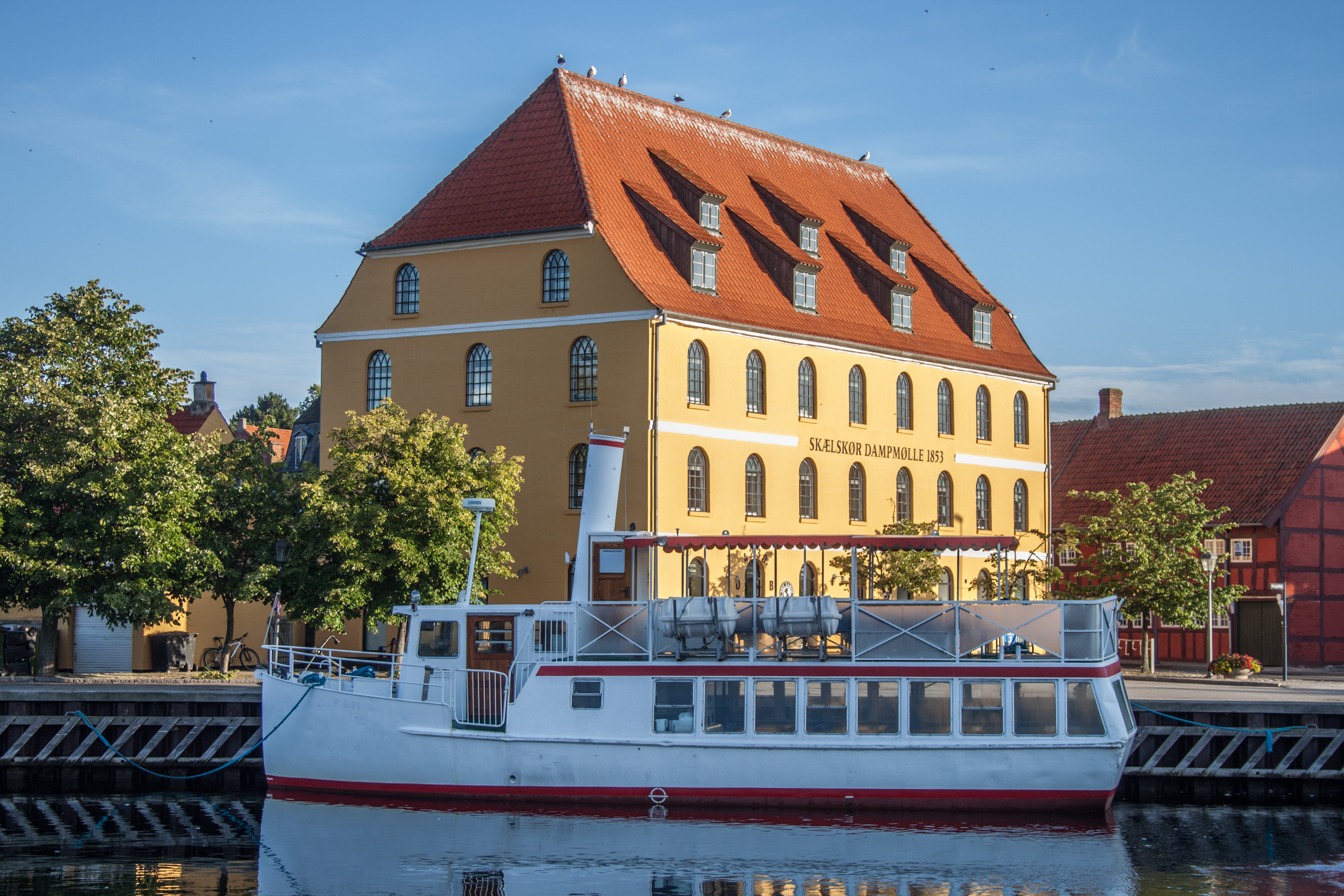
- Interactive map of the Skælskør Steam Mill area

General information
- Location: Skælskør, Slagelse Municipality, Vestergade 1, 4230 Skælskør, Denmark
- Coordinates: 55°15′14.33″N 11°17′27.02″E
- Completed: 1853
- Renovated: 1988-89

Skælskør Steam Mill (Danish: Skælskør Dampmølle) is a former steam mill on the harbourfront in Skælskør, Denmark. Built in 1853, it is described as one of the town's most well-known landmarks. It was listed in the Danish registry of protected buildings and places in 1978.

== History ==
=== Harboe family ===
The steam mill was built in 1853 for Niels Madsen Harboe (1786–1861), pastor of Nagleby, who was the owner of a distillery, two mills, a grain and grocery business as well as a large farm.

The steam mill contained a steam engine used for the processing of grain. The flour was either shipped off to Kalundborg or Vordingborg on smaller boats or by land on carriages to towns in the surrounding countryside.

The steam mill was later continued by Harboe's sons Søren and Rasmus Harboe. They were also active in the local shipping industry.

=== Later owners ===
The steam mill was later sold to merchant J. J. Rønne. He sold it to the H. C. Hansen owned company A/S H. C. Hansen. Hansen converted the building into a granary.

The building was in 1950 separated from the harbour by a new road to H. C. Hansen's coal depot. It was later until 1987 used as a gasoline depot by Mobil Oil.

Skælskør Steam Mill was later owned by Peter Nielsen through the real estate company Skælskør Ejendomme. In 2020, it was part of a portfolio of 16 properties sold to privately held real estate company Herbo.

== Today ==
The ground floor of the building is home to a café and a dental clinic. An engineering consultancy is based on the first floor and the second floor contains four large apartments.
