= Snedinge =

Manor house in Slagelse, Denmark

Sindinge
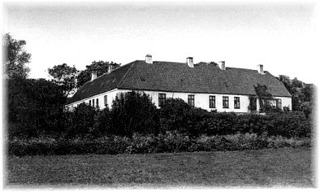
- Interactive map of the Sindinge area

General information
- Location: Ørslevvej 230; 4230 Skælskør, Denmark
- Coordinates: 55°13′30″N 11°25′35″E
- Completed: 1900s (main building); 1567-1663 (farm buildings)

Snedinge is a former manor house and estate located in Slagelse Municipality, Denmark. It has been a farm under Holsteinsborg since 1708. A three-winged complex of farm buildings from circa 1567-1663 have been listed on the Danish registry of protected buildings and places. The main building is from the 1900s but the cellar and foundations date from 1615. It is not listed. Museet for Landbokultur & -Erhverv, a small museum dedicated to the history of agriculture, fishing and crafts in the area, is located in one of the former cow stables (west wing).

== History ==
=== Early history ===
In the Middle Ages, Snedinge was the name of a village. Snedinge Manor was established in around 1370 from land that previously belonged to the other farms in the village. Both the manor and the village belonged to Roskilde Bishopric. Snedinge was generally managed as part of Vråde Fief but sometimes as is its own fief.

=== Daa and Grubbe families ===
Søren Daa served as the bishop's lensmand.His widow Karen Hrubbe kept the fief after his death. After the Eeformation, Snedinge was confiscated by the Crown together with all other property of the Catholic church. Shortly thereafter, Snedinge was acquired by their son Erik Daa as his property. Through his marriage he had also acquired Vollerup.

After Erik Daa's death, just a few years later, in 1539, Snedinge was passed to his son Jørgen daa (doed 1598). Vollerup was initially passed to two younger siblings, Torben and Karen Daa, but was later also acquired by Jørgen Daa. Je later ceded Vollerup to Frederick II in exchange for property in Scania. Jørgen Daa was married to Kirsten Jockumsdatter Beck.

After Jørgen Daa's death Snedinge was passed to his son Herluf Trolle Daa, He dissolved the remaining six farms in the village and incorporated the land directly under the manor. He was married to Hilleborg Poulsdatter Skinkel. He died at Snedinge in 1630. Snedinge was then passed to his relative Alexander Rabe von Papenheim. He died just one year later. His widow Regitze Grubbe kept the estate until her death,

=== Trolle family ===
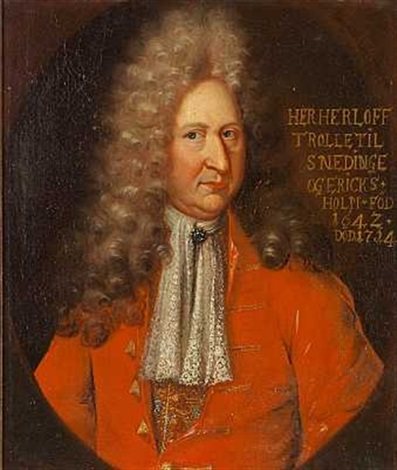
Herluf Nielsen Trolle

Her heirs sold Snedinge to Niels Trolle til Trollholm (new name of Bråde). Herluff Trolle succeeded his father as the owner of Trollholm and Snedinge in 1667.

=== Holstein family ===
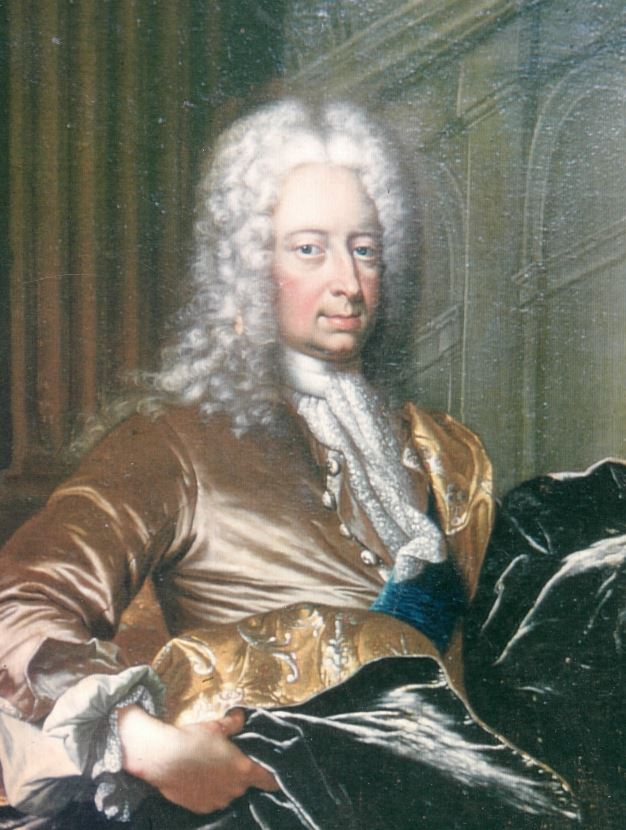
Ulrik Adolf Holstein.

In 1707, he sold it to his brother, Ulrik Adolph Holstein. In 1708, he established the Countship of Holsteinsborg from Snedinge and the farms Fyrendal and Trolholm.

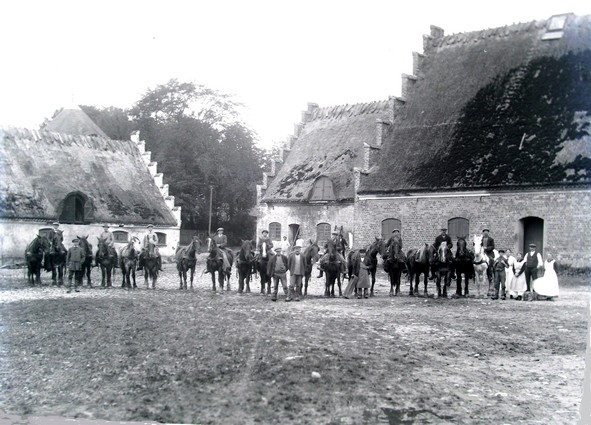
Snedinge, c. 1919

The Countship of Holsteinsborg existed until it was dissolved as a result of the lensafløsningen (abolition of legal titles and entailment of property) of 1921.

== Architecture ==
The two-winged main building is built in red brick. The walls are partly dressed.

The three-winged complex of farm buildings is built in red brick with grow-stepped gables. Gates, door and windows are generally painted red. Some of the windows have round-arched iron frames. The roofs were originally thatched but are now clad with metal plating. Kostalden og laden med de to smallere sidebygninger (1663) samt den lange østlænge (antagelig 1567 og ca. 1660). Fredet 1918. Udvidet 1964.

The north wing is a barn from 1773. Two slightly lower and narrower extensions project from each end of the gables. There is a large gate in the middle of the south wing of the courtyard. The walls feature a series of wall anchors; those in the west gable are shaped as the year "1663". A second gate is located in the western gable. The east wing is from 1567 and partly attached to the north wing. It was built as combined horse stables, carriage house and granary loft. The courtyard (west) side of the building is red-washed while the other sides stand in undressed brick. It now contains a small residence at each gable. The free-standing west wing was built as cow stables. The building is from 1663 but the short side wings that project from the west side of the building are newer extensions.

The three-winged complex of farm buildings have been listed on the Danish registry of protected buildings and places in 1918 and 1964.

== Today ==
Snedinge is today owned by Ulrich Holstein-Holsteinborg and operated as a farm under Holsteinsborg.

== List of owners ==
- (1370) Bishops of Roskilde
- (1400) Jacobus Martini de Snøtinge
- (1460) Olaf Grubbe
- (1481) Jens Mikkelsen
- (1500) Niels Grubbe
- (1511- ) Karen Daa, née Grubbe
- ( -1538) Erik Daa
- (1538-1597) Jørgen Daa
- (1597- ) Herluf Trolle Daa
- ( -1631) Alexander Rabe von Papenheim
- (1631-1650) Regitze Papenheim, née Grubbe
- (1650-1656) Heirs of Regitze Grubbe
- (1656-1667) Niels Trolle
- (1667-1707) Herluf Trolle
- (1707-1737) Ulrich Adolph Holstein-Holsteinborg
- (1737-1749) Frederik Conrad Holstein-Holsteinborg
- (1749-1759) Christoph Conrad Holstein-Holsteinborg
- (1759-1760) Cay Joachim Detlev Holstein-Holsteinborg
- (1760-1796) Heinrich Holstein-Holsteinborg
- (1796-1836) Frederik Adolph Holstein-Holsteinborg
- (1836-1892) Ludvig Henrik Carl Herman Holstein-Holsteinborg
- (1892-1922) Frederik Conrad Christian Christoffer, born (?) Holstein-Holsteinborg
- (1922-1960) Erik Frederik Adolph Joachim Holstein-Holsteinborg
- (1960- ) Ib Holstein-Holsteinborg
- (1981- ) Ulrich Holstein-Holsteinborg
