= Store Frederikslund =

Manor house near Slagelse, Denmark

- Interactive map of the Store Frederikslund area

General information
- Architectural style: Neoclassical
- Location: Slagelse Municipality, Store Frederikslund 8; 4200 Slagelse, Denmark
- Coordinates: 55°26′32″N 11°27′46″E
- Completed: 1780s
- Client: Hans Henrik von Eickstedt

Design and construction
- Architect: Andreas Kirkerup

Store Frederikslund is a manor house and estate located eight kilometres northeast of Slagelse, Slagelse Municipality, Denmark. It is one of several estates that was established when Antvorskov Cavalry District was sold in public auction. It was established by General Hans Henrik von Eickstedt in 1783 and later owned by the Castenschiold/Grevenkop-Castenschiolds family from 1786 to 1995. The Neoclassical main building from the 1780s was probably designed by Andreas Kirkerup. It was listed on the Danish registry of protected buildings and places in 1918.

== History ==
=== Origins ===
In 1568, Sorø Abbey sold the farm Landbytorp and the village of Davidsrød to Jens Hiort. In 1586, Landbytorp and Davidsrø were both incorporated in the fief of Antvorskov. In 1673, Landbytorp was disjoined from the fief as a large farm owned by Povl Nielsen. His widow stayed on the farm after her husband's death but in 1691 sold it to Bertel Pedersen. In 1719, Landbytorp was again acquired by the crown and incorporated in the new Antvorskov Cavalry District.

=== Hans Henrik von Eickstedt ===
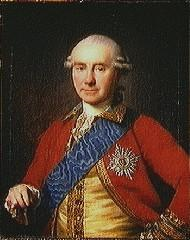
Hans Henrik von Eickstedt

Antvorskov Cavalry District existed until 1774. The land was then divided into estates and sold in public auction. Landbytorp was acquired by Hans Larsen Fogh and Davidsrød went to Christian Sveistrup. In 1783, Landbytorp and Davidsrød were both acquired by Hans Henrik von Eickstedt who, in 1772, had been involved in the revolt against Johann Friedrich Struensee. He merged the land into a single manor under the name Store Frederikslund. The name was a tribute to Crown Prince Frederick, the later Frederick VI. Von Eickstedt constructed a main building on his estate as well as a farm which was given the name Lille Frederikslund.

After the coup d'état in 1884, in which Crown Prince Frederick forced Ove Høegh-Guldberg to resign, von Eickstedt was also dismissed from all his offices. In compensation, he was granted the title chamberlain as well as a considerable pension.

=== 1786-1995: Grevencop/-Castenschiold ===
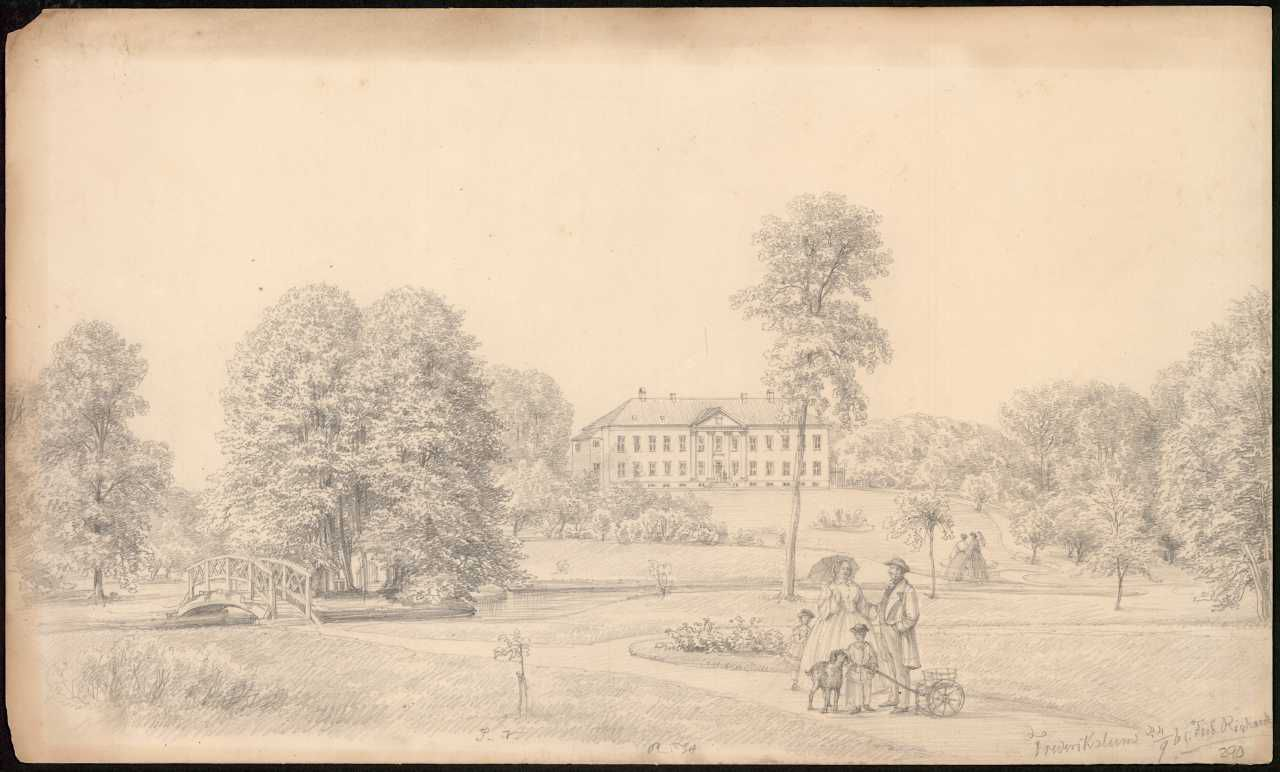
Store Frederikslund by Ferdinand Richardt, 1861

In 1786, he sold Store Frederikslund to Jørgen Frederik Castenskiold. He was the second-eldest son of Johan Lorentz Castenschiold and the brother of Carl Adolph Castenschiold (1740–1820) and Joachim Castenschiold (1743–1817). He was already the owner of two other estates, Hørbygaard at Holbæk and Valbygård at Slagelse, but sold Valbygaard to Poul Christian von Stemann in 1805. He was married to Johanne Vilhelmine Grevencop and the couple had 13 children, many of whom died at an early age.

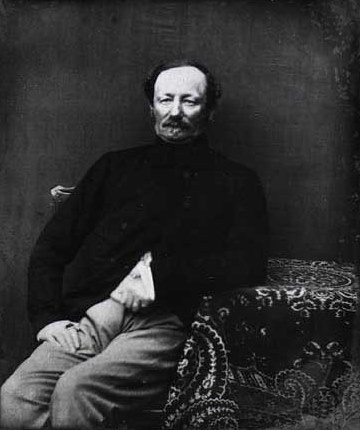
Jørgen Grevenkop-Castenskiold

Jørgen Frederik Castenschiold died at Store Frederikslund in 1819. He had in 1813 ceded the ownership of Store Frederikslund and Hørbygaard to his eldest surviving son, Caspar Holten Castenschiold, who on 5 May 1826, was granted royal permission to assume the name Grevencop-Castenschiold. Caspar Holten Castenschiold had in 1825 become the owner of his third estate when he purchased Hagestedgaard from a cousin.

Caspar Holten Grevencop-Castenschiold's estates were after his death divided between his three surviving sons. Store Frederikslund passed to his eldest son, Jørgen Frederik Grevenkop-Castenbskiold, who owned it until 1874. He converted most of the copyholds to freeholds. He also improved the management of the estate and refurbished the home farm.

In 1929, Jørgen Adolph Grevenkop-Castenskiold sold Lille Frederikslund to Viggo de Neergaard. In 1935, he ceded Store Frederikslund to his son Erik Wilhelm Grevenkop-Castenskiold.

=== 1995-preseent: Later history ===
In 1995, Store Frederikslund was sold to founder of IC Group Klaus Helmersen. In 2012, he sold the estate for around DKK 200 million.

== Architecture ==
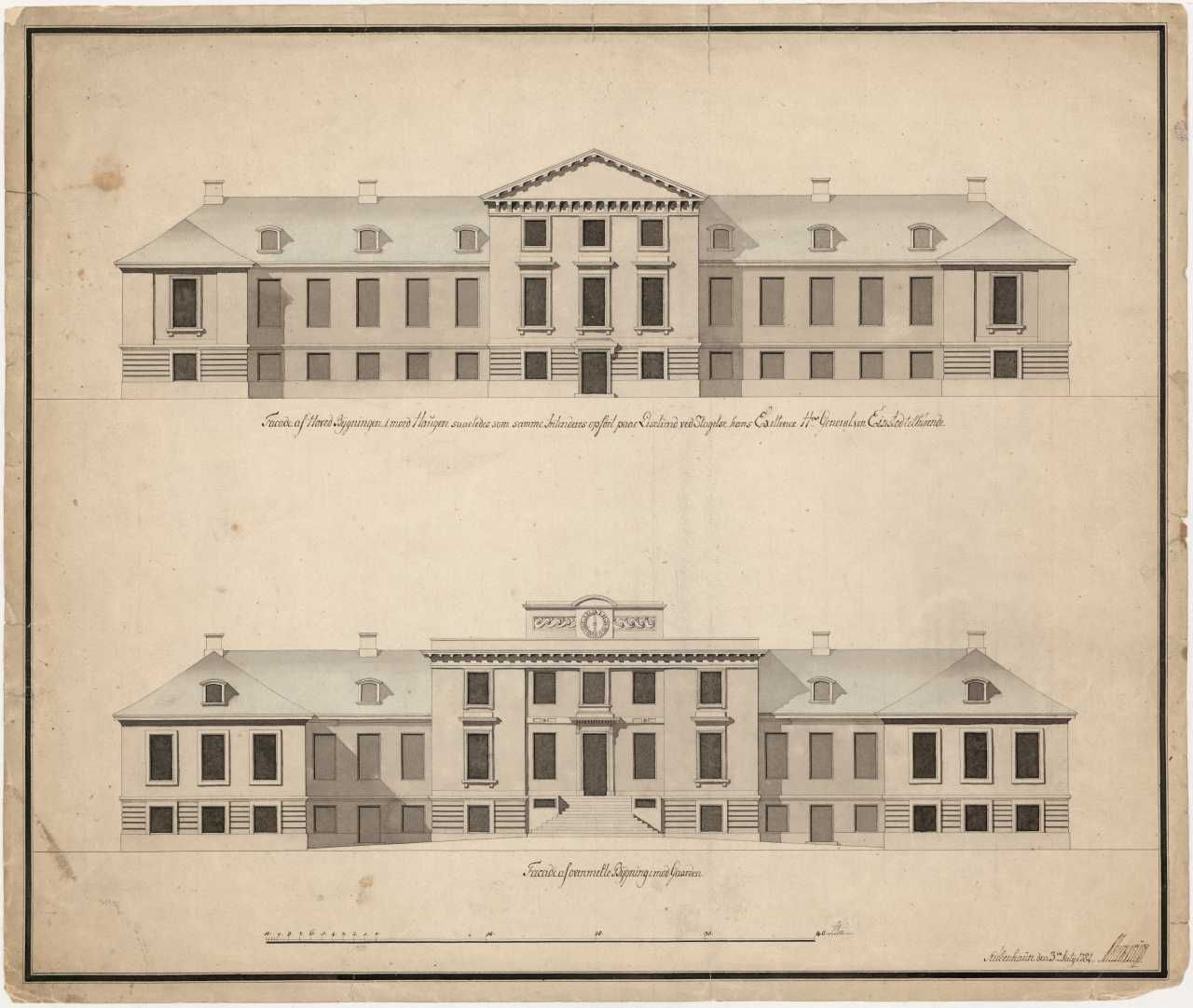
A rendering by Andreas Kirkerup from 1783

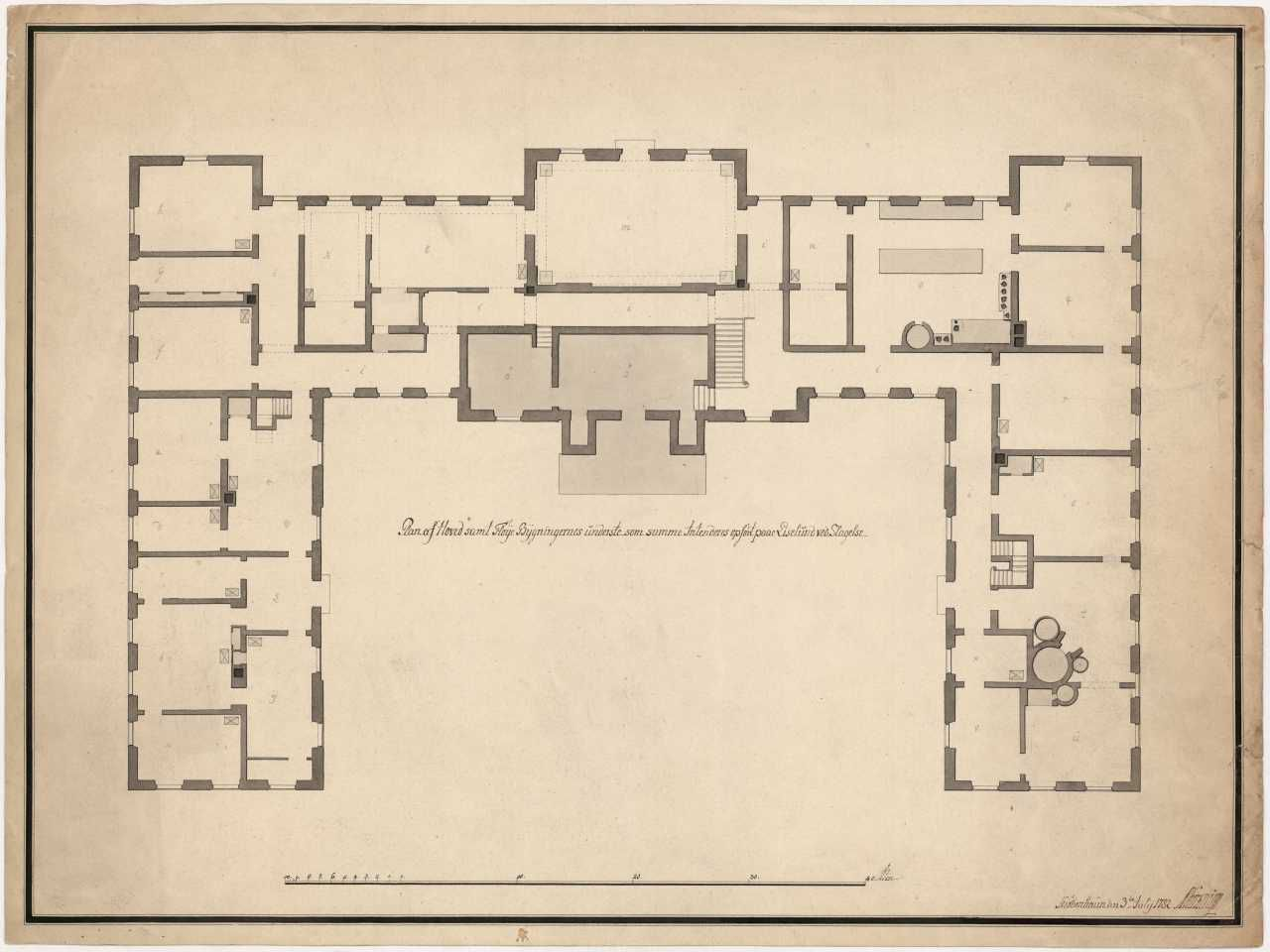
Plan drawing, 1783

The Neoclassical main building dates from the 1780s and was probably designed by Andreas Kirkerup. It is part of a large, rectangular complex surrounding a central courtyard. The two side wings have median risalits on both sides. The median risalits towards the garden feature four Tuscan order pilasters and are topped by triangular pediments. The main building was listed on the Danish registry of protected buildings and places in 1918.

== Today ==
The current owner, St. Frederikslund A/S, is again owned by Bermuda-based TK Foundation, a not for profit foundation and major shareholder of Teekay which was founded when the company's founder, Danish-American Torben Karlshøj, died. The foundation is in Denmark also operating under the name Kattegatfonden (Kattegat Foundation).

The estate covers approximately 500 hectares of land. The main building is used by the TK Foundation as a conference centre.

== List of owners ==
- (1783-1786) Hans Henrik von Eickstedt
- (1786-1813) Jørgen Frederik Castenschiold
- (1813-1854) Caspar Holten Grevencop-Castenschiold
- (1856-1874) Jørgen Frederik Johannes Grevenkop-Castenskiold
- (1874-1913) Hans Schack Helmuth Grevenkop-Castenskiold
- (1913-1935) Jørgen Adolph Grevenkop-Castenskiold
- (1935-1995) Erik Wilhelm Grevenkop-Castenskiold
- (1995-2012) Klaus Helmersen
- (2012- ) St. Frederikslund A/S
