= Brænderigården, Slagelse =

Listed building in Slagelse, Denmark

Brænderigården
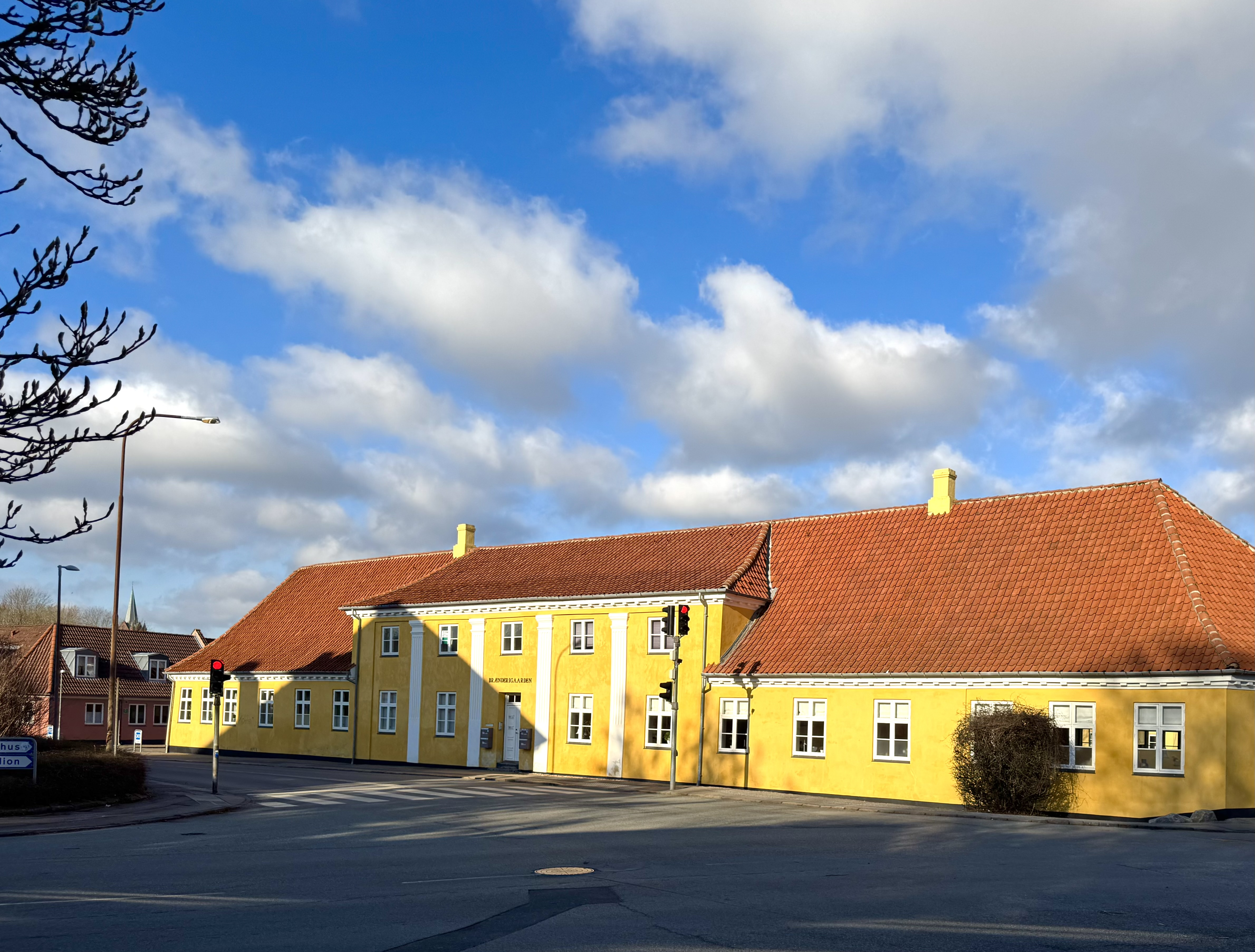
- Interactive map of the Brænderigården area

General information
- Location: Slagelse, Slotsgade 53, 4200 Slagelse, Denmark
- Coordinates: 55°23′56.83″N 11°21′32.62″E
- Completed: 1807

Brænderigården (lit. "The Distillery House") is a historic building in Slagelse, Denmark. The building was constructed by the industrious miller and businessman Hans Abelin Schou in 1807. As indicated by the name, he operated a distillery on the site. The distillery was continued by later owners for around one hundred years. In 1911, part of the attached land was used for an extension of Slagelse Lystanlæg. The building was listed on the Danish registry of protected buildings and places in 1918. In 1973, it was acquired by the Ministry of Justice and used as courthouse. In 2012, it was converted into apartments by a private investor.

== History ==
=== Hans Abelin Schou ===
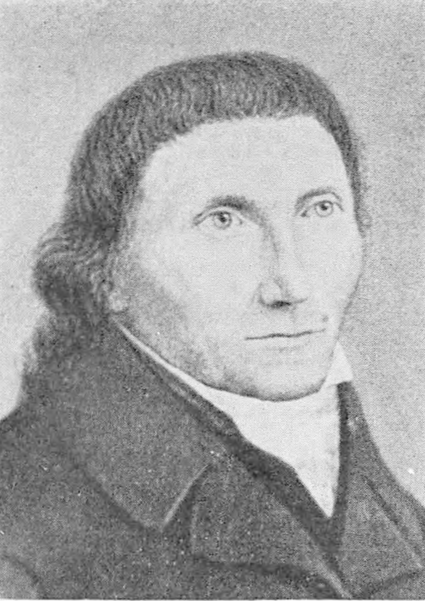
Hans Abelin Schou.

Antvorskov Manor was acquired in 1799 by Constantin Brun. In c. 1800, he established a long tree-lined driveway (now Slotsalléen) from Antvorskov Manor to the southern end of Slotsgade. In connection with the creation of the avenue, he bought a number of properties at the southern end of Slotsgade. In 1807, one year after parting with Antvorskov Manor, He sold one of these properties to Hans Abelin Schou. Bruun had demolished the farmhouse before selling the property. The present building on the site was completed by Schou in July 1807.

Hans Abelin Schou had just moved to Slagelse after buying Bjergbygade Windmill. He had experience as a miller, having previously leased Ravnemøllen at Præstø. He established a distillery in his new house. Farmland and meadows, situated in St. Peter's Rural Parish (Sct. Peders Landsogn), were also part of the estate. In 1811, he sold Brænderigården and constructed a new house on Nytorv. At this point, he gave up the distillery trade in favour of a career as a wholesaler. In 1826, he ceded the wholesale business to his eldest son Hans Henrik Schou. The venture developed into the largest grain wholesale business on Zealand. His other son, Frederik Ludvig Schou, was the father of painter Johan Abelin Schou.

=== Later history ===
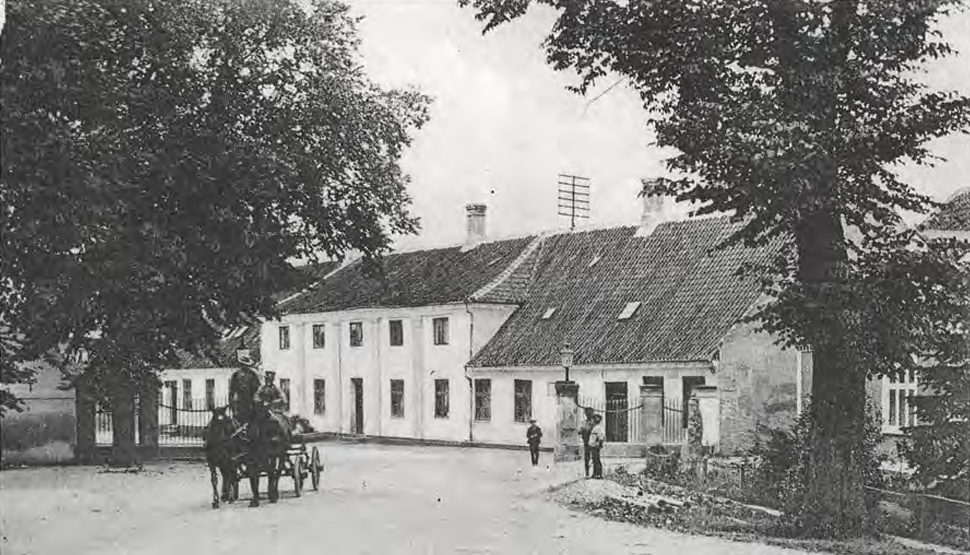
Brænderigården in the beginning of the 20th century.

The distillery was continued by later owners for the next approximately one hundred years.

In 1907, Slagelse Municipality acquired most of the attached land. In 1911, part of the land (35 hectares or 86 acres) were laid out as training grounds for the new Antvorskov Barracks at Kastanievej. Another portion of land was ceded to Slagelse Forskønnelsesforening (founded 1876) for inclusion in Slagelse Lystanlæg.

The Brænderigården was used for residential purpopuses. In 1954, it was also bought by Slagelse Municipality. Three years later it was deemed unsuitable for residential use. In 1870, it was sold to Slagelse Omegns Historiske Kreds and comprehensive restoration work. In 1973, it was acquired by the Ministry of Justice for use as courthouse.

== Architecture ==
Brænderigården is a 17-bay long, single-storey building. It has a somewhat irregular shape, with an obtuse-angled southern corner and an acute-angled, chamfered northwestern corner, reflecting the alignment of the surrounding roads. The building is constructed in brick from the demolishion of Antvorskov Castle. It stands on a black-painted plinth. The yellow-plastered facade features a five-bay-long, two-storey median risalit, accented by four fluted giant order pilasters. The facade is finished by a white-painted dentillated cornice. The hip roof is clad in red tile. The roof ridge is pierced by two chimneys.
