= Tårnholm =

Manor house at Korsør, Denmark

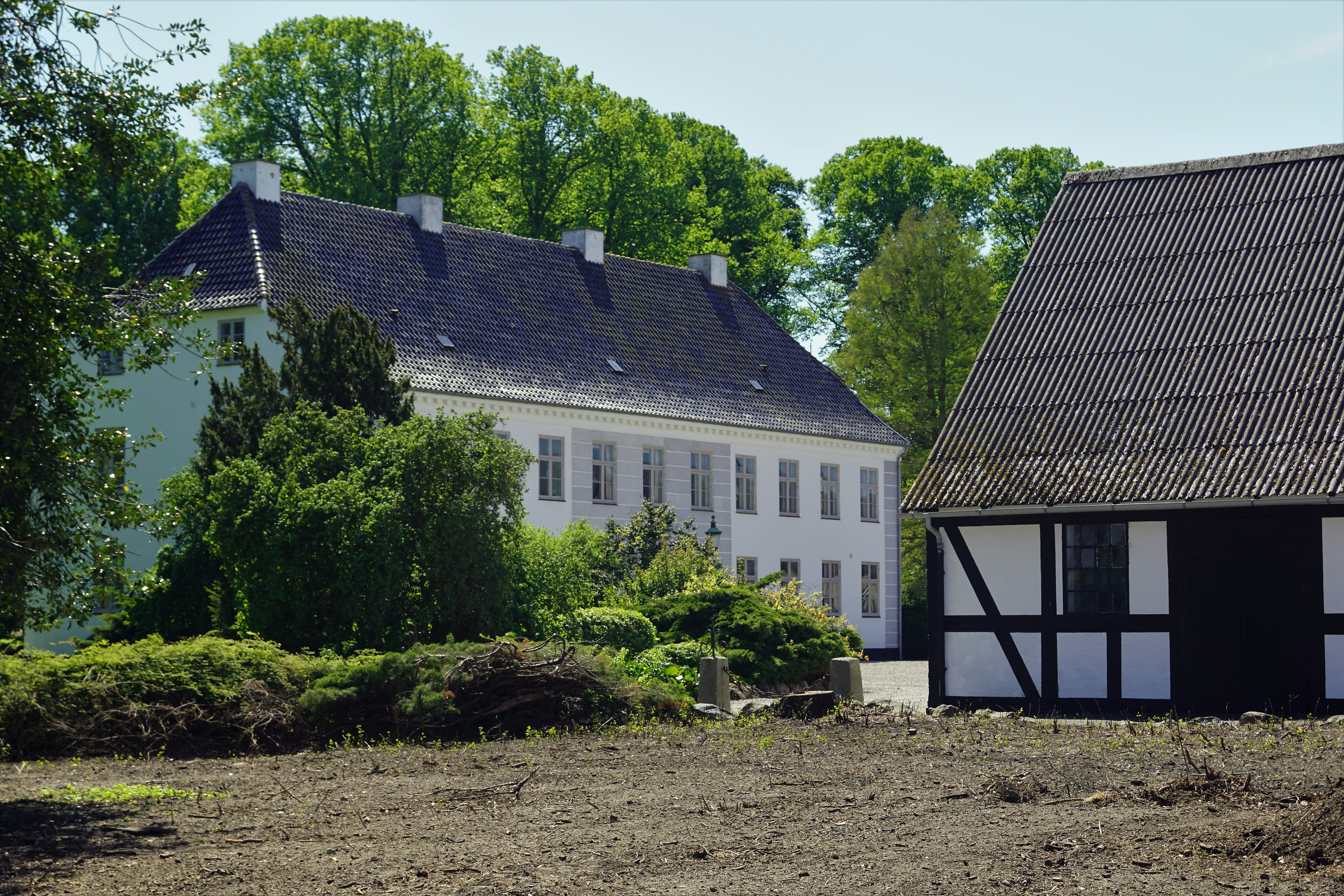
- Interactive map of the Tårnholm area

General information
- Architectural style: Neoclassical
- Location: Jirsør, Slagelse Municipality, Marsk Stigs Vej 150; 4220 Korsør, Denmark
- Coordinates: 55°20′35.63″N 11°12′51.01″E
- Completed: 1798

Tårnholm is a manor house and estate at Korsør, Slagelse Municipality, Denmark. The building was listed on the Danish registry of protected buildings and places in 1949.

== History ==
=== Early history ===
Tårnholm was created when the former Antvorskov Cavalry District was divided into nine estates and sold in auction by the crown in 1774. The largest of the estates, Tårnborg, was acquired by Christian Eggers for 26,000 Danish rigsdaler and renamed it Tårnholm. Eggers was also the owner of e Dyrehovedgaard. Christian Egger's son Niels Christian Eggers inherited Taarnholm after his father's death in 1796.

In 1793, Tårnholm was acquired by Peter Jensen Giersing for 62,500 rigsdaler. He was also the owner of Nordruplund. He constructed a three-winged manor house on the estate in 1798.

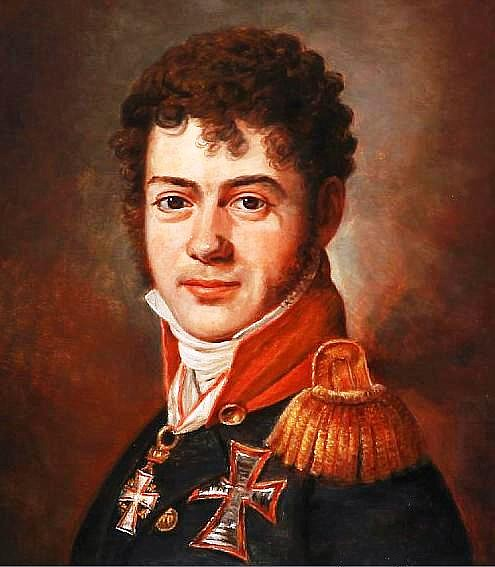
Jørgen Conrad de Falsen

Peter Jensen Giersing improved the quality of the soil. In 1805, he was able to sell the land for 245,000 rigsdaler. The buyer was a consortium that consisted of count Vilhelm Carl Ferdinand Ahlefeldt-Laurvigen, Salomon Lindegaard and Rasmus Møller. The end of the Napoleonic Wars and the Danish State Bankruptcy of 1913 was followed by a long agricultural crisis. In 1819, Vilhelm Carl Ferdinand Ahlefeldt-Laurvigen became the sole owner of the estate in 1819. In 1824, he went bankrupt and the estate was then taken over by the state. In 1835, Tårnholm was sold to a company. The buyer was the Bank of Denmark. In 1835, it was sold to Jørgen Conrad de Falsen. He had served as a naval officer during the Napoleonic Wars and later spent several years in Switzerland and France. Successful investments had enabled him to buy both Tårnholm and Søbysøgaard.

=== Oxholm family, 1845–1925 ===
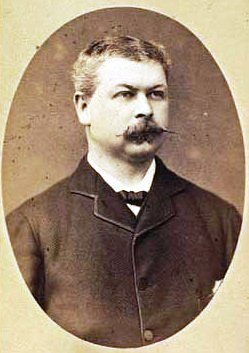
Alexander Georg Tully Oxholm

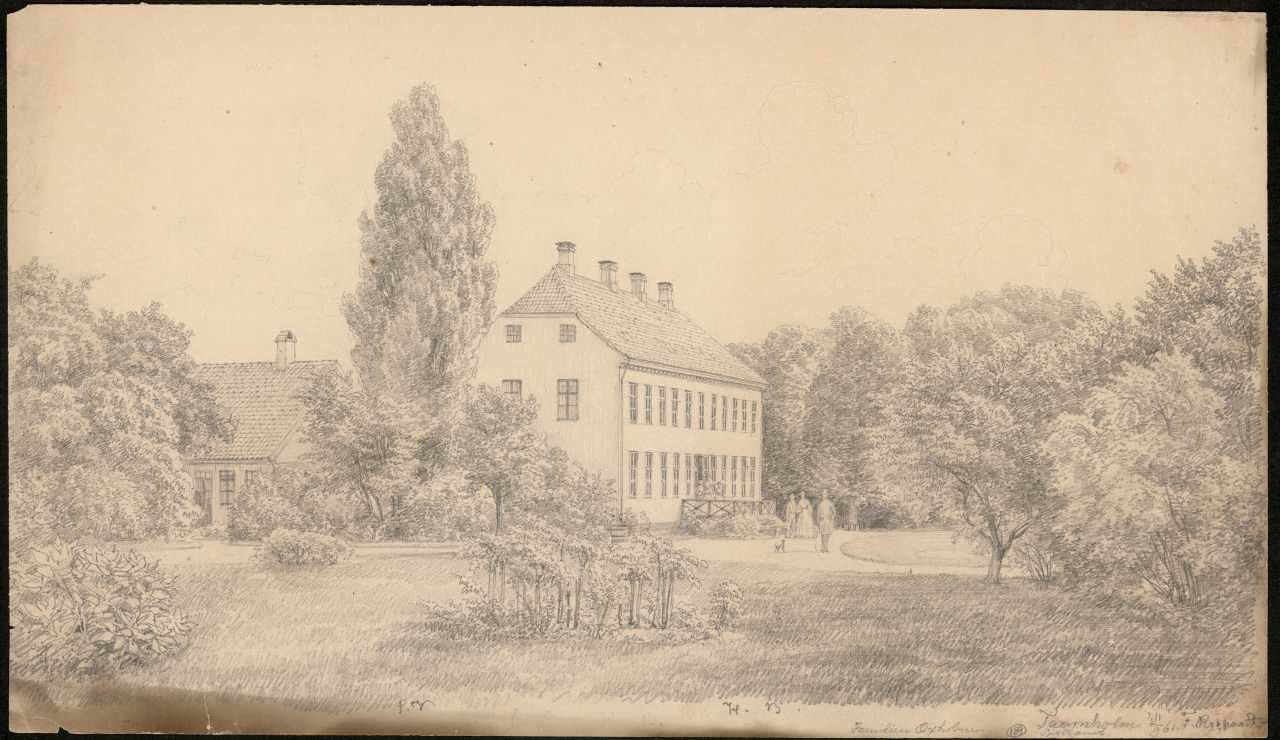
Tårnholm by Ferdinand Richardt, 1861

In 1845, he sold Tårnholm to Harald Peter Oxholm, a son of former Danish governor of the Danish West Indies, Peter Lotharius Oxholm, and Anne O'Neill. One of his elder brothers, Waldemar Tully Oxholm, was the owner of Tårnborg. In the 1850s, Oxholm began to convert the estate's copyholdings into freeholds. He owned Tårnholm for almost forty years. After his death in 1908, Tårnholm passed to his son Alexander Georg Tully Oxholm. After his death in 1908, it went to his son Harald Peter Jørgen Valdemar Oxholm.

=== Later owners, 1925–present ===
In 1923, Harald Peter Jørgen Valdemar Oxholm sold Tårnholm to merchant Carl Drost, who just a few months later sold it to Carl August Bang. In 1934, he sold Tårnholm to the company A/S Taarnholm.

== Architecture ==
The Neoclassical main building is from 1798. The two-storey building is nine bays wide. On each side of the building is a median risalit with four pilasters tipped by a triangular pediment. The roof is a half-hipped black-glazed tile roof with four chimneys. The building was originally the central wing in a three-winged complex but the two detached side wings have been removed.

To the north of the main wing is a three-winged complex of half-timbered farm buildings of which two of the wings date from 1798. To the west of these buildings are some younger farm buildings of which some date from the second half of the 19th century and some are modern.

== Today ==
Tårnholm was in 1997 acquired by Knud Hjorth Rasmussen.

== List of owners ==
- (1774–1793) Christian Eggers
- (1793–1796) Niels Christian Eggers
- (1796–1805) Peter Jensen Giersing
- (1805–1819) Salomon Lindegaard
- (1805–1819) Rasmus Møller
- (1805–1824) Vilhelm Carl Ferdinand Ahlefeldt-Laurvigen
- (1824–1835) Direktionen for Statsgælden og den synkende Fond
- (1835–1836) Nationalbanken
- (1836–1845) Jørgen Conrad de Falsen
- (1845–1869) Harald Peter Oxholm
- (1869–1908) Alexander Georg Tully Oxholm
- (1908–1923) Harald Peter Jørgen Valdemar Oxholm
- (1923) Carl Drost
- (1923–1934) Carl August Bang
- (1934– ) A/S Tårnholm
- (1997– ) Knud Hjorth Rasmussen
