= Bishop's House, Nykøbing Falster =

Official residence of the bishop

Coordinates: 54°45′45″N 11°52′41″E

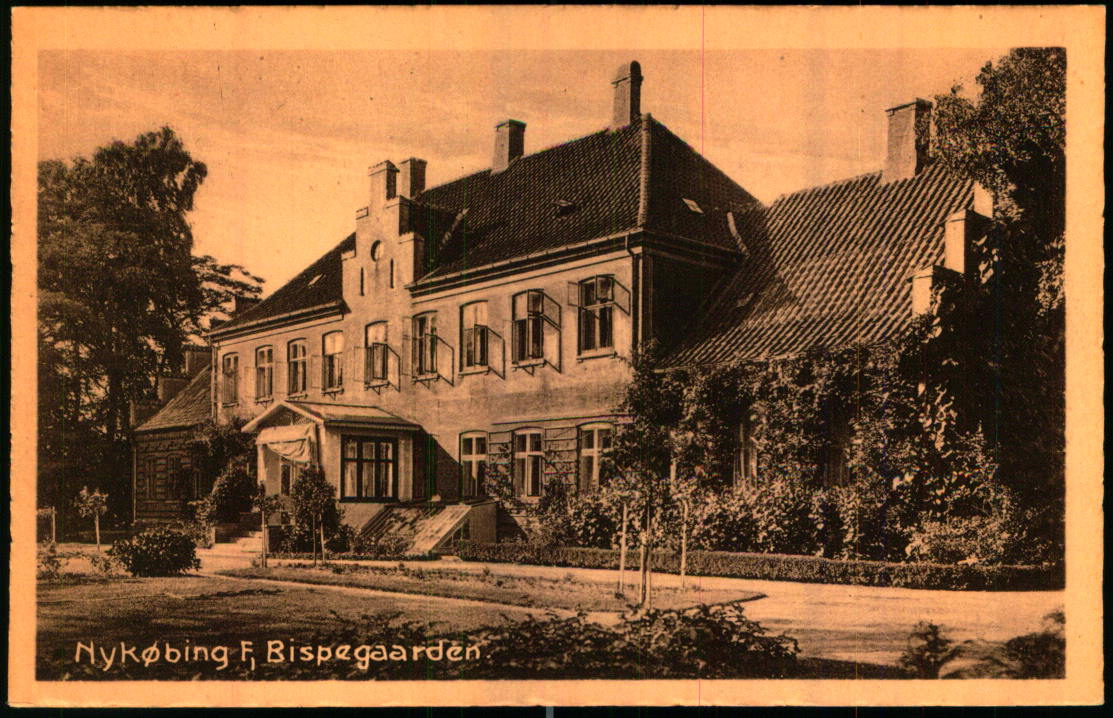
The building viewed from the garden

The Bishop's House (Danish: Bispegården) in Nykøbing Falster is the official residence of the bishop of Lolland-Falster. The main building was constructed in 1850 to designs by Gottlieb Bindesbøll. Its nine central bays were heightened in 1895. Bindesbøll's building is now flanked by two secondary wings, an outbuilding from 1785 and an office building from 1995. Bindesbøll's building from 1750 and the outbuilding from 1895 were both listed in the Danish registry of protected buildings and places in 1977. It is located in a large garden at the corner of Østre Allé and Østerbrogade, close to Nykøbing Falster Sugar Factory.

== History ==
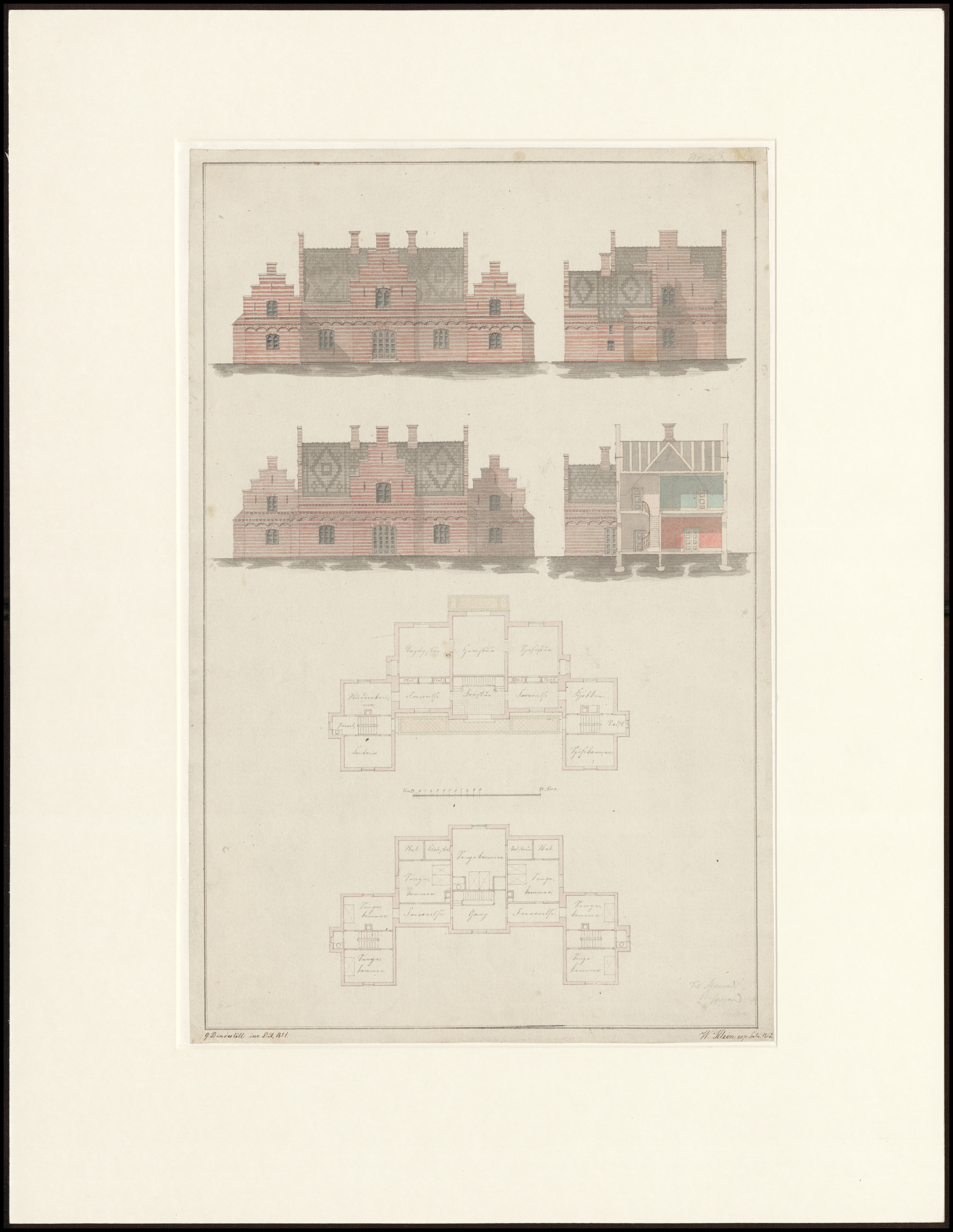
One of Bindesbøll's renderings

The Bishop's House in Nyjøbing was constructed by Gottlieb Bindesbøll in 1850 at the initiative of Ditlev Gothard Monrad. It was a 15-bays single-storey building with crow-stepped gables. The central bay of the facade that faced the garden was also tipped by a crow-stepped gable. The western end of the building contained his office and other representative functions.

The building was expanded by H.C. Glahn in 1895. He heightened the nine-bay central part of the building with one storey. He also added a new east wing, which was connected to the main wing by an arcade.

In 1993, Karsten Rønnow was charged with expanding the complex with a new office building. It was constructed as a new west wing, complementing Glahn's east wing from 1895. In 2010, it was extended with a modern building.

== Architecture ==
The roof was clad in red tile. The eastern end of the building contained the bishop's private residence. The nine central bays are now topped by a hip roof.

Some of the rooms have frescos created by Georg Hilker and Constantin Hansen.

== Garden ==
The 10,000-square-metre garden is partly surrounded by a yellow-washed wall. One of the largest trees in the garden is a Platanus tree plated by Monrad. The garden contains memorial stones for all the bishops who have resided in the building. Another feature is a mound with a central chamber surrounded by boulders. It was created for Monrad's children from the soil that was removed when the house was constructed. It contains a fireplace. The building was used for hiding weapons and Jewish refugees during World War II.
