= Gottlieb Bindesbøll =

Danish architect

Michael Gottlieb Bindesbøll
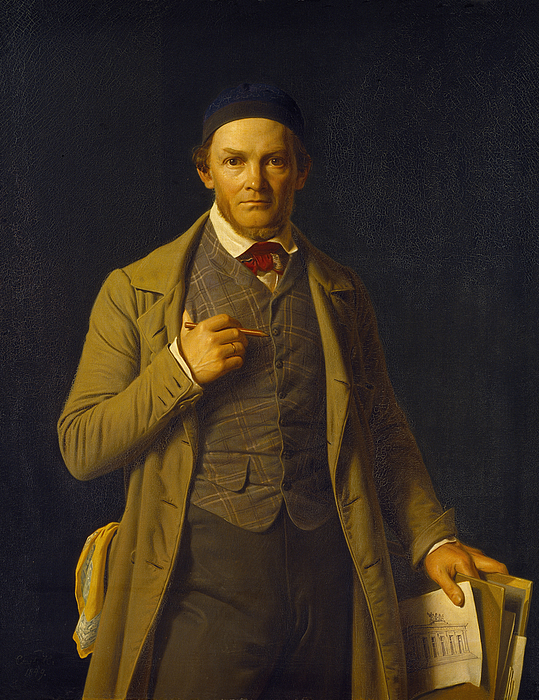
- Constantin Hansen, Portrait of Gottlieb Bindesbøll, 1840
- Born: 5 September 1800; Ledøje, Denmark
- Died: 14 July 1856 (aged 55); Frederiksberg, Denmark
- Education: Royal Danish Academy of Fine Arts
- Occupation: Architect
- Awards: C. F. Hansen Medal (1833)
- Buildings: Thorvaldsens Museum; Brumleby

Signature
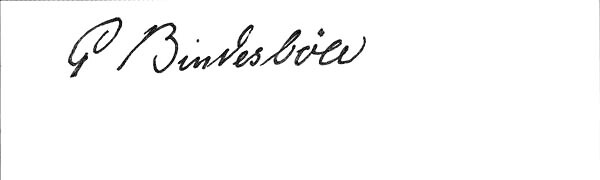

Michael Gottlieb Birckner Bindesbøll (5 September 1800 – 14 July 1856) was a Danish architect active during the Danish Golden Age in the first half of the 19th century. Most known for his design of Thorvaldsens Museum in Copenhagen, he was a key figure in the stylistic shift in Danish architecture from late classicism to Historicism. He was the father of the designer Thorvald Bindesbøll and the textile artist Johanne Bindesbøll.

== Early life and education ==
Gottlieb Bindesbøll was born in Ledøje, a village 20 km west of Copenhagen. He first trained as a windmill builder with the intention of becoming an engineer. Simultaneously, from 1817 to 1823, he was taking night classes at the Royal Danish Academy of Fine Arts to learn to draw.

He attended lectures by Hans Christian Ørsted, the natural scientist, who in 1822 invited him along on a journey to Germany and France. There Bindesbøll got acquainted with Karl Friedrich Schinkel's Classicism and the two men also visited Goethe in Weimar, and met German-born architect and archaeologist Frans Gau, who introduced Bindesbøll to his studies of polychromy in Classical architecture.

Back in Denmark, Bindesbøll starting working as a resident architect for royal building inspector Jørgen Hansen Koch. He also continued his studies at the Academy until 1833, when he won the Academy's large gold medal.

== To Rome and beyond ==
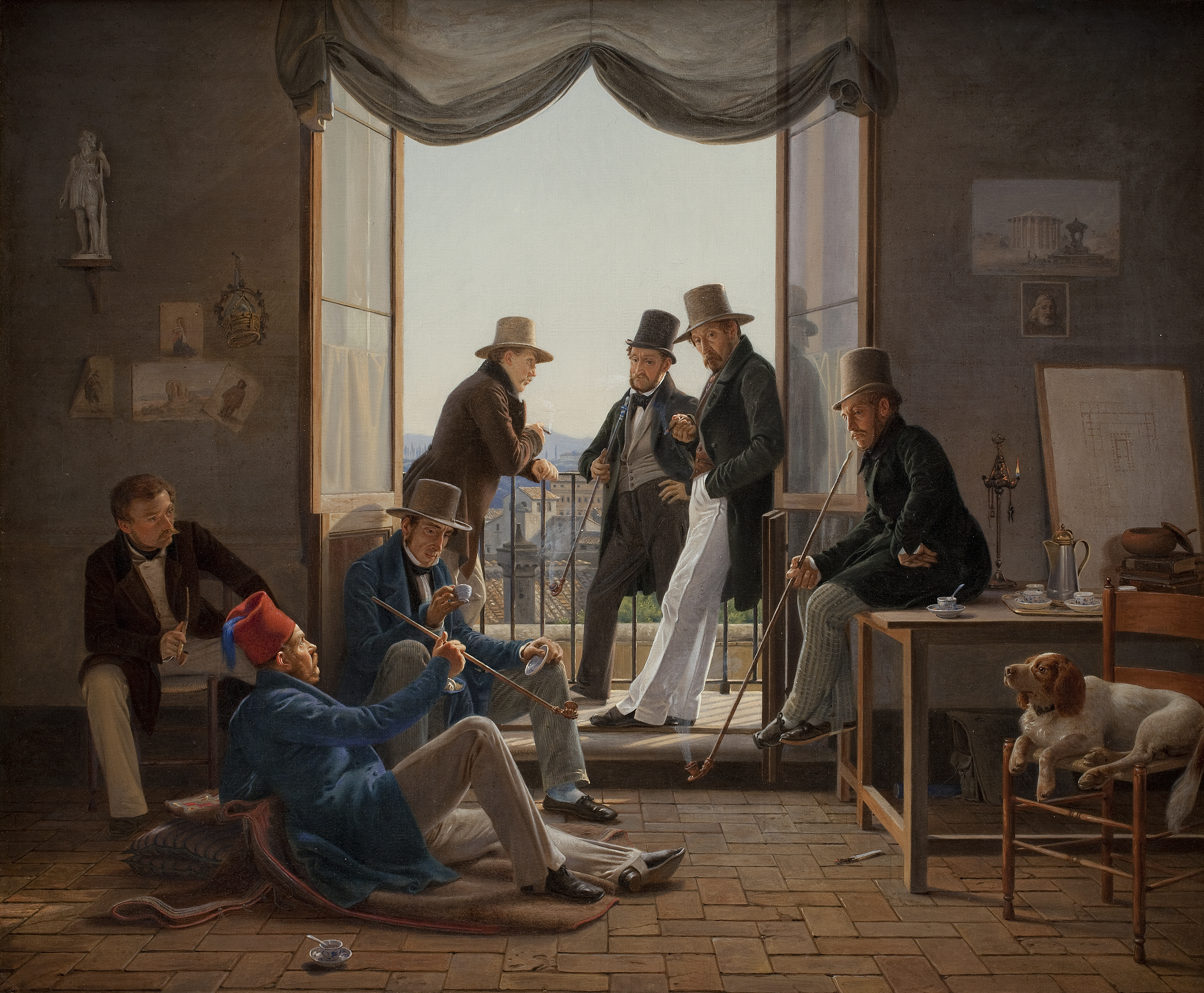
A company of Danish artists in Rome, painted by Constantin Hansen. Bindesbøll is lying on the floor with a fez he often wore after his visit to Constantinople together with Martinus Rørbye who is seen behind him as number two from the left. Also appearing in the picture are the painter himself, Marstrand, Küchler, Blunck and Jørgen Sonne

With the large gold medal came a travel scholarship and in 1834 Bindesbøll set out on a four-year journey to Rome, visiting Berlin, Dresden and Munich on the way. In Rome he joined the Danish artists' colony which, with Bertel Thorvaldsen as it central figure, resided in the city during those years. He also visited Southern Italy and, together with painter Martinus Rørbye, one of the compatriots he met in Rome, he continued to Greece the following year. In Athens he had the opportunity to study the polychromy of the Acropolis temples which Gau had first introduced him to more than a decade earlier. Bindesbøll and Rørbye also visited Constantinople in the Ottoman Empire before returning to Rome in 1836.

During his stay in Rome Bindesbøll collected a store of antique decorations. He was interested in simple, powerful geometric patterns such as floor mosaics.

== Thorvaldsens Museum ==
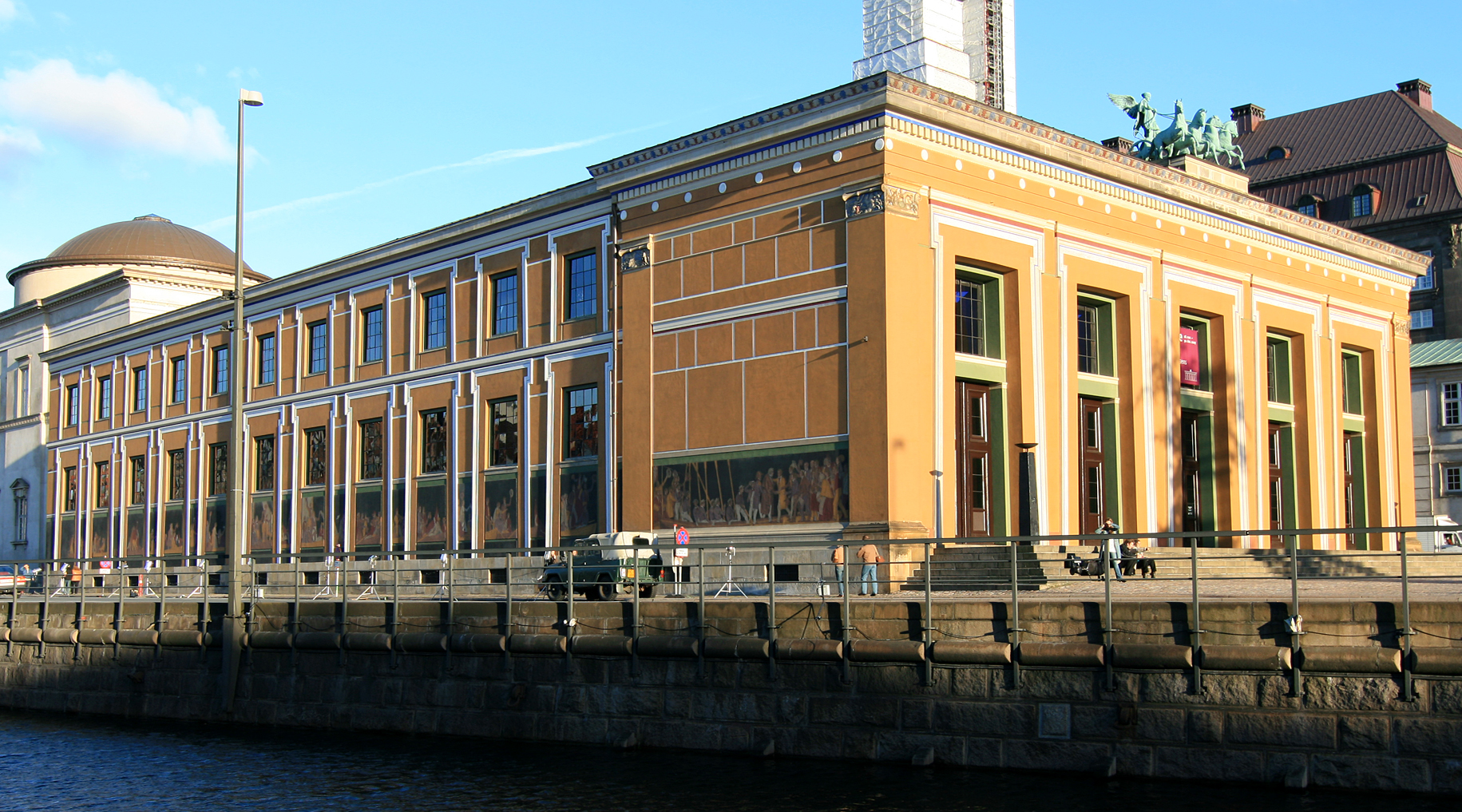
Thorvaldsens Museum on Slotsholmen in Copenhagen

In 1833, there was talk in Copenhagen of establishing a museum for the Danish sculptor, Bertel Thorvaldsen, if he would agree to bequeath his collections to his homeland. Jonas Collin, an active art and culture official under Frederik VI, awakened the King's interest in a museum for Thorvaldsen and asked Bindesbøll (Collin's nephew) to make some sketches for the building whose location had not yet been decided. Bindensbøll's designs ultimately stood out from other architects' competing for the commission to transform the Royal Carriage Depot and Theatre Scenery Painting Building into a museum dedicated to Thorvaldsen.

Bindesbøll liberated the building from its surroundings, just as Thorvaldsen had liberated sculpture from architecture. He emulated the construction of the Erechtheion and the Pantheon as freestanding buildings designed to be seen from a diagonal point of view, released from traditional urban plan of closed street courses. This new, free perception of space served as a guiding principle for the cities and buildings of the future (Lange, Bente, and Jens Lindhe. Thorvaldsen's Museum: Architecture, Colours, Light. Copenhagen: Danish Architectural Press, 2002)

== Late career ==
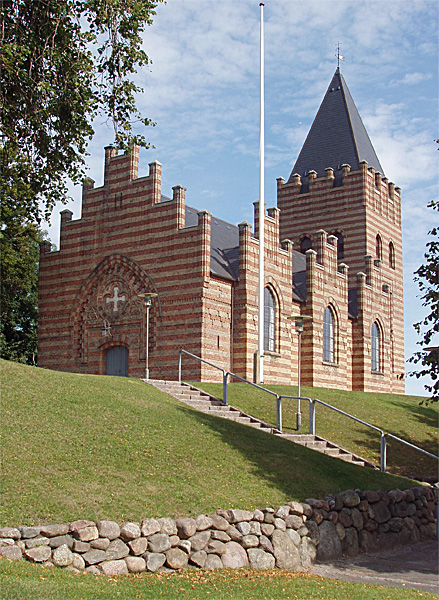
Hobro Church, 1852

In 1847, Bindesbøll was appointed Royal Building Inspector in Holstein and from 1849 in Jutland.

In 1851, he returned to the Danish capital when he was appointed Royal Building Inspector in Copenhagen. For the Royal Danish Society of Medicine he designed an area of terraced houses later known as Brumleby, which was to provide good, healthy housing for the lower classes, and set a standard for later, similar developments. His last major project in Copenhagen was the Royal Veterinary and Agricultural University's main building in Frederiksberg, which was built from 1856 to 1858.

He was made a titular professor in 1853 and a professor at the Art Academy in Copenhagen in 1856 but died shortly after, on 14 July 1856.

== Selected projects ==
- Thorvaldsens Museum, Copenhagen (1839–48)
- Yellow and Red Cottage, Klampenborg Spa, Klampenborg, Denmark (1844, listed in 1978 and 1979, other works at the same site demolished)
- Rosendal Manor, Faxe, Denmark (1847–49, listed in 1950)
- Upåkra Church, Scania, Sweden (1848–49)
- Jyske Asyl, Aarhus (1850)
- Bishop's House, Nykøbing Falster, Falster, Denmark (1850, listed in 1977)
- Hobro Church, Hobro, Denmark (1850–52)
- Rørvig Church (tower), Rørvig, Denmark (1852–53)
- Town Hall, Court House and Jail, Thisted, Denmark (1853, listed in 1978)
- Schleswig Railway stations, Schleswig (most have been demolished)
- Flensborg Central Station (demolished in 1983)
- Old Town Hall, Storegade 39, Stege, Møn, Denmark (1853–54, listed in 1971)
- Brumleby, Copenhagen (first blocks and the inspector's residence 1853–57, from 1867 expanded by Vilhelm Klein, fredet, listed)
- Hother Hage House, Møn, Denmark (1854)
- Doctor's House, Skælskør (1856)
- Vrams Gunnarstorp Castle (rebuilding), Scania, Sweden (1854–56)
- Brock House, Taarbæk Strandvej, Taarbæk (1855)
- Old Town Hall, Hjultorvet 2, Næstved, Denmark (1855–56, listed in 1959)
- Great Hall, University of Copenhagen, Copenhagen (1856)
- Oringe Psychiatric Hospital, Færgegårdsvej 15, Vordingborg (1857, listed in 1945)
- Frederik VII Memorial, Rytterknægten, Bornholm, Denmark (1856, height added by Thorvald Bindesbøll in 1899)
- The Royal Veterinary and Agricultural University's main building, Frederiksberg, Denmark (1856–58, main building and two lateral wings, later extended by J. E. Gnudtzmann, listed in 1950, forge demolished in 1977)

== See also ==
- Architecture of Denmark
