= Kongegården =

Listed building in Slagelse, Denmark

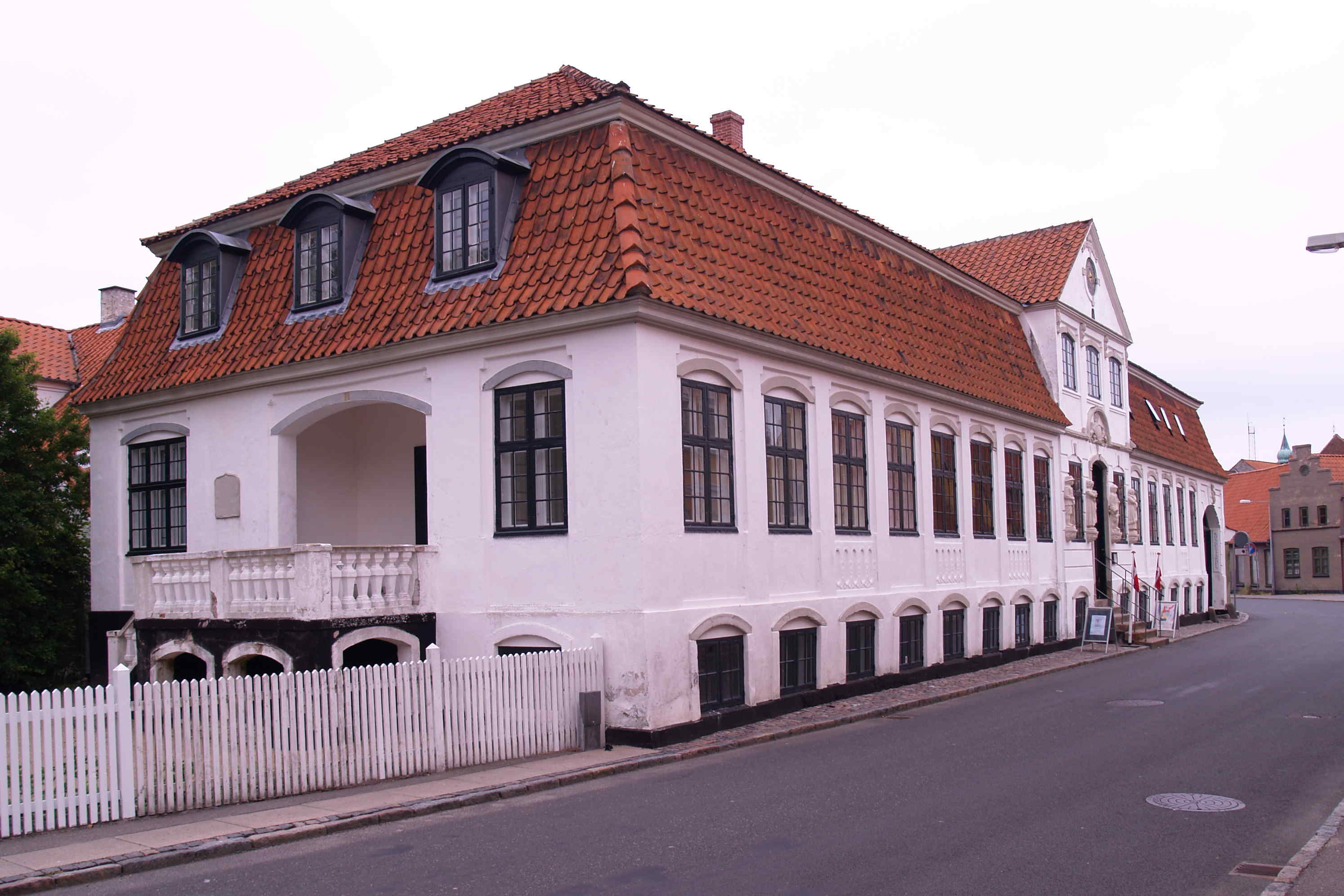
- Interactive map of the Kongegården area

General information
- Location: Korsør, Algade 25A, 4220 Korsør, Denmark
- Coordinates: 55°19′41.3″N 11°8′22.45″E
- Completed: 1761

Kongegården, also known as the Rasmus Langeland House, after its first owner, Rasmus Langeland, is a Rococo-style building now operated as a local cultural centre in Korsør, Denmark. The building was listed in the Danish registry of protected buildings and places in 1918.

== History ==
=== Rasmus Langeland ===
The building was constructed for merchant Rasmus Langeland in 1761. He had acquired the property in 1757. It adjoined his own house in Algade. His plan was to use the building as a high-end guesthouse for wealthy travellers waiting for better weather before crossing the Great Belt. In 1759, he opened a guesthouse in a rented building next door. In 1766, the license was transferred to his new building. Its first name was Store Værtshusgård. This name was later changed to Kongegården.

Langeland was also involved in shipping, whaling and ship-building. He went bankrupt in 1776. Kongegården had still not been sold at the time of his death in 1780.

=== Marcus Lauritzen ===
In 1780, Kongegården was sold by auction to the ship-owner Marcus Lauritzen (1737–95). He owned a number of properties in Korsør. His ships were sent to Iceland, where they bought dried fish which was then sold in Spain. Another ship was sent to the Danish West Indies. He kept Kongegården until his death in 1795.

=== Changing owners, 1796–1960s ===
In 1796, Kongegården was acquired by Poul Berg. His marriage to a wealthy widow had made him the wealthiest merchant in Korsør. He kept the estate until 1812.

In 1839, Jørgen Kruuse bought the building. He had started his career as a privateer during the Gunboard War. He had later made a fortune as a merchant, ship-owner, shipbuilder and brickyard owner. He owned a number of other properties in the town.

A later owner was Peder Thorvald Pedersen (1854–1933). He inherited the property in 1877. In 1801–02, he commissioned Aage Langeland-Mathiesen (a descendant of Rasmus Langeland) with restoring the neglected building complex.

=== Public ownership, 1960s–present ===
In the late 1980s, Kongegården was acquired by Korsør Municipality and Foreningen Kongegården and converted into the self-owning foundation Kongegårdsfonden. Since 1993, it has been operated as a local cultural centre.
