= Rådhusstræde 10 =

Listed building in Copenhagen

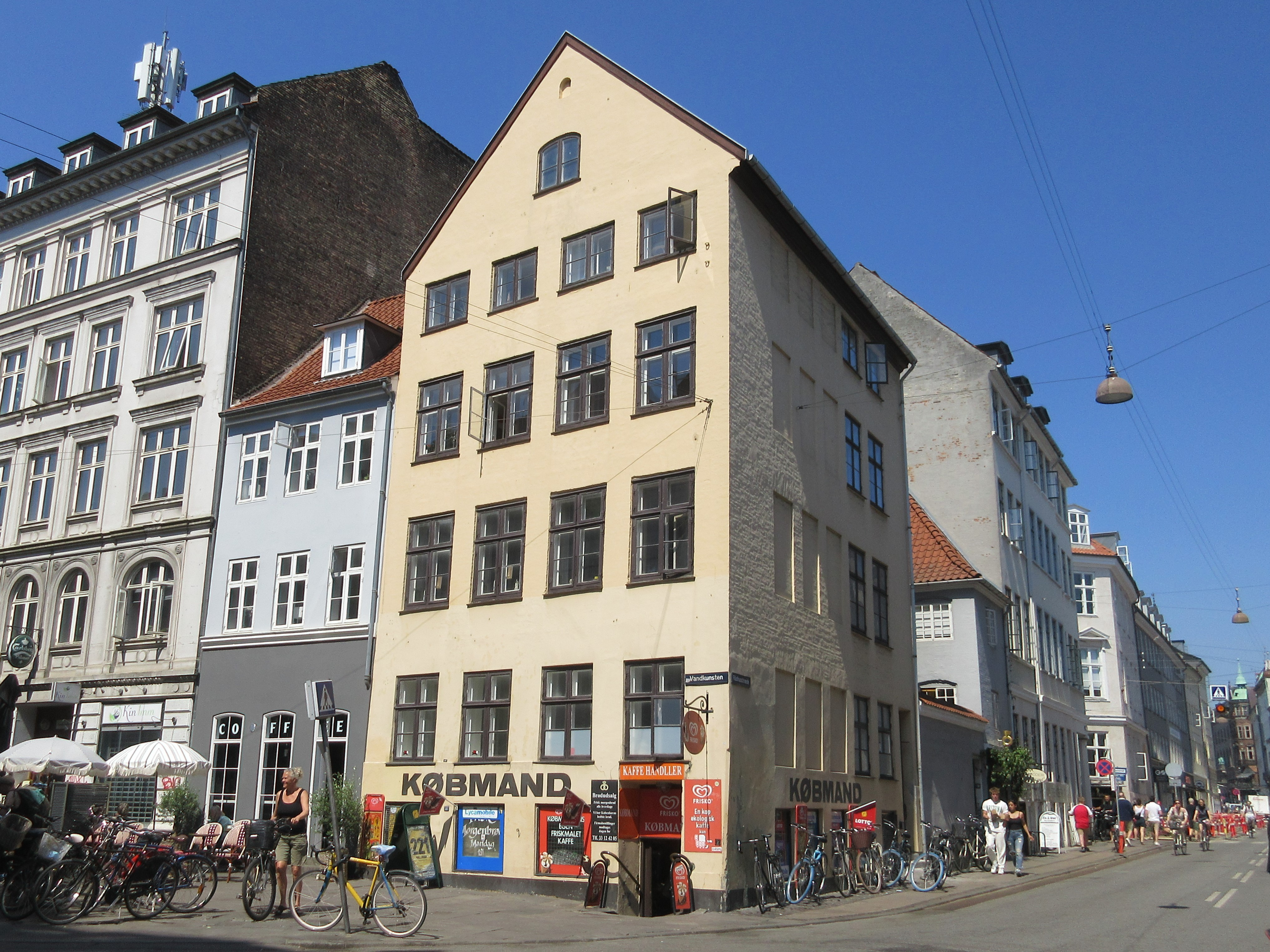
- Interactive map of the Rådhusstræde 10 area

General information
- Location: Copenhagen, Denmark
- Coordinates: 55°40′34.9″N 12°34′28.09″E
- Completed: 1750, 1935. 1951

Rådhusstræde 10 is a complex of 18th and 19th-century buildings situated at the corner of Rådhusstræde and Vandkunsten in the Old Town of Copenhagen, Denmark. It consists of a two-storey corner building from 1750, a three-storey building in Rådhusstræde from 1851 and a rear wing from 1835. The entire complex was listed in the Danish registry of protected buildings and places in 1945.

== History ==
=== 18th century ===
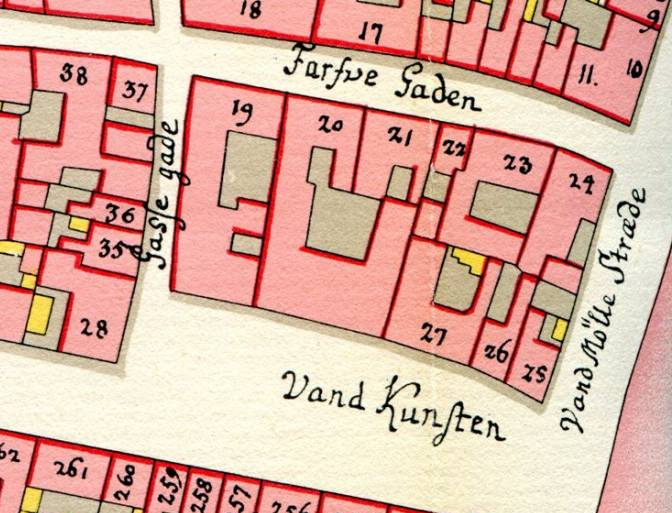
No. 25 seen in a detail from Christian Gedde's map of Copenhagen's West Quarter, 1757

The property was listed as No. 27 in the city's West Quarter (Vester Kvarter) in Copenhagen's first cadastre of 1689. It was at that time owned by Karen Herring, widow of Christoffer Herring. The current corner building was constructed at the site in 1750 for grocer (spækhøker) Knud Hansen Scheel. His property was listed as No. 25 in the new cadastre of 1756.

The property was later acquired by grocer Paul Mortensen. At the time of the 1787 census, No. 25 was home to 20 residents in five households. Paul Mortensen resided in the building with his wife Catharine Handrup and their one-year-old son Jørgen Mortensen. Philip Levi, a Jewish merchant, resided in another apartment with his wife Friderica Isac, their two children and one maid. Frederik Gids, a workman, resided in a third apartment with his wife Joanne Kirstine Lange. Isaac Israel, a Jewish butcher, resided in a fourth apartment with his wife Golde Eliases, their six children (aged one to 11) and one maid. The last resident was Anne Semsmeyer, a 68-year-old widow who supplemented her pension from the mail services by catering to diners.

The building just escaped the Fire of 1795. It continued westwards along the south side of Nytorv just a few houses further to the north.

=== 19th century ===
At the time of the 1801 census, Mortensen's building was home 20 19 residents in four households. Paul Mortensen was now residing in the building with his second wife Inger Christine Hofberg, their 11-year-old daughter Karen Margrethe and one maid. Helene Margaretha Weinvich, a 70-year-old widow with a pension, resided in another apartment with the 28-wear-old seamstress Mette Jensdatter. Sigrid Odsdatter, an unmarried seamstress, resided in a third apartment with her five-year-old son, a lodger (musician) and one maid. Meyer Isaach Littau, a 64-year-old pensioner, resided in a fourth apartment with his 49-year-old wife Evad Wulfdatter, their six children (one to 19) and one maid. Cecilie Hoffmann (née Aagaard), widow of a county surgeon, resided in the building with the 11-year-old boy Just Michael Kastrup and one maid.

The property was listed as No. 146 in the new cadastre of 1806. It was at that time still owned by Poul Mortensen. The property was owned by grocer (urtekræmmer) F.T. Schou. He constructed a small rear wing in 1835.

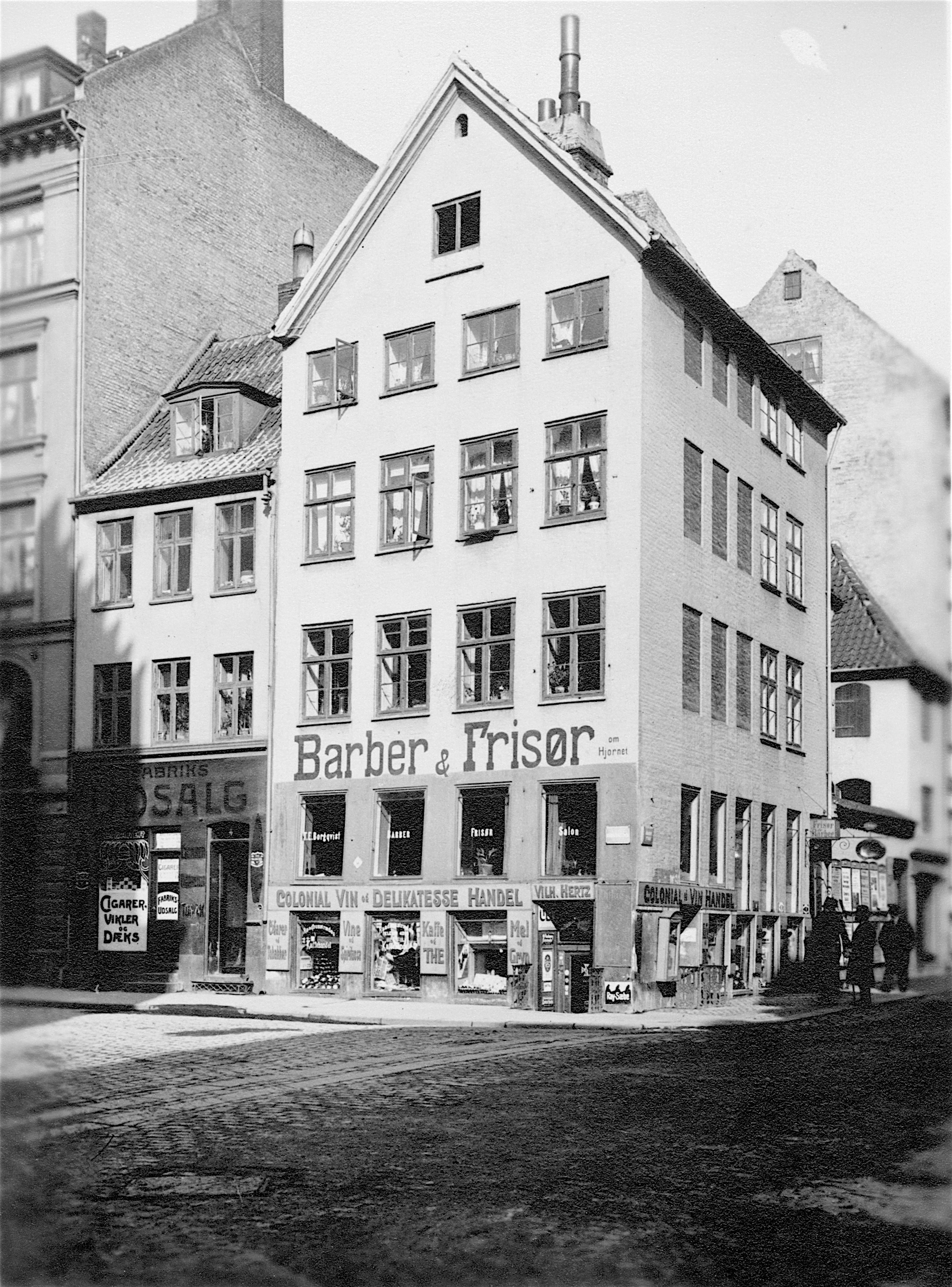
Rådhusstræde 10 photographed by Fritz Theodor Benzen in 1907

At the time of the 1840 census, No. 146 was home to ten residents in five households. Hans Thomas Hansen, a former tea and porcelain merchant, now working for Jørgen Bech, resided on the ground floor with his wife Marie Magdalene Hansen, his unmarried sister Agnete Marie Hansen and one maid. Aron Aronsen, a textile manufacturer, resided on the first floor with his wife Hanne Aronsen. their two children (aged three and four) and one maid. Severin Christian Brønnum, a joiner, resided on the second floor with his wife Johanne Marie Brønnum and their two children (aged one and three). Elise Frederikkke Petersen, a widow with a pension, resided on the third floor with Vilhelmine From (aged 16) and Jacob Ludvig Jacobsen (aged nine). Touguier Tinoille Schou, a grocer (urtekræmmer), resided in the basement with two employees.

The small building fronting Rådhusstræde was constructed in 1851 for grocer (urtekræmmer) K.J. Kragh.

At the time of the 1880 census, Rådhusstræde 10 was home to 20 residents. Lars Hendrik Theodor Jørgensen, a barber, resided on the ground floor with his wife Johanne Dorothea Jørgensen and his 21-year-old employee Frederik Vilhelm Theodor Jørgensen. Ludvig Andreas Sundbye Kongsted (1830–1893), a grocer (urtekræmmer), resided on the first floor with his wife Maren Adolphine Caroline Kongsted (née Brandes, 1833–1919), their five children (aged seven to 18), a 19-year-old employee in his business and one maid. Julie Johanne Hansen (née Reedt), a widow, resided on the second floor with her 11-year-old daughter Dagmar Alexandra Julie Kirstine Hansen and one maid. Lars Larsen, a coachman, resided on the third floor with his wife Johanne Marie Larsen (née Christiansen) and their son Niels Christian Larsen. Martine Vilhelmine Soelberg, a 38-year-old widow cleaning lady, resided in the garret (fourth floor) with her 12-year-old son Georg Frederik Soelberg.

== Architecture ==
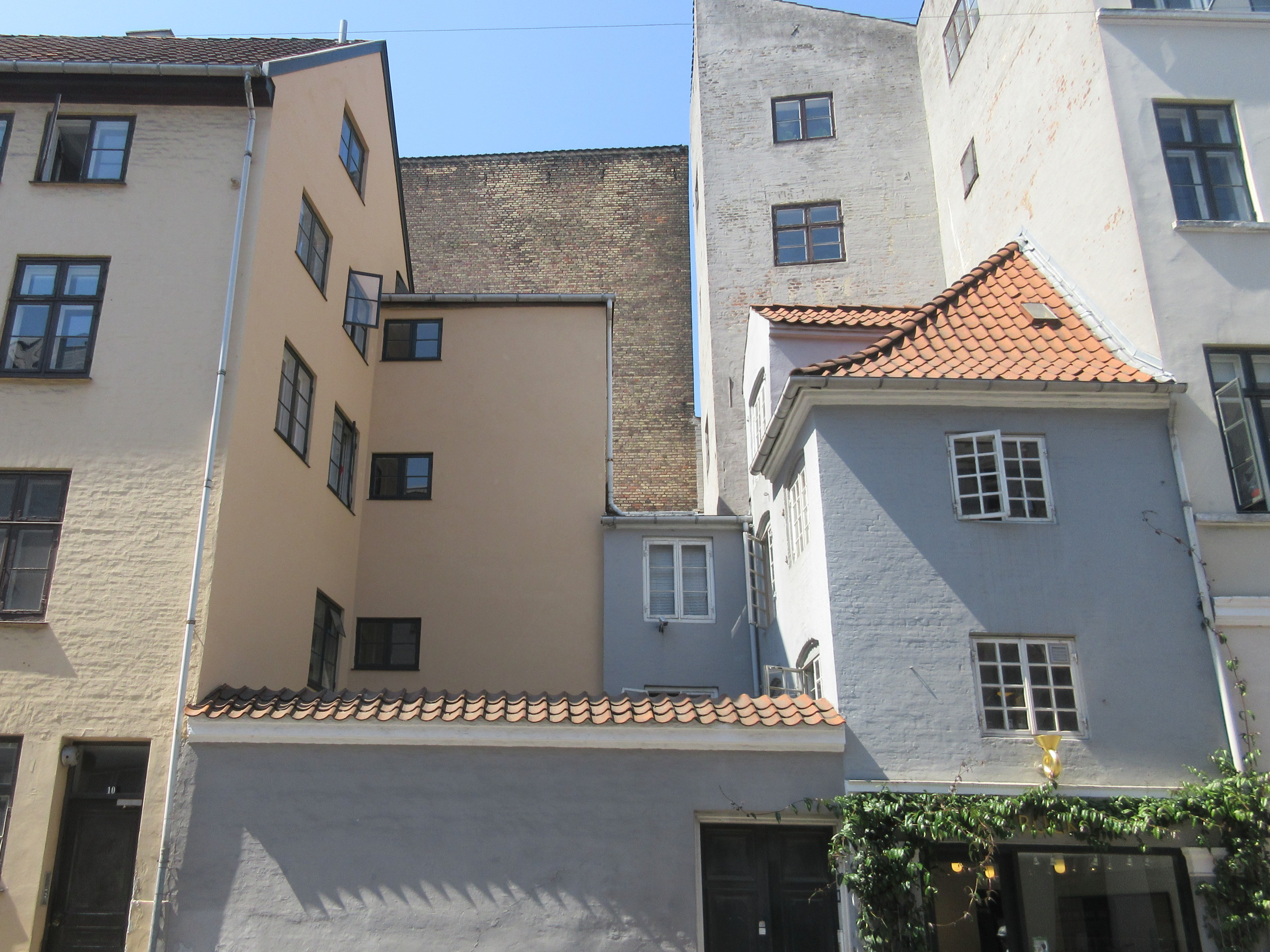
The complex seen from Rådhusstræde

Rådhusstræde 10 is constructed with four storeys over a walk-out basement. It has a five-bay-long facade towards Rådhusstræde and a four-bay-wide gable towards the square. Many of the windows towards Rådhusstræde have been bricked up on the upper floors. The facade is plastered and painted in a pale yellow colour. A staircase projects from the rear side of the building. It was originally constructed with timber framing but the ground floor and a gable were rebuilt in brick in 1935. The staircase is attached to a two-storey building from 1835. It is again attached to a three-storey building from 1951 whose gable fronts Rådhusstræde. The 1951 building is topped by a monopitched, hipped red tile roof. A brick wall topped by red tiles connects the corner building from 1750 to the 1851 building in Rådhusgade, closing off a small courtyard in front of the staircase and the 1835 from the street. The facade of the 1851 building is towards the yard crowned by a wall dormer.

== Today ==
The property is owned by E/F Rådhusstræde 10. The corner building contains two condominiums on the ground floor and one on each of the upper floors. The basement and the low building in Rådhusstræde are each home to a shop.

== Gallery ==
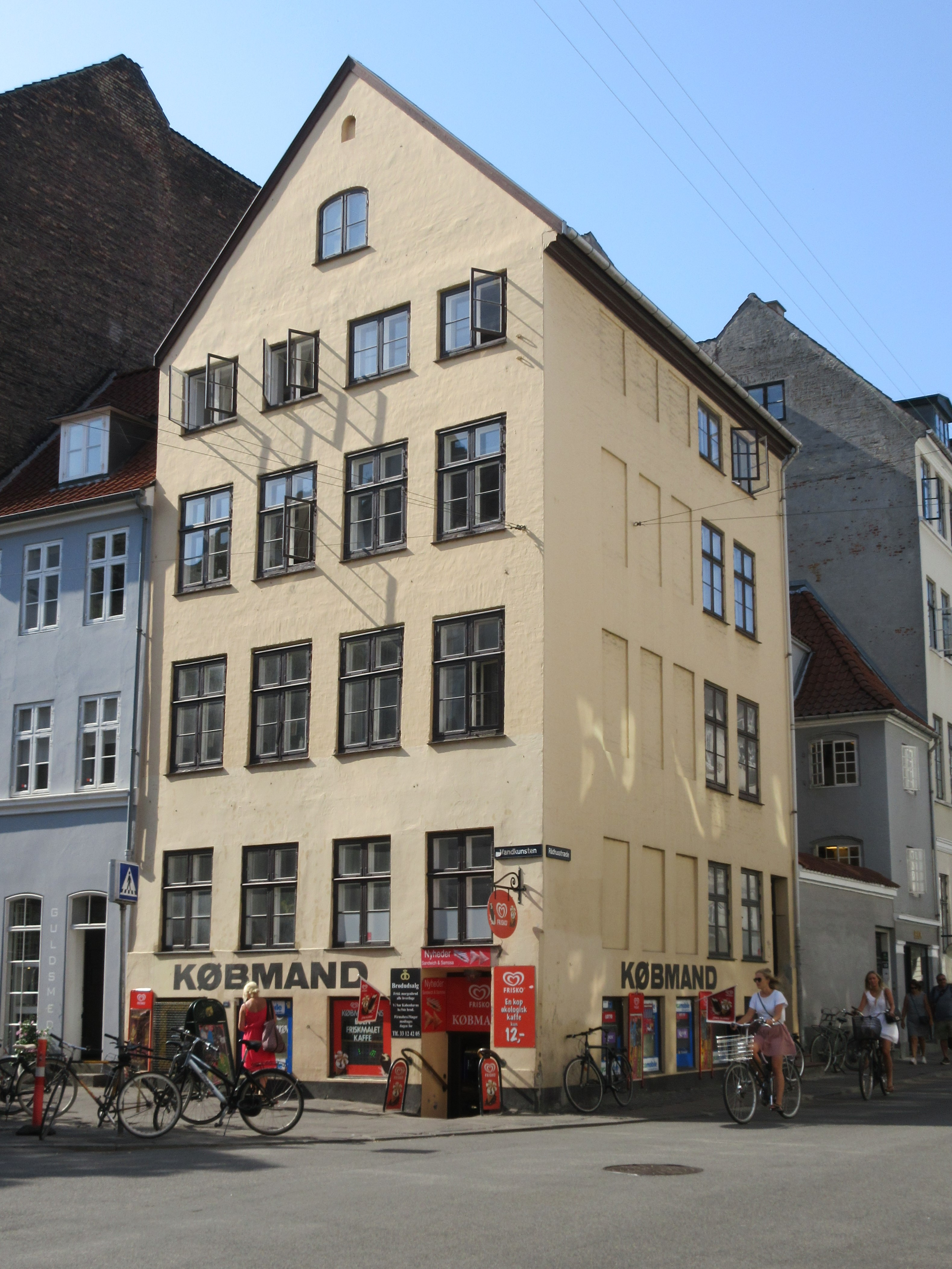
The corner building from 1750

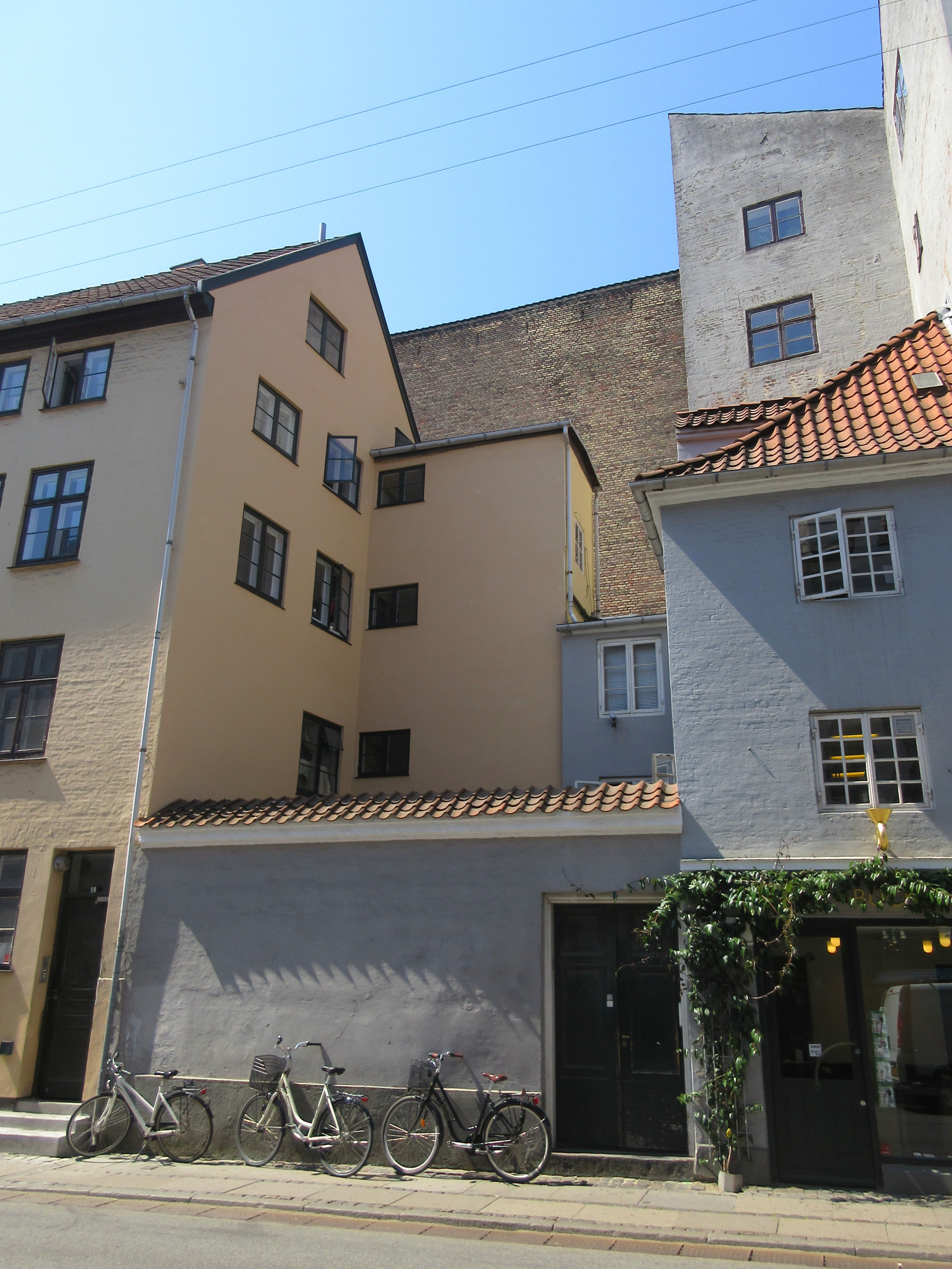
The complex seen from Rådhusstræde
