= Carl Løffler =

Danish decorative painter

Carl Johan Albrecht Løffler (23 July 1810 – 28 July 1853) was a Danish decorative painter. He died in the 1853 Copenhagen cholera outbreak.

== Early life and education ==
Løffler was the son of building painter Johan Carl Albrecht Løffler (1778 - 16 May 1835) and Martha Marie Dorothea, née Fiedler (1787-1867). He apprenticed as a painter while attending the Royal Danish Academy of Fine Arts from 1825. In 1836, he became a pupil of the model school and won the small silver medal. The following year, he became a master painter with distinction, completing his apprenticeship.

== Career ==
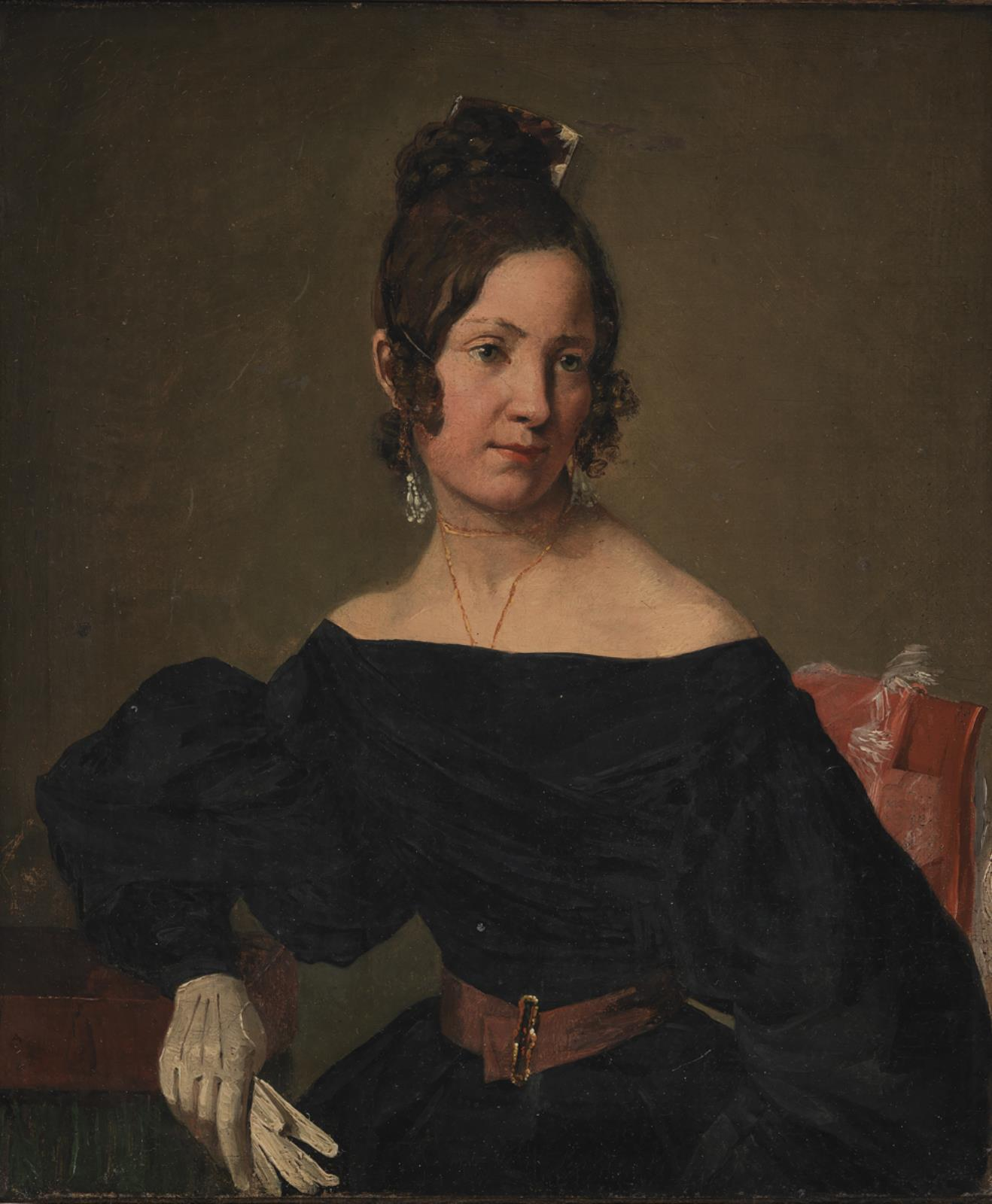
The actress Anna Nielsen painted by Løffler

In 1838, Løffler decorated four rooms in Pompeian Styles for merchant Hans Puggaard and one room for professor N.C.L. Abrahams. He later received a stipend from the Academy to study the excavations at Herculaneum and Pompeii in Italy. After returning to Denmark in January 1842, he also took up glass painting. In 1845, he competed for the Neuhausen Prize with an example of this genre. He was commissioned to create two glass paintings for Christian IV's Chapel at Roskilde Cathedral, but they were not installed as planned and were later used in the rebuilding of Frederiksborg Castle. They were eventually installed behind the smaller of the two organs in Frederiksborg Chapel.

In 1846, Løffler succeeded Peter Kongslev as a teacher at the Academy's ornamentation school. In 1852, he also took over the position of heraldic painter at Ordenskapitlet from Ole Larsen.

== Personal life ==
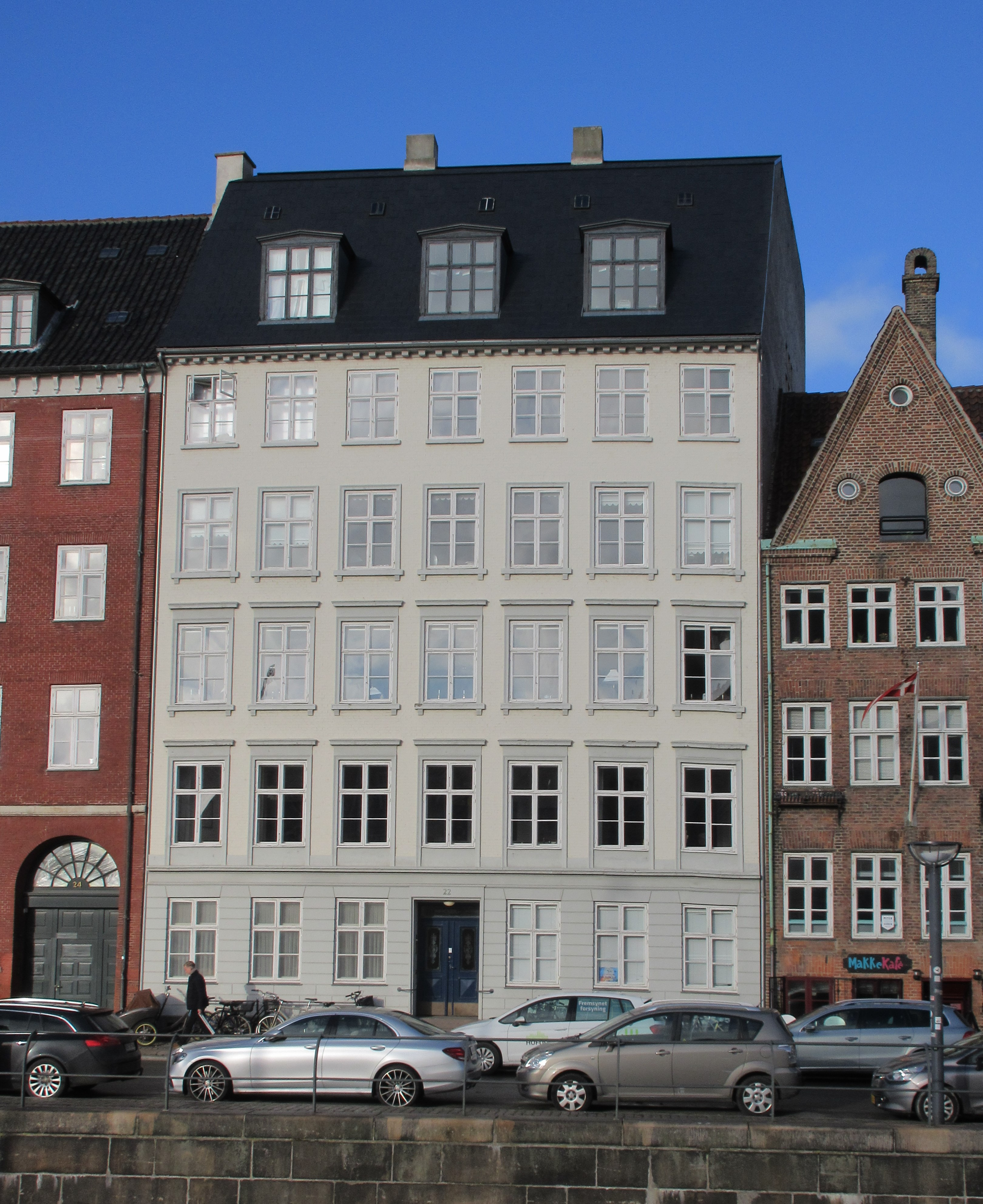
Nybrogade 22 in Copenhagen

On 23 November 1832, Løffler married Wilhelmine Louise Ludovika Hacke (26 March 1810 - 23 February 1900), the daughter of customs officer Johann Julius Ludvig Hacke and Jacobine Christine, née Ging.

In 1852-53, he commissioned the construction of the property at Nybrogade 22. However, he died of cholera on 28 July of the same year, becoming one of approximately 4,800 victims of the 1853 Copenhagen cholera outbreak. He is buried in Assistens Cemetery.
