= Thomas Jacobsen (violin maker) =

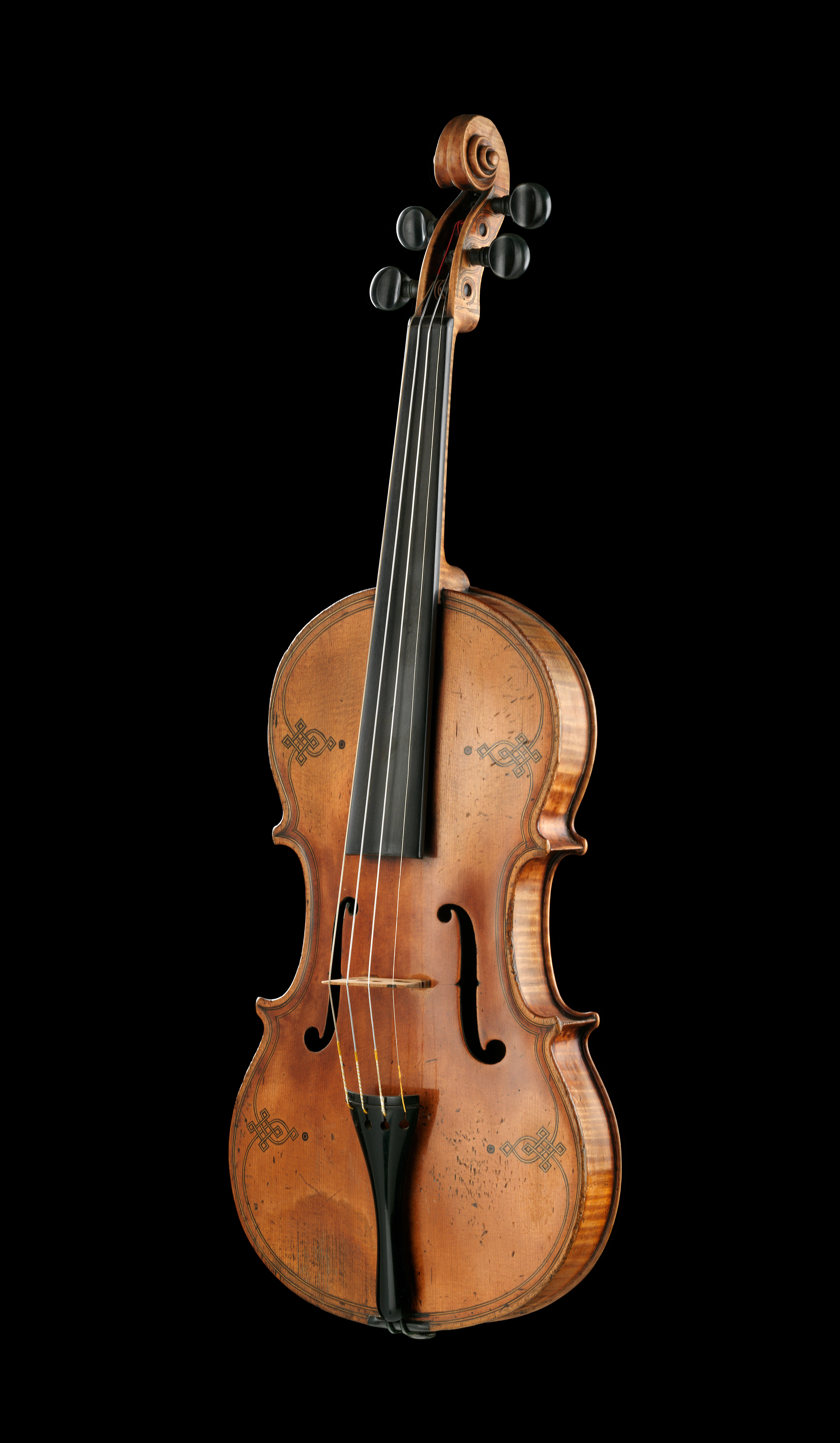
An 1848 violin by Jacobsen in the National Museum of Denmark.

Thomas Jacobsen (1810-1853) was a Danish violin maker who operated his own workshop in Copenhagen from 1846 and was granted status of court violin maker.

== Biography ==
Jacobsen was initially apprenticed to a carpenter, Peder Hansen Holm, in Jutland, and then to Niels Jensen Lund in Copenhagen.

In 1841-44, he worked independently as a violin maker in Copenhagen. He then went on a longer journey abroad to further his education, working for among others for Vuillaume in Paris, Back in Denmark, in 1847, he started his own workshop in Copenhagen with status of court violin maker. He died from cholera in the 1853 Copenhagen cholera outbreak.
