= 1853 Copenhagen cholera outbreak =

Cholera outbreak in Denmark

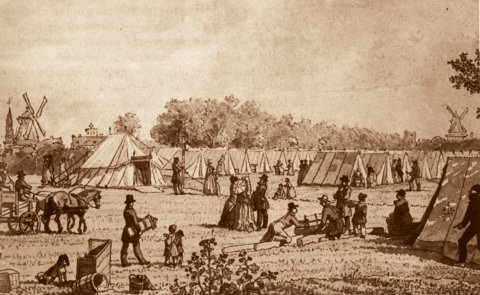
A tent camp outside the Western City Gate during the outbreak

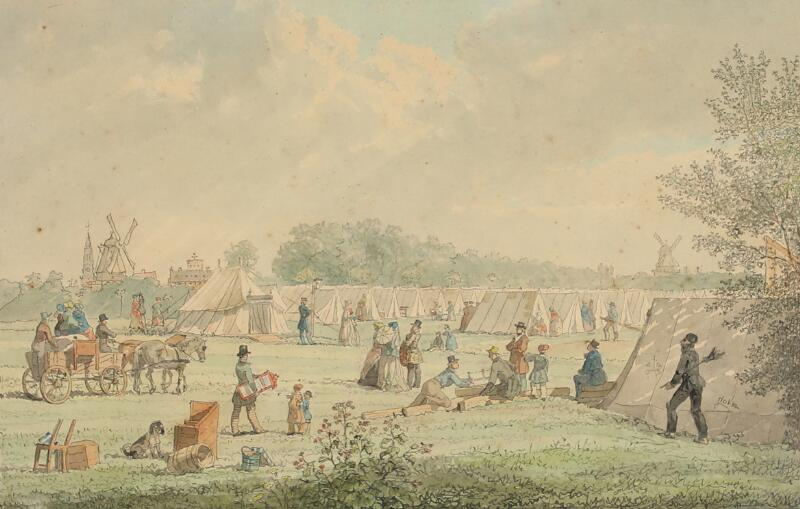
The cholera camp outside Vesterport.

The 1853 Copenhagen cholera outbreak was a severe outbreak of cholera which occurred in Copenhagen, Denmark in 1853 as part of the third cholera pandemic. It killed about 4,800 people.

The outbreak has been blamed on the dismal sanitary conditions of the city, in combination with the overpopulation caused by a ban on the expansion of urban development outside the area covered by the fortifications of Copenhagen. The outbreak lasted from June to October, 1853.

Among the changes in the city in the aftermath of the outbreak, was the decommissioning of Copenhagen's fortifications, the construction of a new Brown Meat District and the Cisternerne to provide for a safer water supply, and the new housing development of Brumleby in Østerbro under the directions of the Medical Society. It was Denmark's first example of social housing.

== Background ==
Medical professionals had since the 1840s warned against the dismal sanitary conditions in the city as a combination of a lack of proper sanitary installations and services and increasing overpopulation due to the ban of urban development outside the City Walls.

== Outbreak ==
The outbreak struck on 11 June 1853 and lasted until October when it faded out. A total of 7,219 infections were reported of whom 4,737 (56,7%) died. From Copenhagen the outbreak spread to the provinces where 24 towns were hit and 1,951 people died.

== Aftermath ==
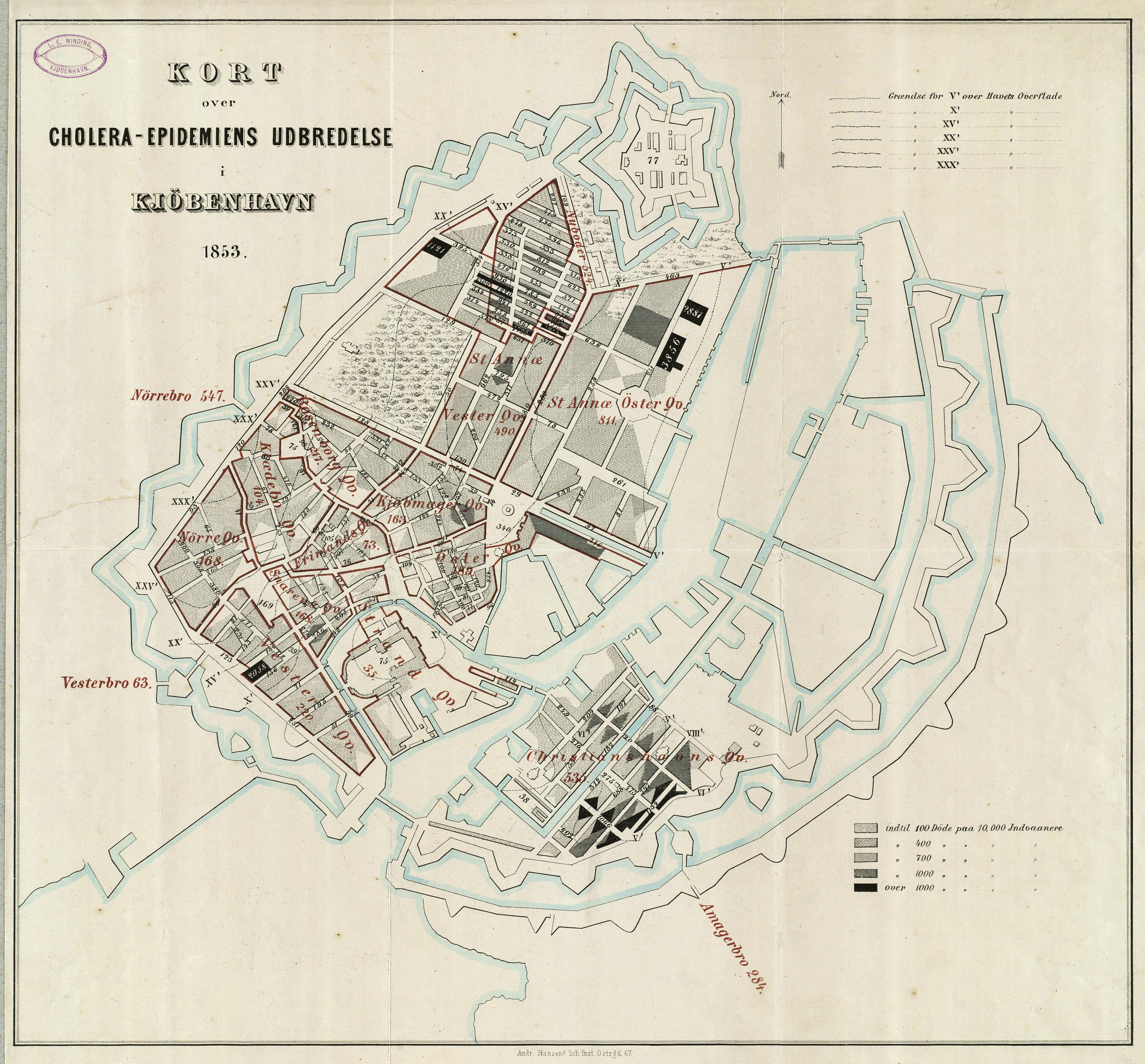
Map of the distribution.

The cholera outbreak was a key factor in the decision to decommission Copenhagen's fortifications, although the step was long overdue and had been underway for decades. The cholera outbreak also contributed to the city's decision to build a new cattle market, the so-called Brown Meat District, and a safer municipal water supply.

It also resulted in several housing developments built by philanthropic organisations to provide healthy homes outside the city centre for people of few means. The Medical Society completed the first stage of the housing development now known as Brumleby in Østerbro in 1857. They are considered Denmark's first example of social housing. The Classenske Fideicommis acquired a three-hectare site in Frederiksberg in 1856 and constructed the Classen Terraces (De Classenske Boliger) between 1866 and 1881.

== Notable victims ==
- Frederik Clauson-Kaas, hofmarskal
- Christoffer Wilhelm Eckersberg, painter
- Peter Christoph Hagemann, architect
- Carl Henckel, printmaker
- Frantz Christopher von Jessen, overpostmester
- Carl Løffler, decorative painter
- Jacob Ræder, military officer
- Adolph Schätzig, photographer
- Thomas Jacobsen, instrumentmaker
- Sidsel Margrethe Kofoed (Møller)

== See also ==
- List of epidemics
