= Nybrogade 24 =

Building in Copenhagen

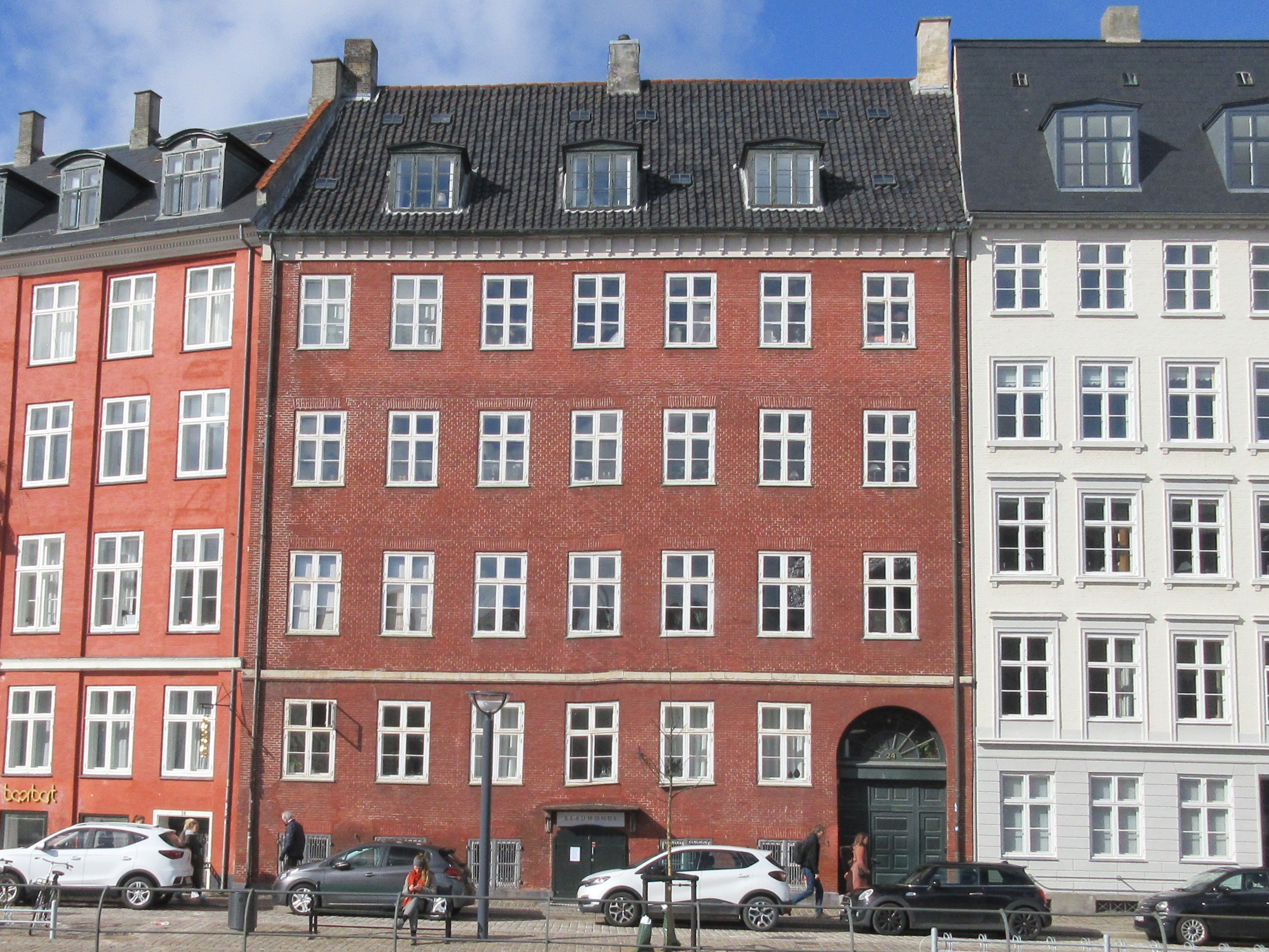

General information
- Location: Copenhagen, Denmark
- Coordinates: 55°40′34.46″N 12°34′32.95″E
- Completed: 1817

Nybrogade 24 is an early 19th-century property overlooking the Slotsholmen Canal in central Copenhagen, Denmark. It comprises a four-storey, seven-bays-wide residential building towards the canal and a warehouse at Magstræde 11 on the other side of the block as well as a small courtyard between the two buildings. The entire complex was built in 1815-17 for the wealthy merchant and ship-owner Jørgen Peter Bech, grandfather of the writer Wilhelm Bergsøe who provides an affectionate account of his many visits as a child in his 1898 memoirs De forbistrede drenge. The entire complex was listed in the Danish registry of protected buildings and places in 1918.

== History ==
=== Early history ===
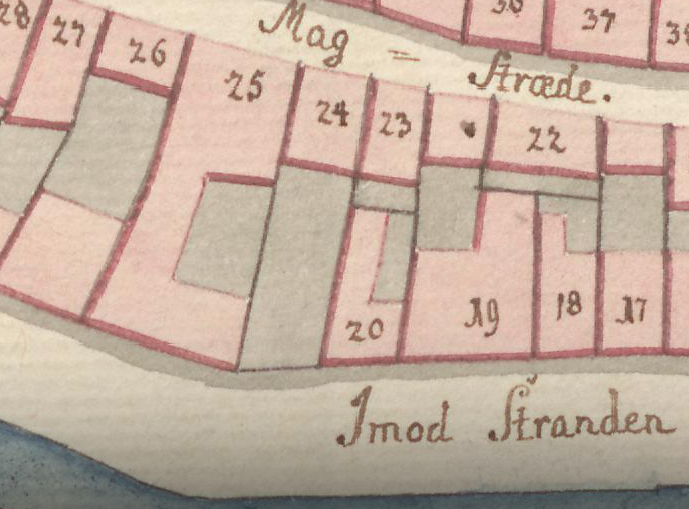
No. 20, No. 23 and No. 24 seen on a detail from Christian Gedde's map of Snaren's Quarter, 1756.

The site was formerly made up of two properties. The larger of these properties was listed in Copenhagen's first cadastre of 1689 as No. 29 in Snaren's Quarter, owned by merchant Hans Muus. The other one was listed as No. 30 in Snaren's Quarter, owned by city builder (stadsbygmester) Christoffer Gross,

No. 29 and No. 30 were later owned by a skipper named Larsen. On 21 June 1734, he sold them to the Jewish tobacco manufacturer and merchant Salomon Solomonsen. He had seven sons and four daughters.

No. 29 was later divided into two properties, one in Nybrogade and one in Snaregade. The property in Nybrogade was listed in the new cadastre of 1756 as No. 20 and belonged to skipper Niels Christensen Spering at that time. The building in Snaregade was listed as No. 23 and belonged to Salomon Solomonsen. The old No. 30 was listed as No. 24 and was also owned by Salomon Solomonsen,

No. 20 was home to 17 residents in three households at the time of the 1787 census. Eilert Madsen, a captain sailing on the Danish West Indies, resided in the building with his wife Eva Hingst, their two sons (aged three and four), two maids and one lodger. Christiane Belling, a widow, resided in the building with the lodger Lars Brund (a royal lackey) and one maid. Christen Pedersen Bramer, a beer seller (øltapper) and stableman for Prince Abel Catrine Ols Datter, their two daughters (aged two and seven) and three lodgers.

No. 23/24 was home to 28 residents in seven households at the 1787 census. Andres Nielsen Eggeroed, a master mason and its owner, resided in the building with his wife Johanne Poulsen, a caretaker and two maids. Georg Nicolai Almer, an army captain, resided in the building with one maid. Christian Magdalus Thestrup Cold, a lawyer and later Chief of Police in Copenhagen, resided in the building with his wife Beata Nissen, their three children (aged one to seven) and two maids. Helena Ambrosia Kisby (née Brink), widow of professor of theology Hans Kisby, resided in the building with her son Johannes Anbrosius Kisby (secretary and auditor in the Danish Chancery) and one maid. Sofie Amalia Arnkiel (1645), a widow, resided in the building with two daughters (aged 24 and 26), an 11-year-old grandson, one maid and one lodger (student). Peder Hansen, a beer seller (øltapper), resided in the building with his wife Sidsel Lars Datter, their two-year-old son Hans Christian, one maid and one lodger.

No. 20 was again listed with the same cadastral number in the new cadastre of 1806 as No. 20 and belonged to Christian Cramer at that time. The old No. 23/24 was listed as No. 26 and belonged to master mason Poul Eegeroed (1761-1827).

=== Jørgen Peter Bech and the new building ===
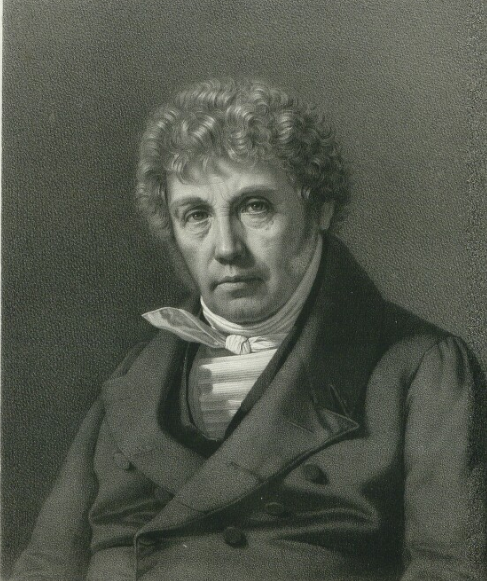
Jørgen Peter Bech

The two properties were later acquired by the wealthy businessman Jørgen Peter Bech (1782-1846). He was already the owner of the neighbouring building Den Sorte Hane (The Black Cock). He replaced the old buildings on his new property with the current ones in 1815–17. No. 20 and No. 26 were formally merged into one property in 1817.

The master mason Thomas Blom was charged with the construction of the buildings. The bricks for the new buildings arrived to the construction site by barge on 12 May 1815. Piling started on 27 June and lasted for around one month. The building fronting the canal was topped out on 26 September the same year. Construction of the warehouse in Magstræde began on 4 June 1816. The total construction cost was 6,500 rigsdaler.

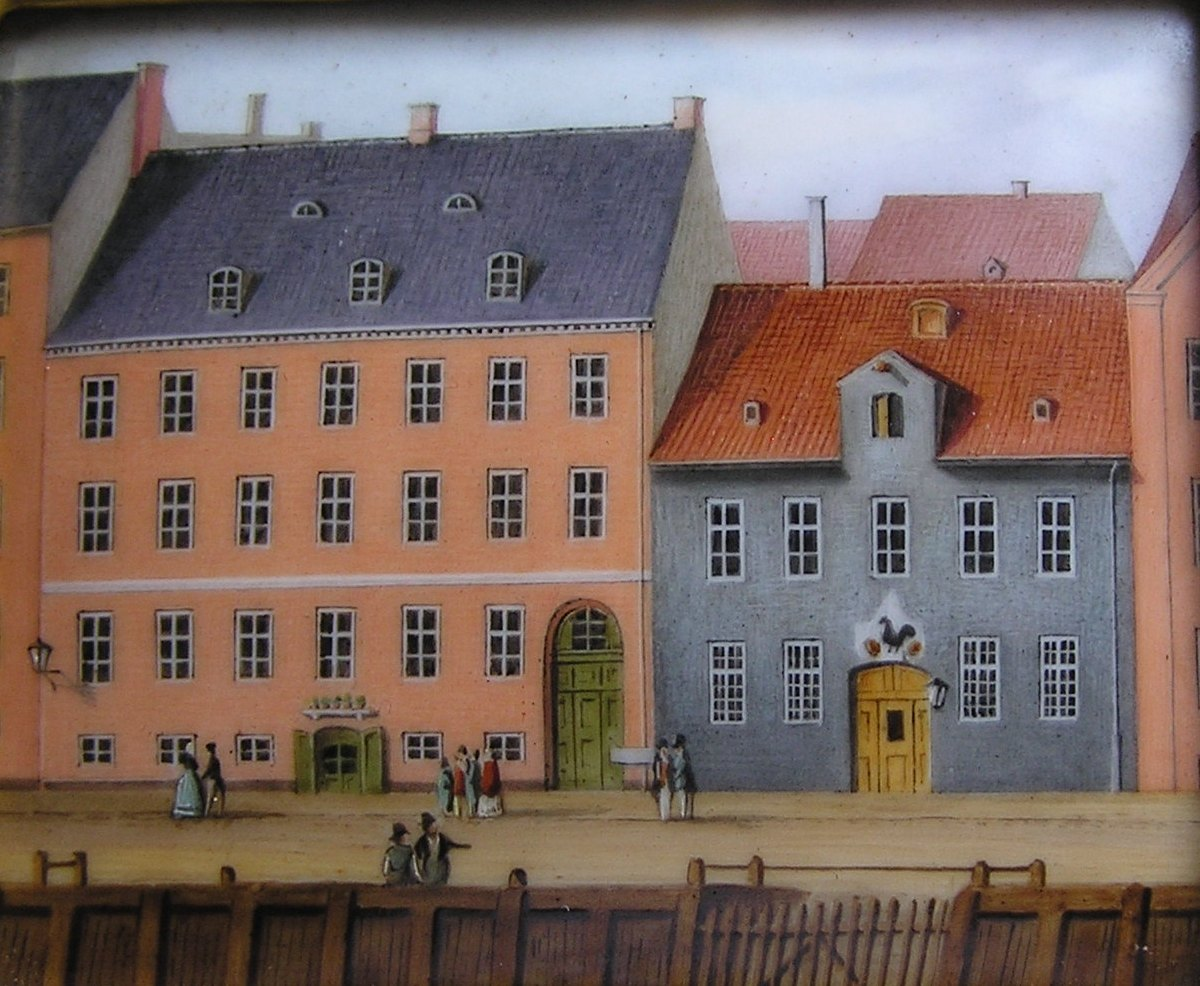
Beck's new building (before the fourth floor was added in 1853( seen next to his old building The Black Cock.

Bech was married to Ellen Sophie Magdalene Meyer (1784-1846). Her father, Jacob Albert Meyer, a grocer (urtekræmmer) and tea and porcelain merchant, had owned the property at Gammel Strand No. 13 (now Gammel Strand 44). The Bech family moved into their new home on 19 October. They had four children by the time that their new home was completed: Jørgen Albert (1808-1876), Louise Sophie (1810-1845), Edvard (1812-1873) and August Willads (1815-1871). The Black Cock was from then on only used as the firm's office and as a residence for the clerk Nyholm and the family's physician Dr. Crone. The Bech family's fifth and sixth child Claus (1817-1889) and Ida Marie (1825-1786) were born in 1817 and 1825.

Bech was the maternal grandfather of the writer Wilhelm Bergsøe. Bergsøe often visited the house on Sundays and in holidays and has described his grandfather's home in Nybrogade in De forbistrede børn.

Henriette Holck (née Lund) rented the ground floor of the building when her husband Carl Christian Holck died in 1816. She and her husband had for a while lived in Tunis where the husband served as Danish consul. Henriette Holck moved in 1823. Her husband's cousin Jacob Elias Holck (1776-1842) rented the ground-floor apartment from 1831 until his death in 1842.

Jørgen Peter Bech resided in the building with his wife, three of their children, his sister-in-law Anne Marie Schmidt and two maids at the 1840 census. Jacob Elias Holck, registered as renteskriver now with title of justitsrpd, resided in the building with his wife Wilhelmine A. Golck (née Mariager), their foster daughter Chatrine Marie Mariager one maid. Helene Dajon (1854-), widow of materialforvalter Claus Dajon (1751-1812), resided in the building with one maid. Bech had purchased his country house Kalkbrænderiet from her.

=== Anthon Michael Nyholm ===
Beck's former employee Anthon Michael Nyholm (1814-1870) was later licensed as a merchant (grosserer) in his own right. He married on 19 September 1846 Marie Magdalene Mortensen (1827-1884)- The couple had five children. They were among the residents of the building both at the 1850 and 1860 census, indicating that Nyholm had either purchased the building or that it was still owned by the Beck family.

The property was home to three households at the 1850 census. Anthon and Marie Nyholm resided on the first floor with their first child, Anne (aged), (née Mortensen), one male servant and three maids. Benedicte Ulfsparre de Tuxen (1790-1877), widow of admiral Carl Adolph Rothe, resided on the second floor with one maid. Katharine Dichmann, a widow, resided on the ground floor with the unmarried woman Jacobine Møller and one maid.

The building in Nybrogade was heightened with one storey in 1853. The two buildings were listed as Nybrogade 24 and Magstræde 11 when house numbering (by street) was introduced as a supplement to the old cadastral numbers (by quarter) in 1859.

The property was home to 17 residents at the time of the 1860 census. Anthon and Marie Nyholm were now residing on the third floor with their three first children and one maid. Bendicte Rothe, widow of Ehrenreich Christopher Ludvig Koefoed, resided on the second floor with Cathrine Colen and one maid. Two unmarried women, Bartholomine Aagesen and Frederikke Caroline Suhr, resided on the first floor. Suhr was the younger sister of Bech's son-in-law, Ole Berendt Suhr.

Nyholm partnered with Adolph Frederiksen (1819-1901) in 1855, trading as Nyholm & Frederiksen. The firm was a paper wholesale business, representing Drewsen & Sønner. The firm was from its establishment based a little down the canal at Ved Stranden 14 and from 1856 at Ved Stranden 2 (corner of Golmens Kanal, demolished). The firm was after Nyholm's death in 1870 continued by Frederiksen. It existed until 1985.

One of Nyholm's children, a noy who died just two years old in 1859, was given the name ørgen Peter Bech Nyholm (1854-1856). His daughter Ingeborg was (1850-1887) married Andreas von Eggers (1848-1887), a baron and vetenarian.

=== 1880 census ===
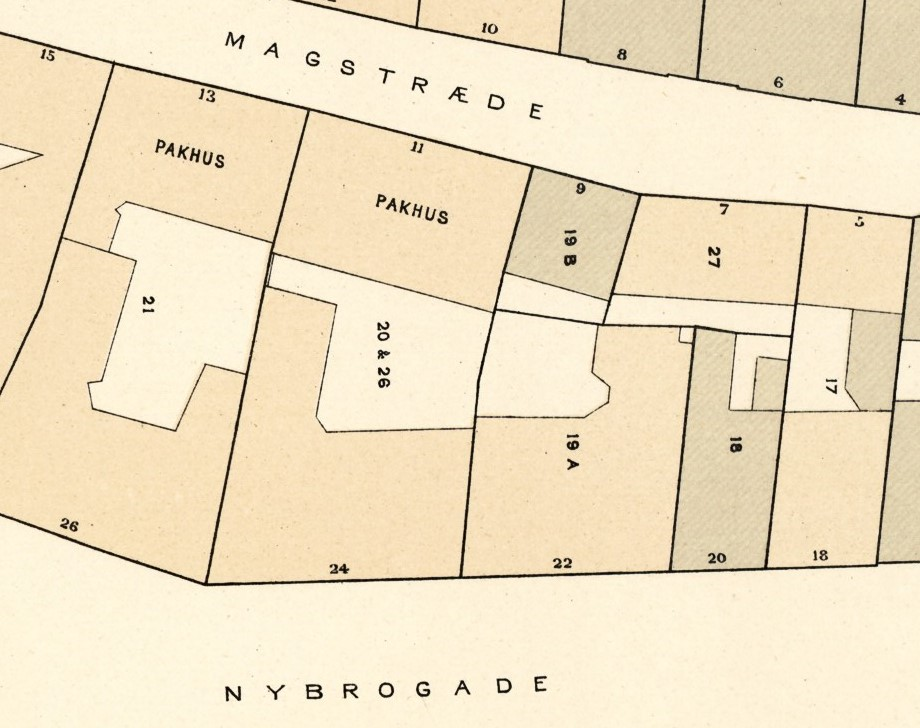
Nybrogade 24 seen on a detail from Berggreen's cadastral map of Snaren's Quarter, 1884.

The property was home to 19 residents at the time of the 1880 census. Christian Elias Ferdinand Fog, a businessman (grosserer), resided on the ground floor with two floor clerks, two male servants and one maid. Sophie Mathiesen (1815-1892, née Suhr), widow of army captain Johannes Frederik Ludvig Mathiesen and sister of Ole Berendt Suhr, resided on the first floor with one maid. Rose Rosen (née Fog), a widow, resided on the second floor with her two daughters (aged 12 and 15) and one maid. Susanne Henriette Schmidt (1731-1895, née Suhr), widow of naval captain Ludvig Frederik Schmidt and also a sister of Ole Bernt Suhr, resided on the same floor with one maid. Emilius Qvirinius Hansen, a businessman (grosserer), resided on the third floor with his wife Johanne Elisabeth Hansen (née Christensen), his wife's niece Emilie Marie Christensen and one maid.

=== 20th century ===
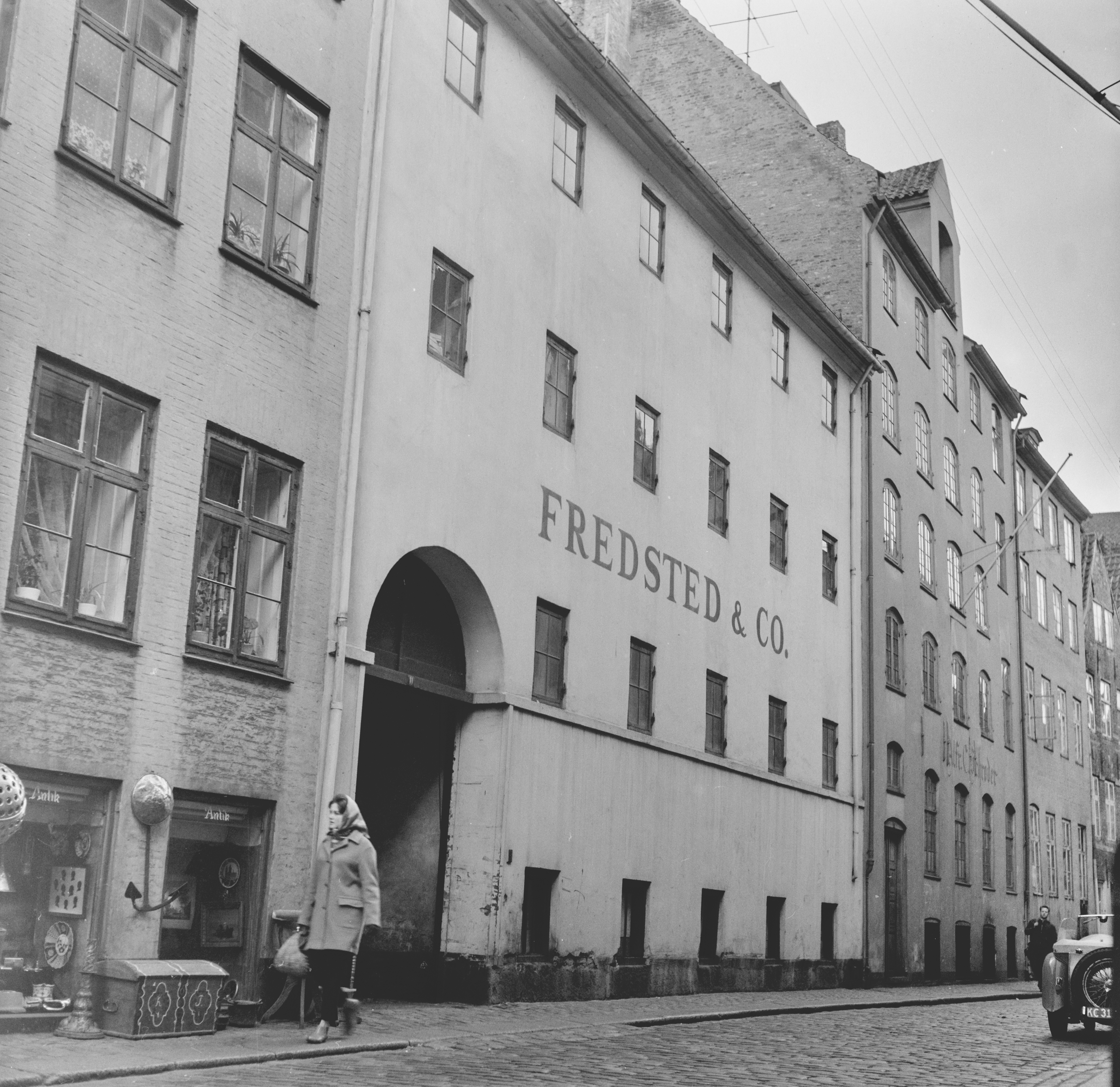
Magstræde 11 in 1961.

The property was home to a total of 15 residents at the time of the 1906 census.

Valdemar Fredsted established a tea wholesale company at Magstræde 11 in 1917. Fredsted & Co. was based in the building until at least the early 1960s.

== Architecture ==
Nybrogade 24 is constructed with four storeys over a walk-out basement. The undressed red brick facade is finished by a white cornice band above the ground floor and a white, dentillated cornice under the roof. The green-painted gate is topped by a fanlight. The pitched roof is clad in black tiles and features three dormer windows towards the street. It is pierced by three chimneys. A four-bay perpendicular side wing extends from the rear side of the building.

== Today ==
The building was in 2008 owned by Teglholms Have APS. It has later been sold as condominiums.

== Gallery ==
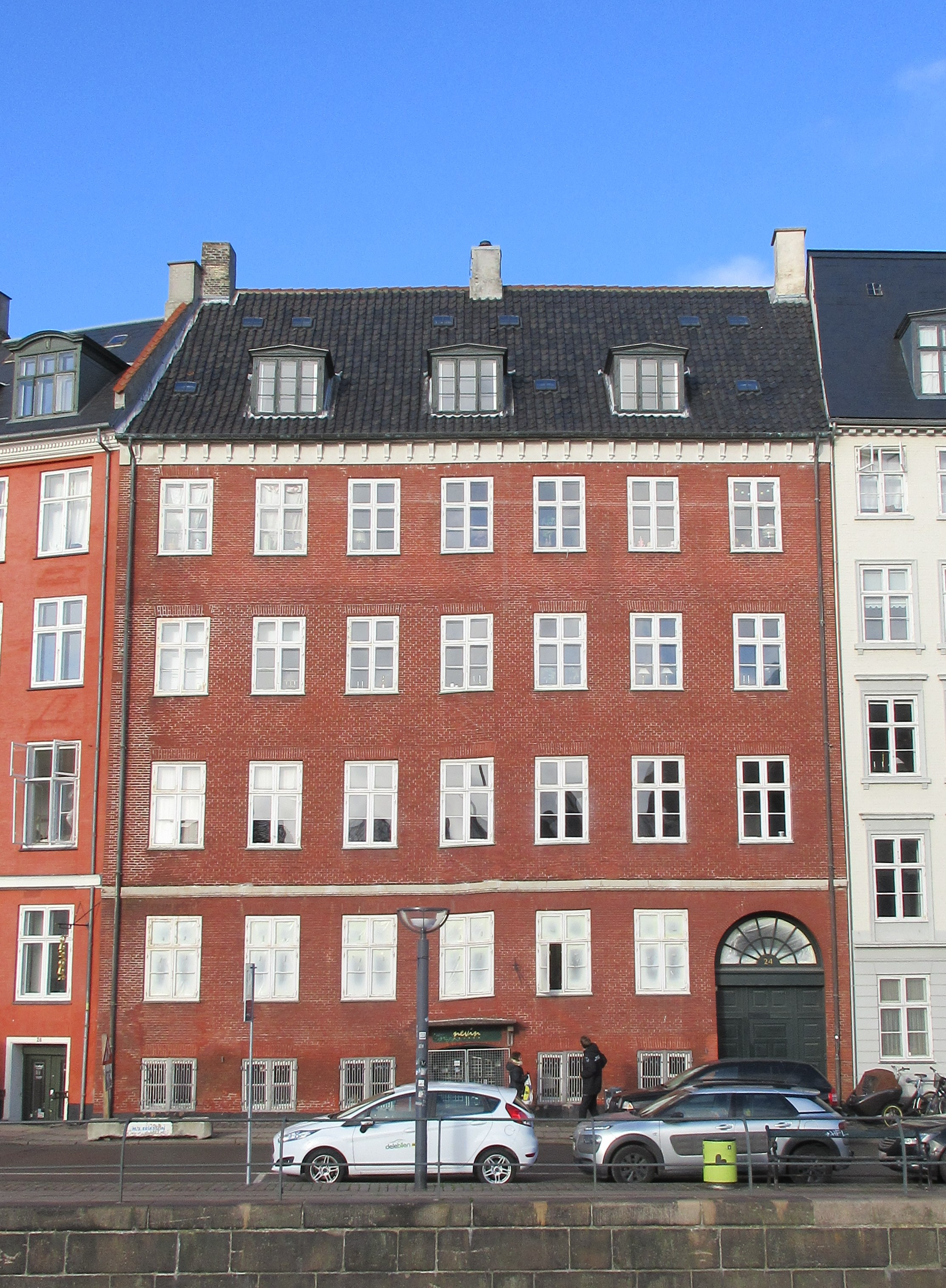
Nybrogade 24

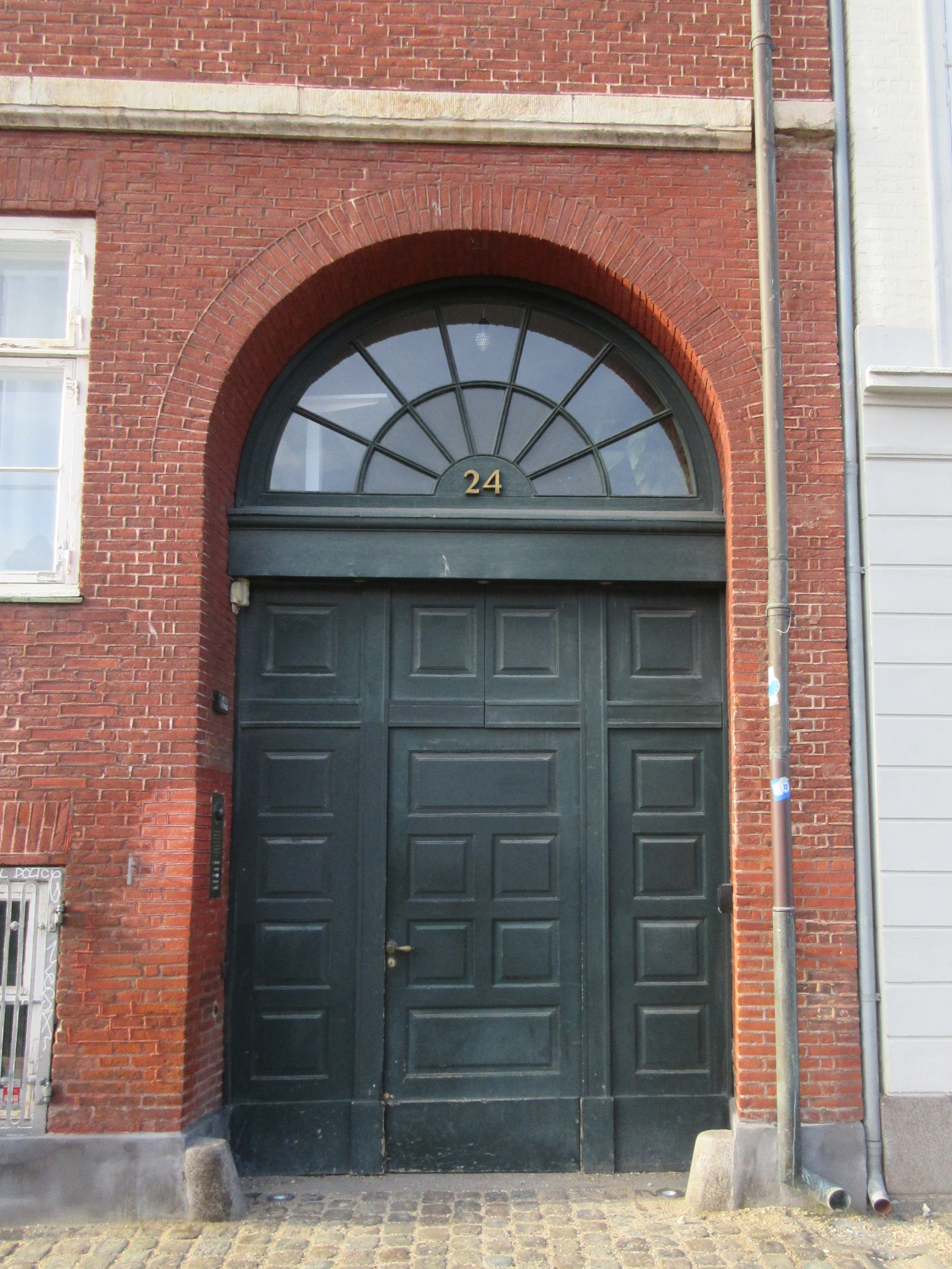
The gate

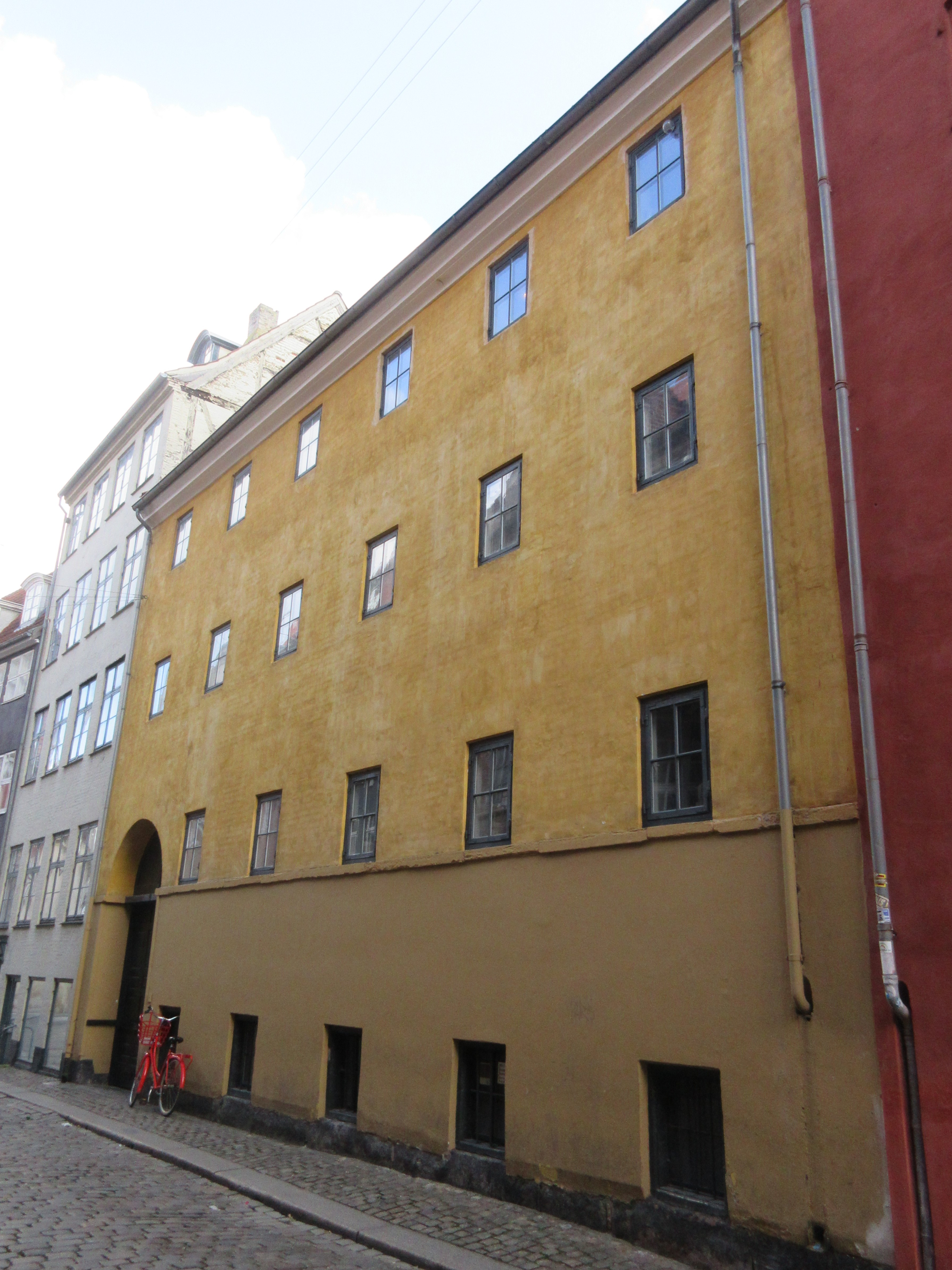
Magstræde 11

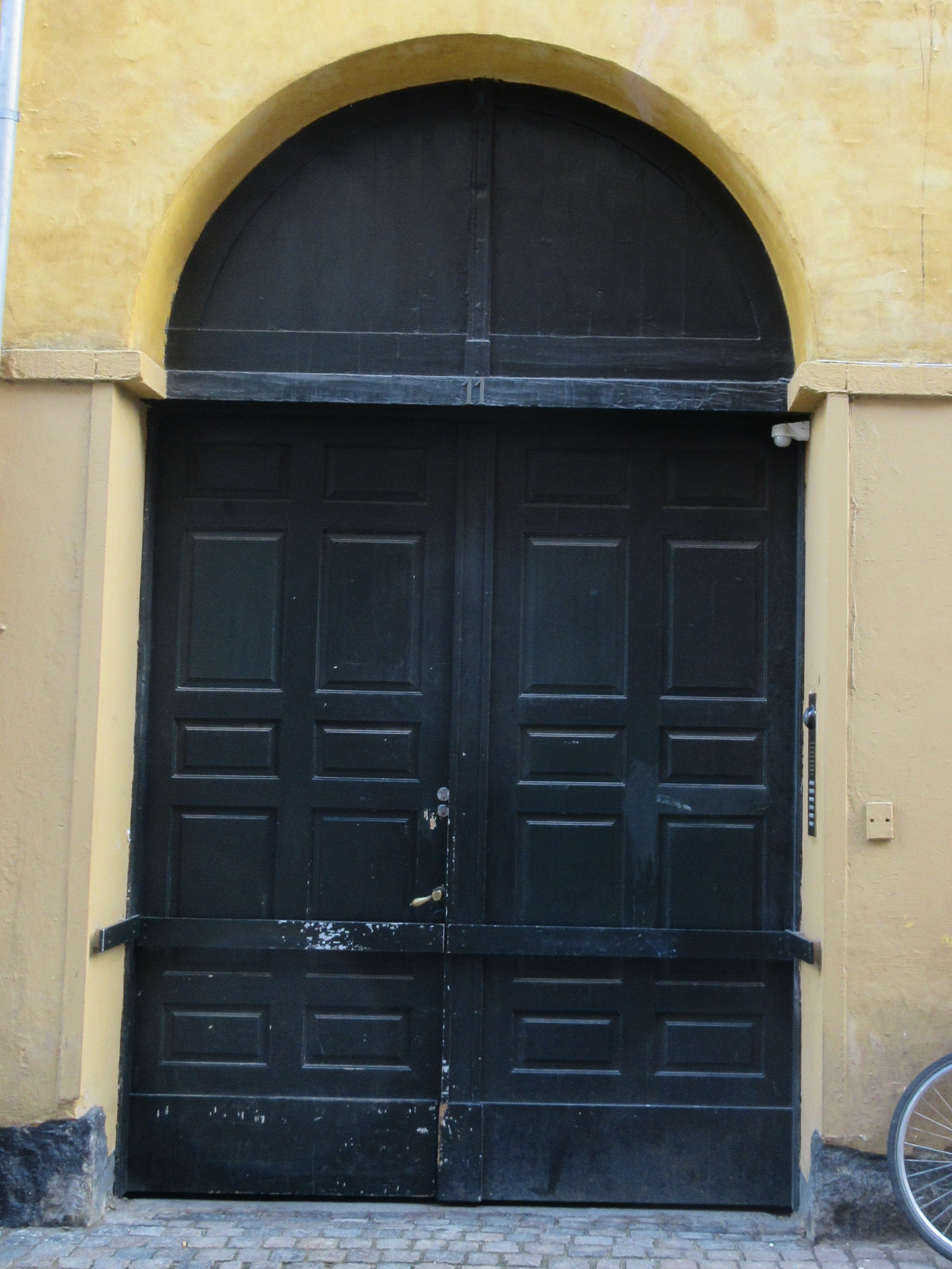
The gate of Magstræde 11
