= Magens =

Magens is a surname. Notable people with this surname include:

- Joachim Melchior Magens (colonial administrator) (1715–1783), Danish colonial administrator and planter
- Joachim Melchior Magens (jurist) (1775–1845), Danish jurist, grandson of the above
- Magens Dorrien Magens (ca 1762–1849), English banker and politician
- Nicholas Magens (1697 or 1704–1764), attorney and merchant from Holstein

== See also ==
- Magen
- Magens Bay, US Virgin Islands
