= Joachim Melchior Magens =

Joachim Melchior Magens may refer to:

- Joachim Melchior Magens (colonial administrator) (1715–1783), Danish colonial administrator and planter
- Joachim Melchior Magens (jurist) (1775–1845), Danish jurist, grandson of the above
