= Magens Bay =

Bay in the Northside region on Saint Thomas, United States Virgin Islands

Magens Bay Beach
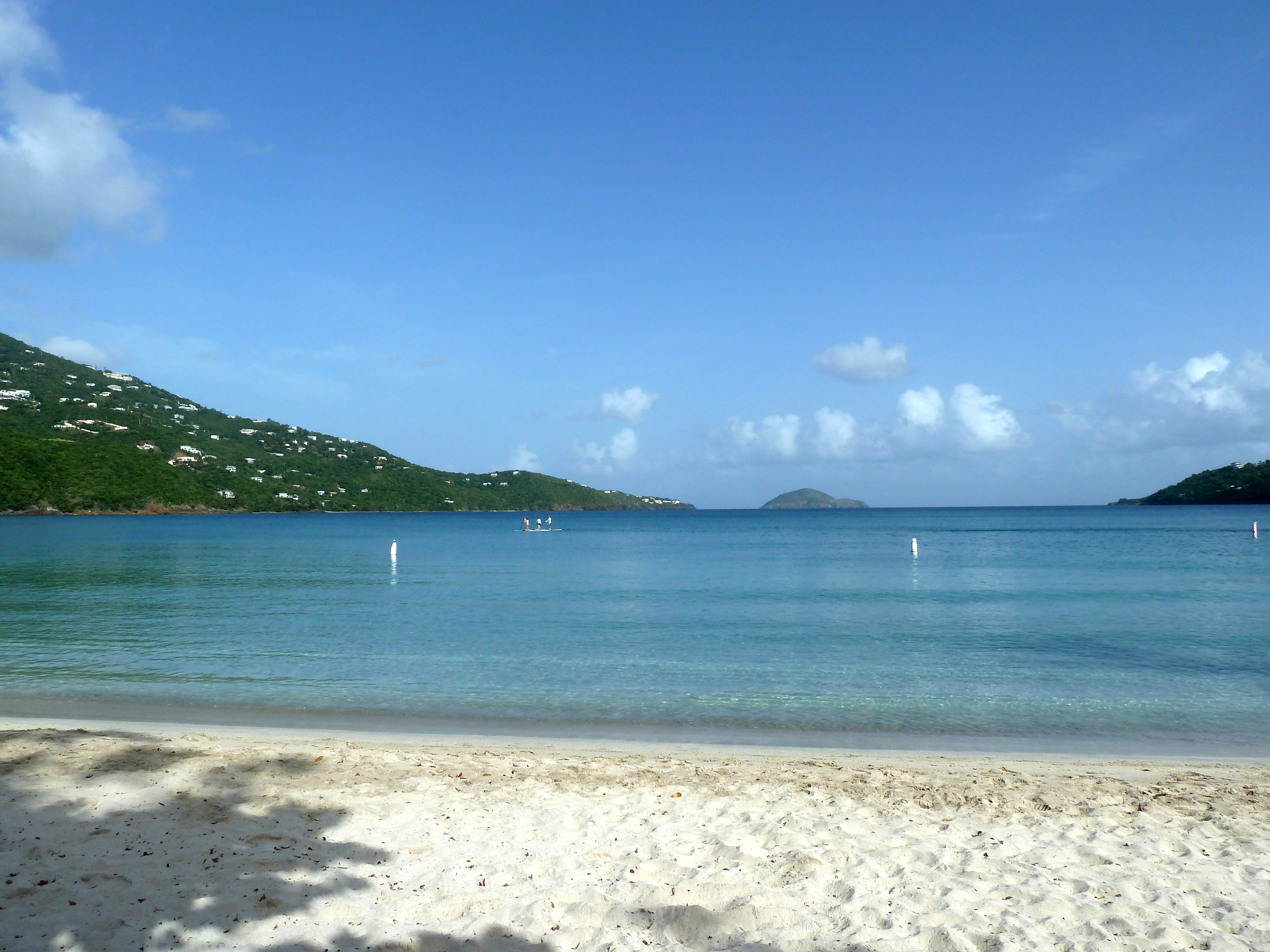
- View of Magens Bay
- Interactive map of Magens Bay Beach
- Location: Saint Thomas
- Nearest city: Charlotte Amalie
- Coordinates: 18.366°N 64.930°W
- Operator: Magens Bay Authority
- Status: Open all year
- Designation: Public park

Magens Bay is a bay and beach park in the Northside region on Saint Thomas, United States Virgin Islands, in the Caribbean.

== Description ==
Lying on the northern (Atlantic) side of the island, Magens Bay (Estate Zufriedenheit) features a well-protected white sand beach stretching for nearly three-quarters of a mile. The beach sits at the head of a deep bay, the arms of which are Peterborg peninsula to the east and Tropaco Point to the west. The bay's north-west exposure means its waters are usually calm, although storms in the North Atlantic can occasionally generate large waves in the winter months. The sandy bottom means snorkeling is of limited interest, although turtles, stingrays, spotted eagle rays, conch, tarpon and other fish are commonly spotted.

It is one of the most popular tourist destinations on the island, as well as a gathering place for locals, attracting 300,000 visitors per year. Small local fishing boats anchor in the eastern part of the bay.

The beach and surrounding park are currently administered by the semi-autonomous Magens Bay Authority. The services provided by the Authority include lifeguards, parking, showers and bathrooms, beach sheds, beach wheelchairs, and a fitness trail. There is a snack counter, bar and souvenir shop. Beach chairs, floats, lounge chairs, masks and snorkels, fins, towels, paddleboards, kayaks, and paddleboats can be rented. The Authority is a self-sustaining entity which funds its operations through a per-person entrance fee (currently $7.00 for visitors and $2.00 for locals, free for kids under 12), parking fees, and payments received from the park's restaurant and other rental concessions. The beach property also includes a coconut grove, a mangrove, and an arboretum.

== Environment ==
=== Nature Trail ===
In 2004, The Nature Conservancy and local organizations opened a trail to Magens Bay from a spot off the road in the hills above. It belongs to a 319 acre preserve overseen by The Nature Conservancy, Magens Bay Authority and VI Department of Planning & Nature Resources. 25 of its acres were exclusively donated for this trail. On the trail it is possible to see many different bird species of the preserve, passing through different ecosystems from the top of the hill down 1½ miles to Magens Bay.

=== Important Bird Area ===
A 572 ha area, encompassing the bay, beach, mangroves and associated protected forests, has been recognised as an Important Bird Area (IBA) by BirdLife International because it supports populations of green-throated caribs, Antillean crested hummingbirds, Caribbean elaenias and pearly-eyed thrashers.

== History ==
Magens Bay was settled by Amerindians, and pre-Columbian artifacts have been discovered there, including a "ritual spatula" or "swallow stick" that is believed to have been made from the rib of a manatee by the Taíno people sometime between 1200 and 1500.

Legend has it that Sir Francis Drake used Magens Bay as an anchorage while waiting for ships to plunder.

Early maps of St. Thomas refer to the site as "Great Northside Bay". The popular name, "Magens Bay", arose out of its ownership from 1817-1898 by Arve Petersen Magens and his heirs (the same family as Joachim Melchior Magens (1715–1783) and Joachim Melchior Magens (1775–1845)). In 1916 it was acquired by Wall Street financier Arthur S. Fairchild, who then donated 56 acres of the beach and surrounding areas to the Municipality of St. Thomas and St. John in 1946 for use as a public park.

Fairchild's donation was with the stated intention that "the natural beauty and benefits to be preserved for the enjoyment of the inhabitants of the Virgin Islands without discrimination of any kind by reason of race, color or creed," and his conditions for donating the land included: 1) a hotel/resort cannot be built on this property, 2) a casino can never be built on this property and 3) the beach should be named Magens Beach. The far Western portion was subsequently donated by Fairchild's nephew's widow, Christine Wheaton, in 2002.

== In popular culture ==
Several commercials and movie scenes have been filmed at Magens Bay, including a scene in The Twilight Saga: Breaking Dawn – Part 1 and parts of Weekend at Bernie's II.

== Gallery ==
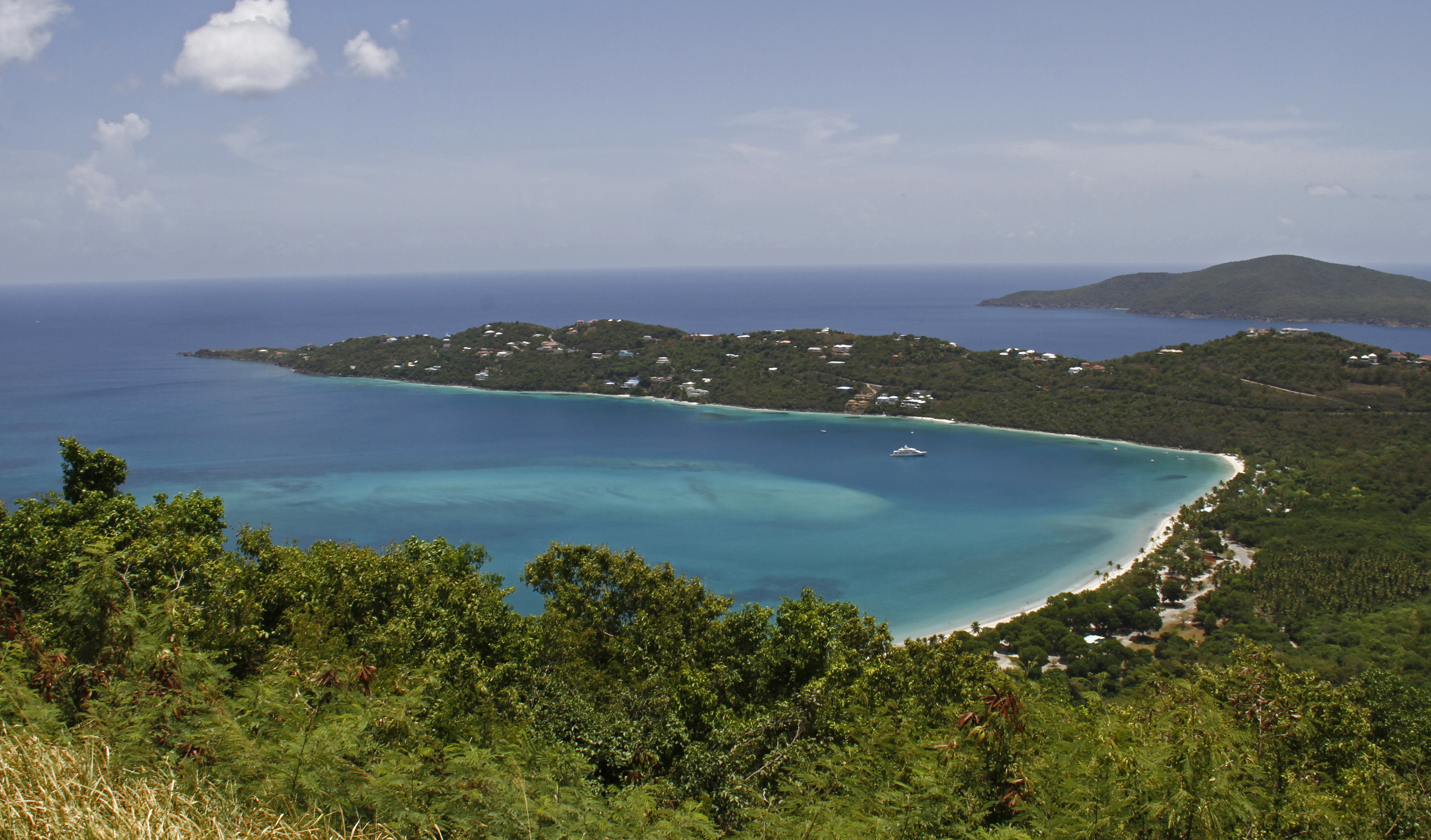
View of Magens Bay from Drake's Seat overlook

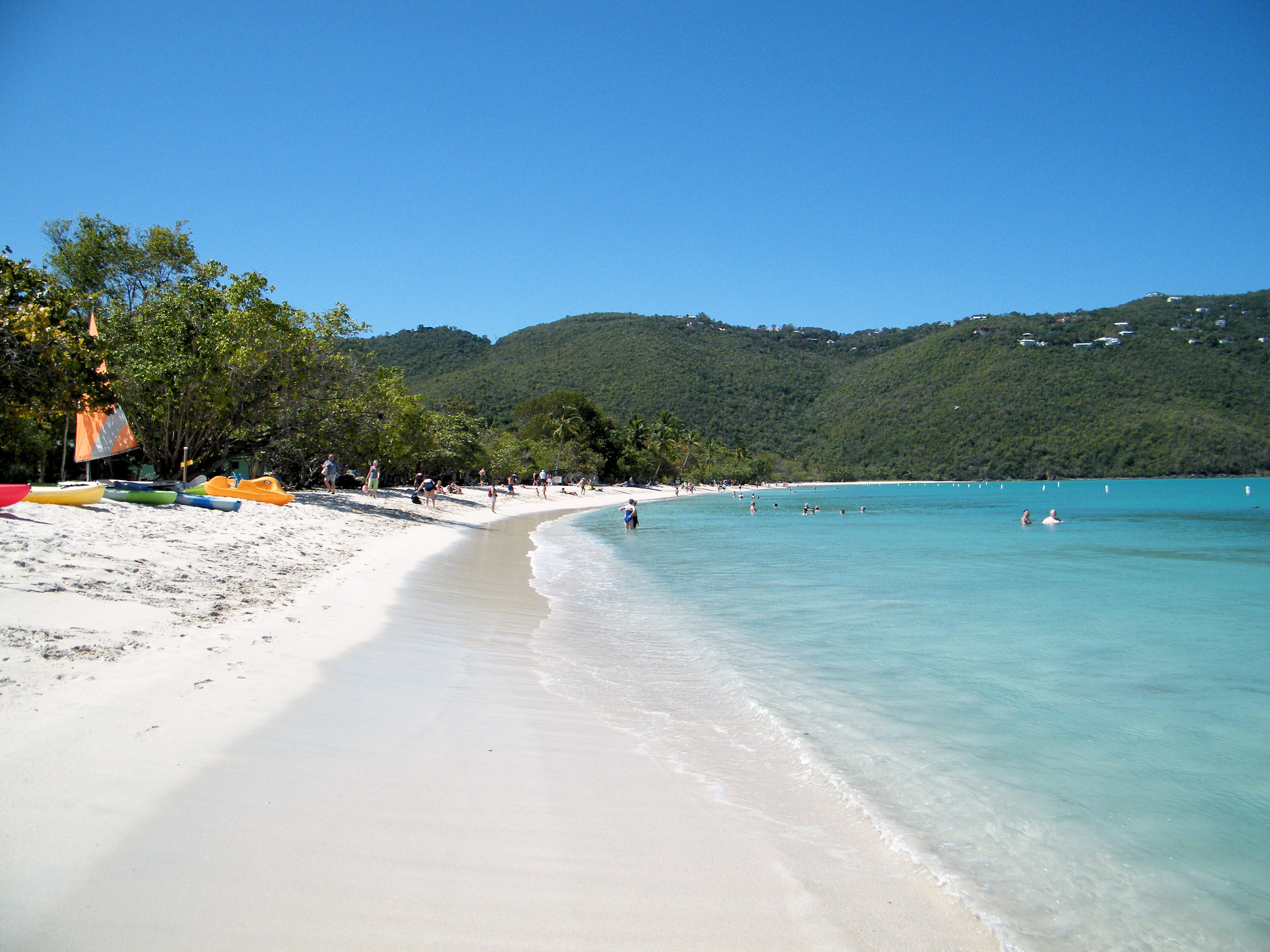
View from Magens Bay, facing Tropaco Point

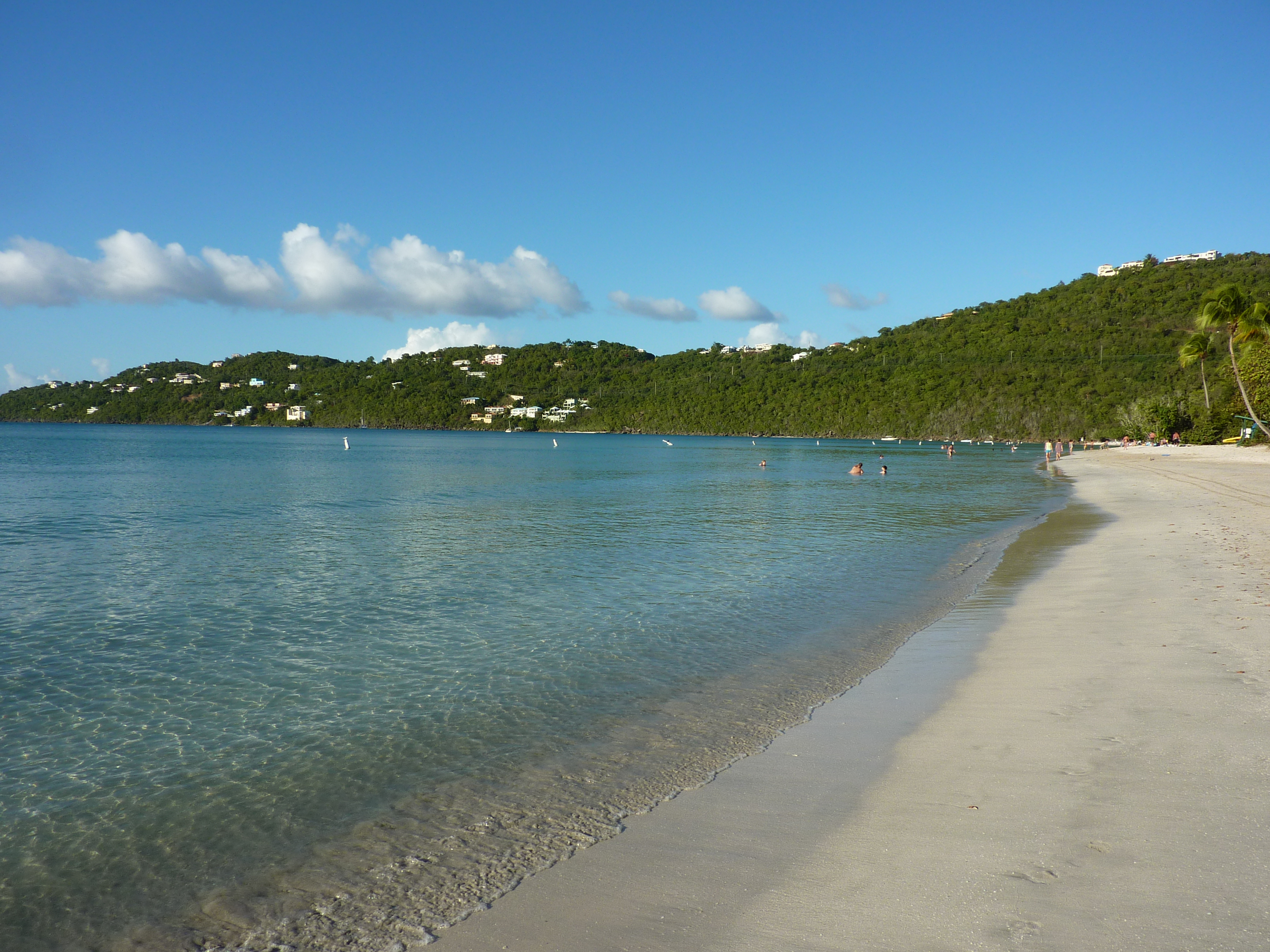
View from Magens Bay, facing Peterborg Point

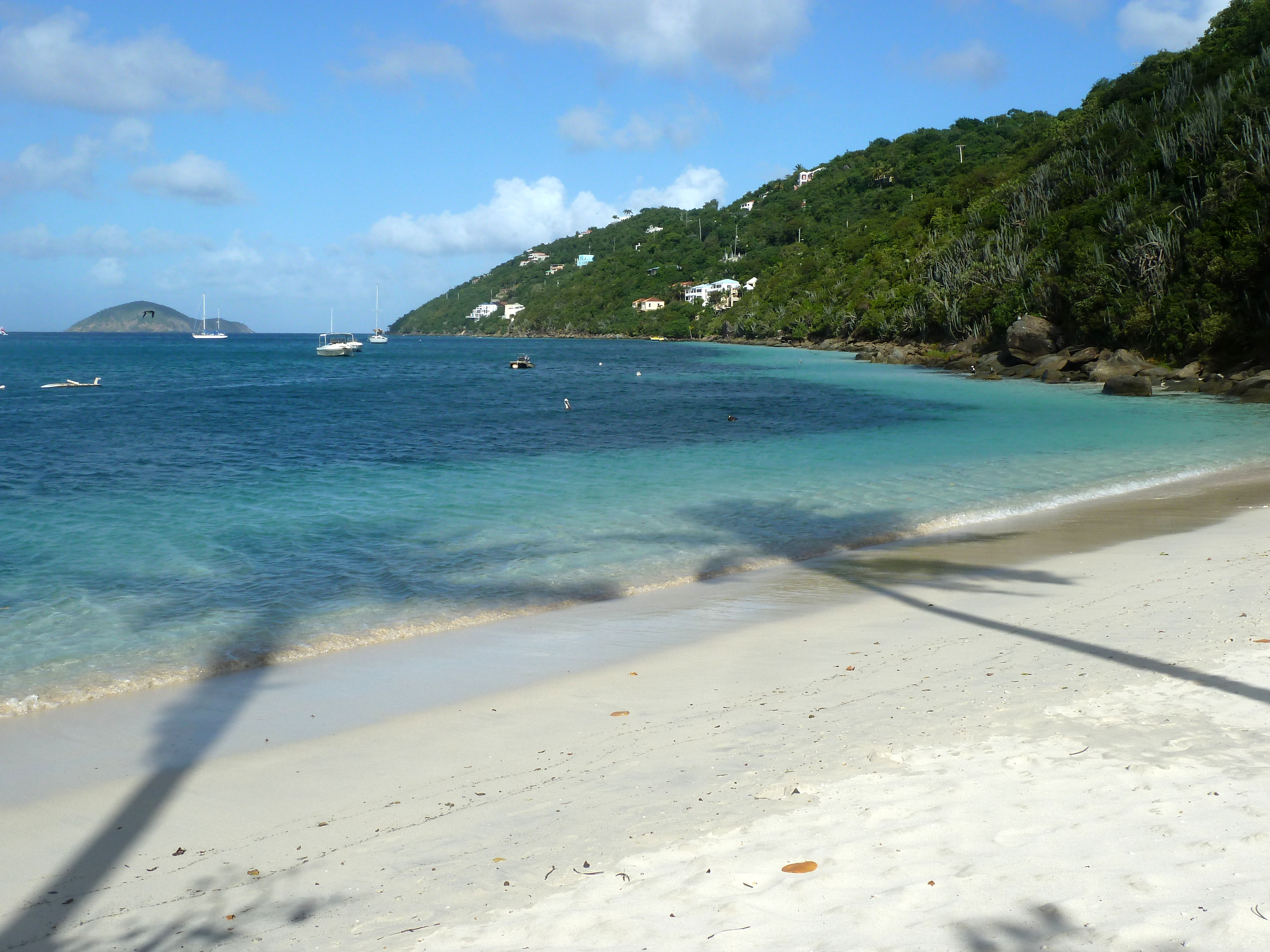
Palm tree shadows at Magens

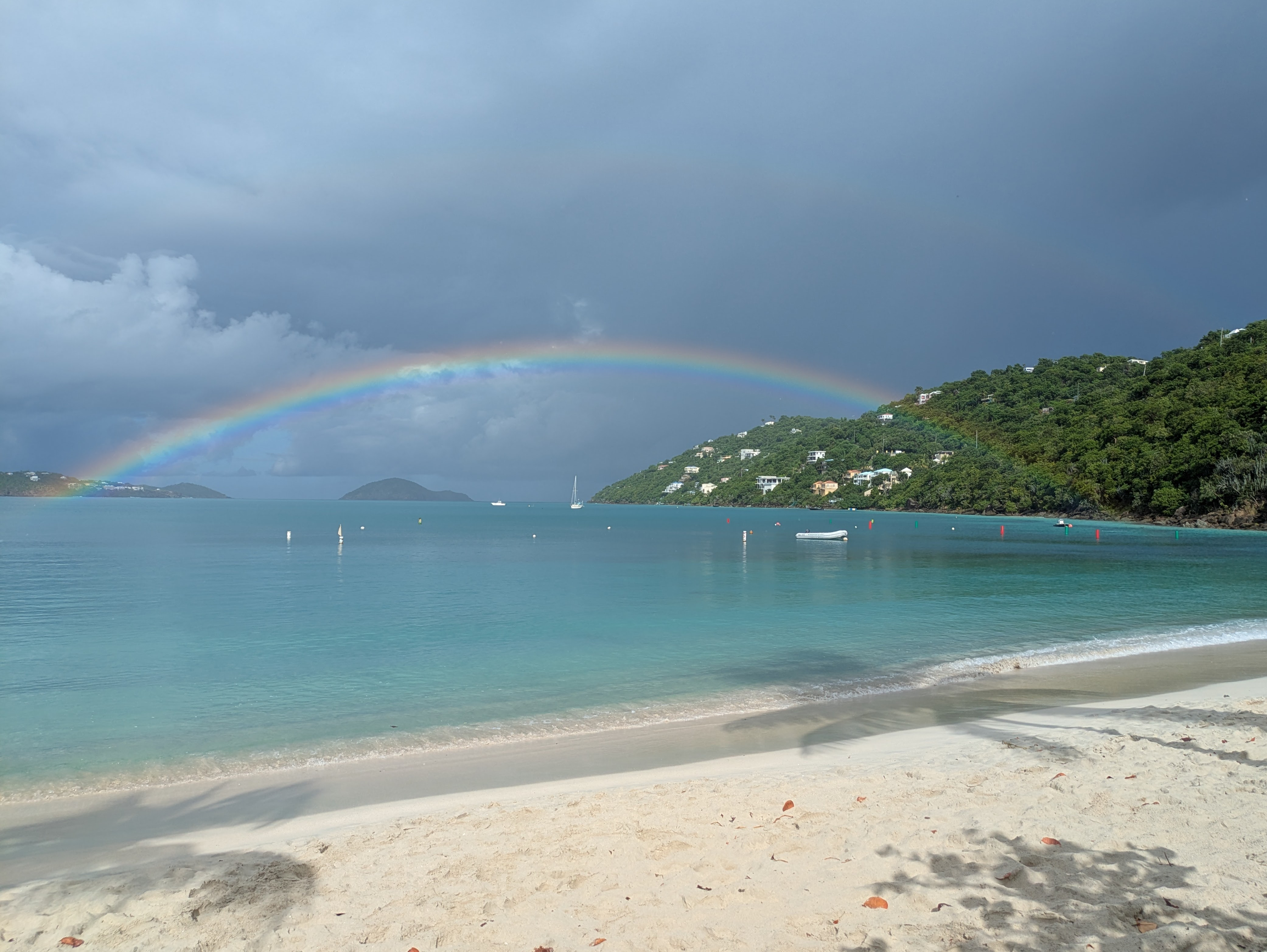
Rainbow at Magens
