= Rådhusstræde 6 =

Listed building in Copenhagen

Kompagnistræde 21
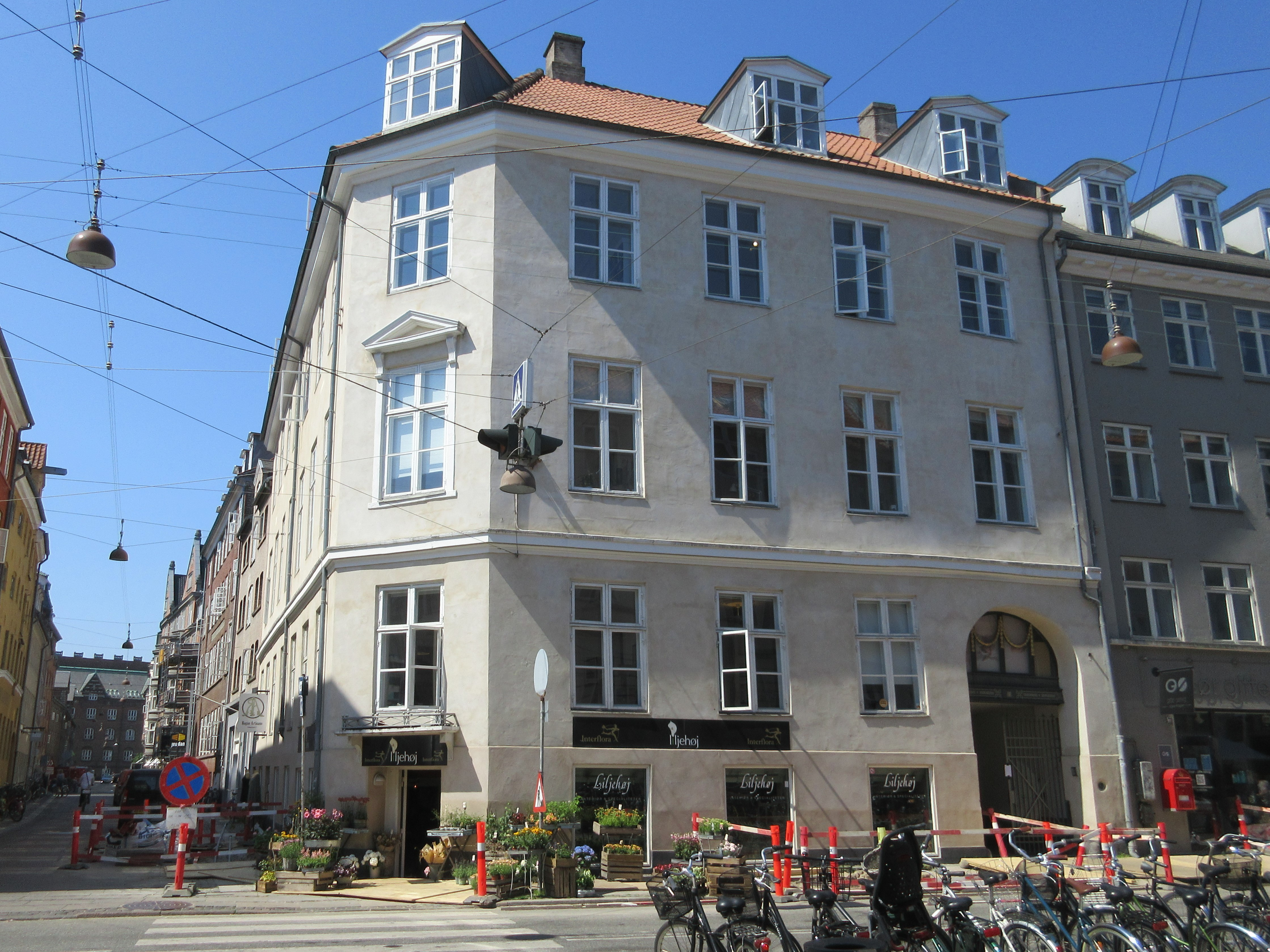
- Interactive map of the Kompagnistræde 21 area

General information
- Location: Copenhagen, Denmark
- Coordinates: 55°40′36.16″N 12°34′26.87″E
- Completed: 1797
- Client: Danish Union of Teachers

Design and construction
- Architect: Andreas Hallander

Rådhusstræde 6 is a Neoclassical property situated at the corner of Rådhusstræde and Kompagnistræde, between Gammeltorv-Nytorv and Gammel Strand, in the Old Town of Copenhagen, Denmark. It was constructed by Andreas Hallander, one of the most active master builders in the rebuilding of the city following the Copenhagen Fire of 1795. The building was listed in the Danish registry of protected buildings and places in 1964. Notable former residents include the politicians Johan Nicolai Madvig and J.A. Hansen. Later acquired by the Danish Union of Teachers, it housed the Danish School Museum from 1995 to 2008.

== History ==
=== 18th century ===
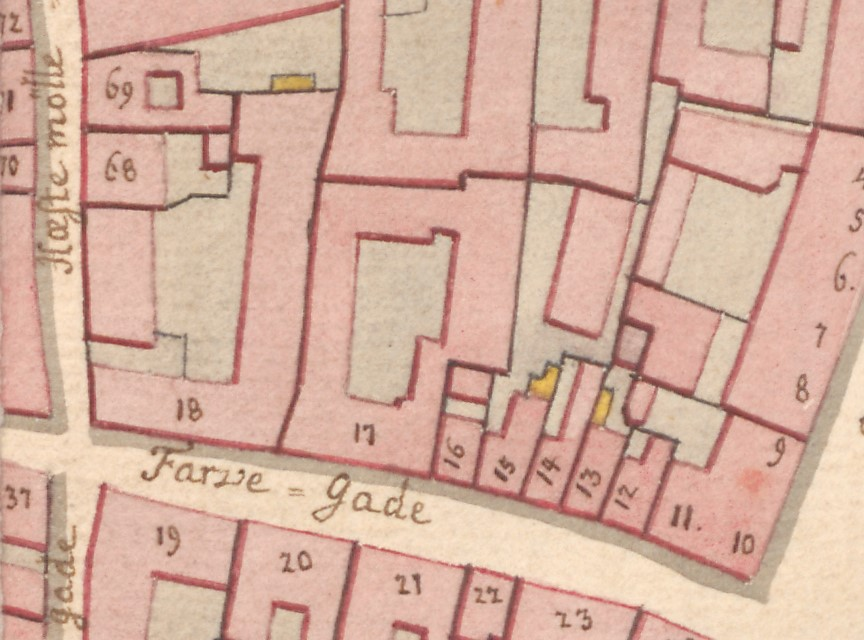
No. 16 and No. 17 seen in a detail from Christian Gedde's map of Copenhagen's West Quarter, 1757

The site was in the late 17th century made up of six very small properties. They were listed as No. 10–16 in the city's West Quarter (Vester Kvarter) in Copenhagen's first cadastre of 1689. The owners included a brewer, a skipper, a fisherman and a constable.

The buildings on the site were destroyed in the Copenhagen Fire of 1728 and again by another fire in October 1749. A strip of the properties were subsequently used for a widening of the street.

The seven properties were again listed as No. 10–16 in the cadastre of 1756. The owners at that time were a renteskriver (two properties), a master craftsman at Orlogsværftet (two properties), a building painter, a distiller and a shoemaker.

The buildings were all destroyed in the Copenhagen Fire of 1795. The fire sites were subsequently merged into a single property. The current building on the site was constructed by Andreas Hallander in 1797. He was one of the most active master builders in the rebuilding of the city after the fire.

=== The Magens family ===
The new property was sold to Johannes Magens (1745–1801), a former bookkeeper and customs officer ('kontrollør, taksatør, visitator samd vejermester) on Saint John in the Danish West Indies.

At the time of the 1801 census, Magens' property was home to just two households. Magens resided in the building with his wife Else Margaretha Magens (née Schmidt), their four children (aged seven to 21), the son Joachim Melchior Magens from his first marriage (1715 - 1783, jurist), a housekeeper, a female cook, a coachman, two black seamstresses (aged 16 and 19) and three male servants (aged 12 to 18, one of them black). Ana Maria Dorothea Traboe, a countess, resided in another apartment with two maids, the 34-year-old merchant (urtekræmmer) Hans Adolph Høeg, a housekeeper and three of Høeg's employees.

Johannes Magens died on 19 May 1801. He is buried at Assistens Cemetery. Else Margrethe Magens kept the property after her husband's death. It was listed as No. 120 in the new cadastre of 1806. It was at that time still owned by her.

The daughter Jacobine Severine Magens (1786–1812) was married to Caspar Holten Grevencop-Castenschiold (1780–1954), owner of Hørbygaard and Store Frederikslund. Her elder half-sister, Petronella (1778-), who had stayed on Saint Thomas, was married to George Brown (1773–1818), son of John Brown. Her brother Joachim Melchior Magens (1775–1845) was married to their daughter Petronelle Cathrine Brown (1814-).

=== Josva From and his tenants ===
The property was later acquired by merchant (urtekræmmer, later agent) Josva From. He was originally from Øster Skerninge on Funen. He had been admitted to the Royal Copenhagen Shooting Society in 1815. He and his wife Karen resided in the apartment on the first floor. They had no children but younger family members on both sides were often part of their household. In 1840, it was the nieces Laurentze Black (aged 32) and Caroline From (aged 29). In 1845, it was Caroline From and her two years younger brother Hans Josva From.

Jacob Thostrup Hansen, another merchant (urtekræmmer), who was married to another relative, Christiane Hansen (née Black), resided on the ground floor (1840, 1945 and 1850). In 1840 their household also comprised the wife's sister Marie Black, six employees in the family's trading business, two male servants and two maids.

Lauritz Jacob Fribert (1808–1886), recently appointed as secretary (archivist) of the University of Copenhagen board of directors (Universitets-Direktion), was a tenant on the second floor in 1840. He lived there with his wife Marie Luice Fribert (née Eglardi), a housekeeper and a maid. Fribert would later (in January 1855) emigrate to America, settling as a lawyer in Dodge County, Wisconsin. By 1845 the second floor apartment had been taken over by kammerråd and later justitsråd hristian Frederik Lund (1780–1852), He lived there with his wife Inger Cathrine Kund (née Madsen), their six children (aged 15 to 27), the wife's 15-year-old nephew and two maids. By 1850 the second floor apartment was occupied by Inger Luise Classen, a 59-year-old widow, who lived there with her 26-year-old niece Martha Natalia Luise Arnholz, a housekeeper (husjomfru), a maid and two lodgers.

Josva From was also the owner of a country house in Taarbæk. In 1862, he purchased a new property at Amaliegade 13. The property and associated business in Rådhusstræde was after that taken over by Fritz Saabye. One of the six employees resident on the ground floor at the 1840 census, he had already worked for the firm at the 1840 census (as part of Jacob Hansen's household) and had later married the niece Ane Marie Kirstine Blacks.

=== Later history ===
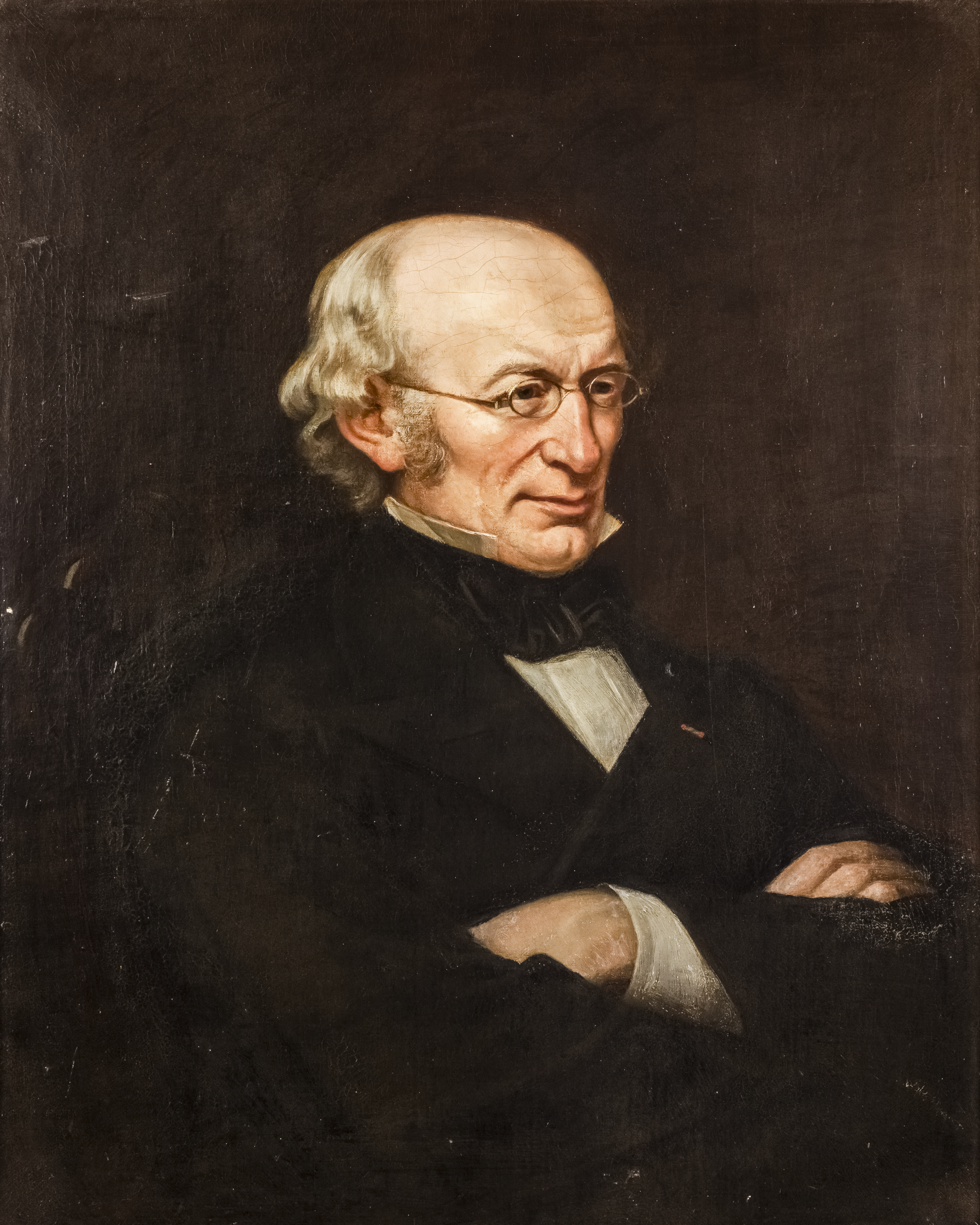
Johan Nicolai Madvig

When house numbering was introduced in Copenhagen in 1859, as a supplement to the old cadastral numbers by quarter, No. 120 was listed as Rådhusstræde 6.

At the time of the 1860 census, Rådhusstræde 6 was home to a total of 17 residents in three households. Anna Helene Tack, widow of a merchant (grosserer), resided on the ground floor with her 40-year-old daughter Andrea Cathrine Marie Tack, a housekeeper (husjomfru) and two maids. Frederik Herman Rostgaard von der Maase (1800–1866), a chamberlain, resided in one of the apartments with his wife Olivia van Ddr Maase (daughter of Christian Colbjørnsen), a chamber maid, a maid, a female cook and a male servant. Johan Nicolai Madvig, a philologist and Kultus Minister, resided in the third apartment with his wife Elisabeth Agathe Helene Jensine Madvig, their three children (aged 26 to 29) and two maids.

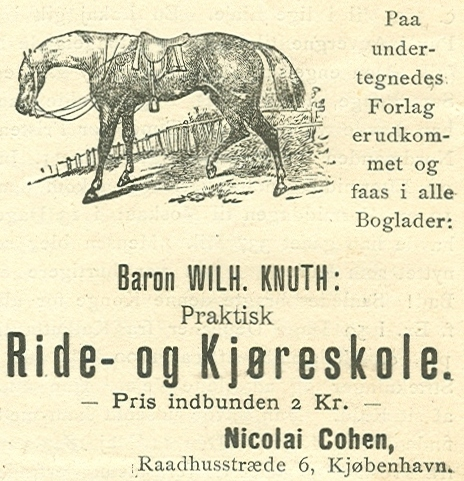
Advert for Wilhelm Knutgh's riding and driving school, Illustreret Tidende No. 38, 10 June 1887

J.A. Hansen (1806–1877), later a politician, was a resident of the building in 1868–69.

At the time of the 1880 census, Rådhusstræde 6 was home to 32 residents in five households. Lars Christian Frederik Andersen, a merchant (grosserer), resided on the ground floor with his wife Cecilie Andersen, their three children (aged 16 to 22), two male employees and a maid. Harry Hertz, a banker/broker, resided on the first floor with his wife Dina Hertz, their four children (aged 10 to 15), a housekeeper (husjomfru) and a maid. Sophie Melchior (née Bloch, 1824–1905), widow of Nathan Gerson Melchior (son of Gerson Moses Melchior (1771–1845)), resided on the second floor with four of her children (aged 19 to 32) and two maids. Rudolph Foght, a merchant (urtekræmmer), resided in the garret with his wife Jutta Foght, their three children (aged eight to 18), a maid and a lodger. Theodor August Thorlund and Viktor Emanuel Rasmussen (aged 17 and 19). two floor clerks, resided in the basement.

In the late 1880s, Baron Wilhelm Knuth ran a combined riding and driving school from the building. It was managed by Nicolai Cohen.

The building was in the second half of the 20th century acquired by the Danish Union of Teachers. The Danish School Museum was from 1995 to 2008 based in the building.

== Architecture ==
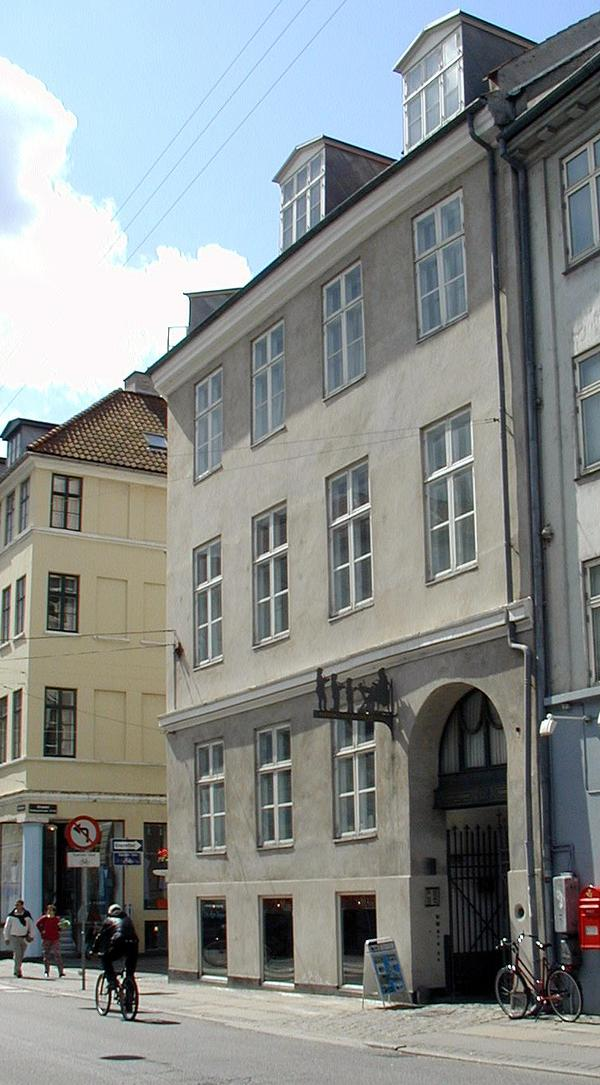
The building seen from Rådhusstræde

The building is constructed with three storeys over a walk-out basement, with a four-bays-long facade on Rådhusstræde and a seven-bays-long facade on Kompagnistræde. The chamfered corner bay was dictated for all corner buildings by Jørgen Henrich Rawert's and Peter Meyn's guidelines for the rebuilding of the city after the fire so that the fire department's long ladder companies could navigate the streets more easily. The plastered and grey-painted facade is finished with a robust white-painted belt course above the ground floor and a white-painted cornice. The corner window on the first floor is topped by a triangular pediment. A gateway, with a lunette window with gilded festoon decorations, is located in the bay farthest to the right in Rådhusstræde. The basement entrance in the corner bay is topped by a hood mould supported by corbels. The building shares a cobbled courtyard with the properties at Kompagnistræde 30-32 and Rådhusstræde 4. The red tile roof features 10 dormer windows towards the street and four towards the yard. The roof ridge is pierced by four chimneys, two of which are located at the gables.

== Today ==
The building is still owned by the Danish Union of Teachers. It is let out as office space.
