= Magen =

Magen (Hebrew: מָגֵן, lit. Shield) may refer to:

== People ==
- Aliza Magen-Halevi (1937–2025), Israeli intelligence officer
- David Magen (born 1945), former Israeli politician
- Mira Magen (born 1950), Israeli author
- Zvi Magen (born 1945), Israeli ambassador

== Other uses ==
- Magen, Israel, a kibbutz in southern Israel
- MAGEN (security), a technology that prevents certain data from being displayed to unauthorized people

== See also ==
- Magens
- Magen David Adom, Israel's emergency medical, disaster, ambulance and blood bank service
- HaMagen, a Jewish defense organization active during World War I
- Star of David, known in Hebrew as the Magen David
