= Joachim Melchior Magens (colonial administrator) =

Danish colonial administrator and planter (1715–1783)

Joachim (Jockum) Melchior Magens (4 March 1715 – 18 August 1783) was a Danish colonial administrator and planter in the Danish West Indies. He is remembered for publishing a grammar of Negerhollands in 1770. Magens Bay is named after his father. He was the grandfather of Joachim Melchior Magens (1775–1845).

== Early life and background ==
Magens was born on St. Thomas in the Danish West Indies, the son of planter Jacob Jørgensen Magens (1682–1731) and Maria van Beverhoudt (1675–1718).

== Career ==
Magens and a Copenhagen-based younger brother inherited plantation No. 7 on St. John. He later served first as skifteforvalter on St. Thomas (1760) and then as bailiff (landfoged) and council chairman (stadshauptmand) on the island.

== Written works ==
Magens published a grammar of Negerhollands entitled Grammatica over det Creolske Sprog, som bruges paa de trende Danske Eilande, St. Croix, St. Thomas og St. Jans i America (1770).

Magens also translated The Articles of Faith of the Holy Evangelical Church According to the Word of God and the Augsburg Confession as Set Forth in Forty Sermons, originally written by 17th century Danish theologian Petrus Sachariae Nakskow, into English in 1754 for the benefit of local Lutheran clergy and laity while he lived in New York City.
