= Joachim Melchior Magens (jurist) =

Danish jurist (1775–1845)

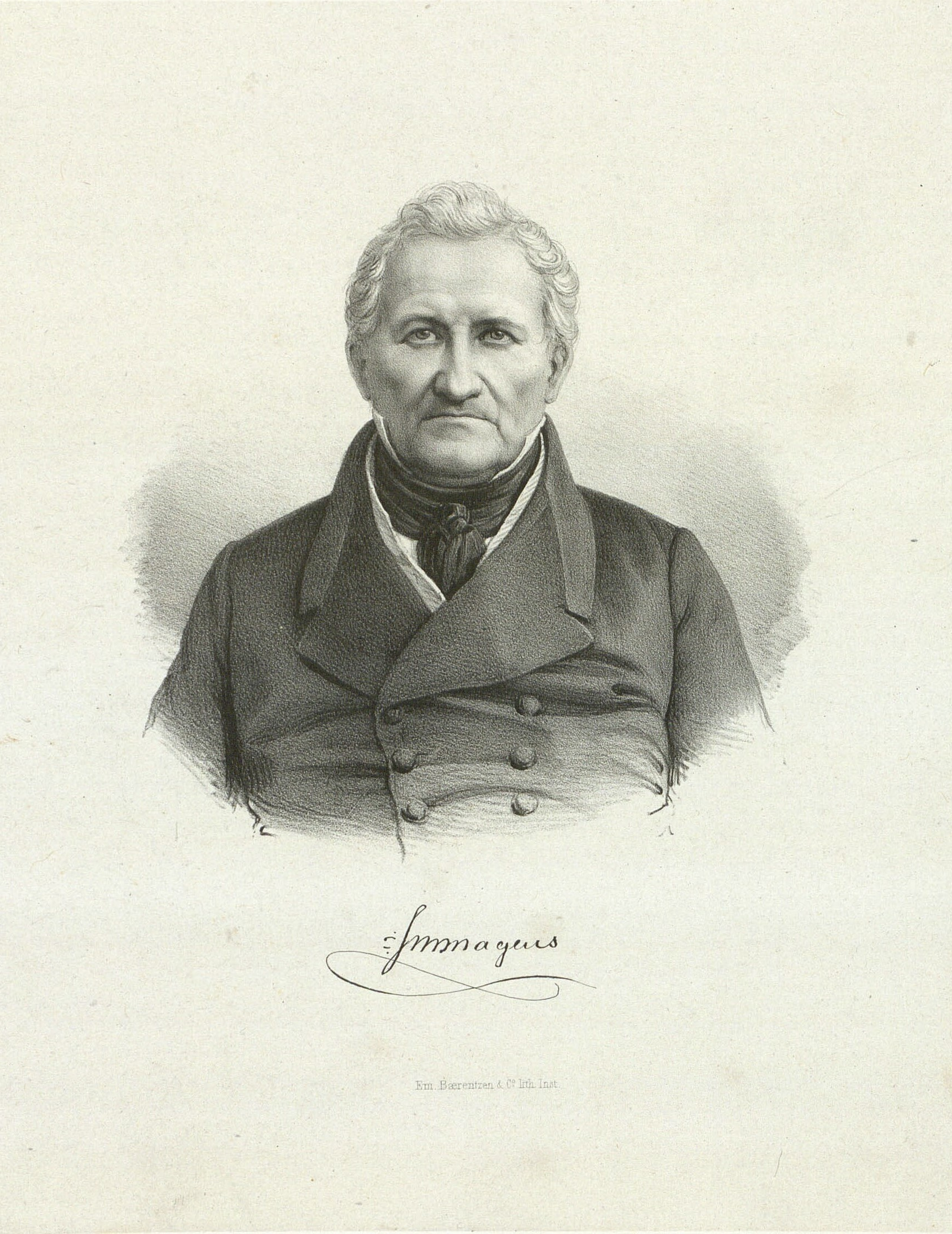
Joachim Melchior Magens.

Joachim Melchior Magens (2 July 1775 – 3 June 1845) was a Danish jurist who served as notarius publicus and public prosecutor in the Danish West Indies. He played a key role in the case against Peter von Scholten. He was the grandson of Joachim Melchior Magens (1715–1783).

== Early life and education ==
Magens was born on St. Thomas in the Danish West Indies on 2 July 1775, the son of Johannes (Johan) Magens (1745–1801) and Anna Helena Hoff. His paternal grandfather was Joachim Melchior Magens. Magens' mother died when he was just a few years old. His father was subsequently married to Else Margrethe Schmidt.. His father worked as bookkeeper and customs officer (kontrollør, taksatør, visitator samd vejermester) on Saint John.

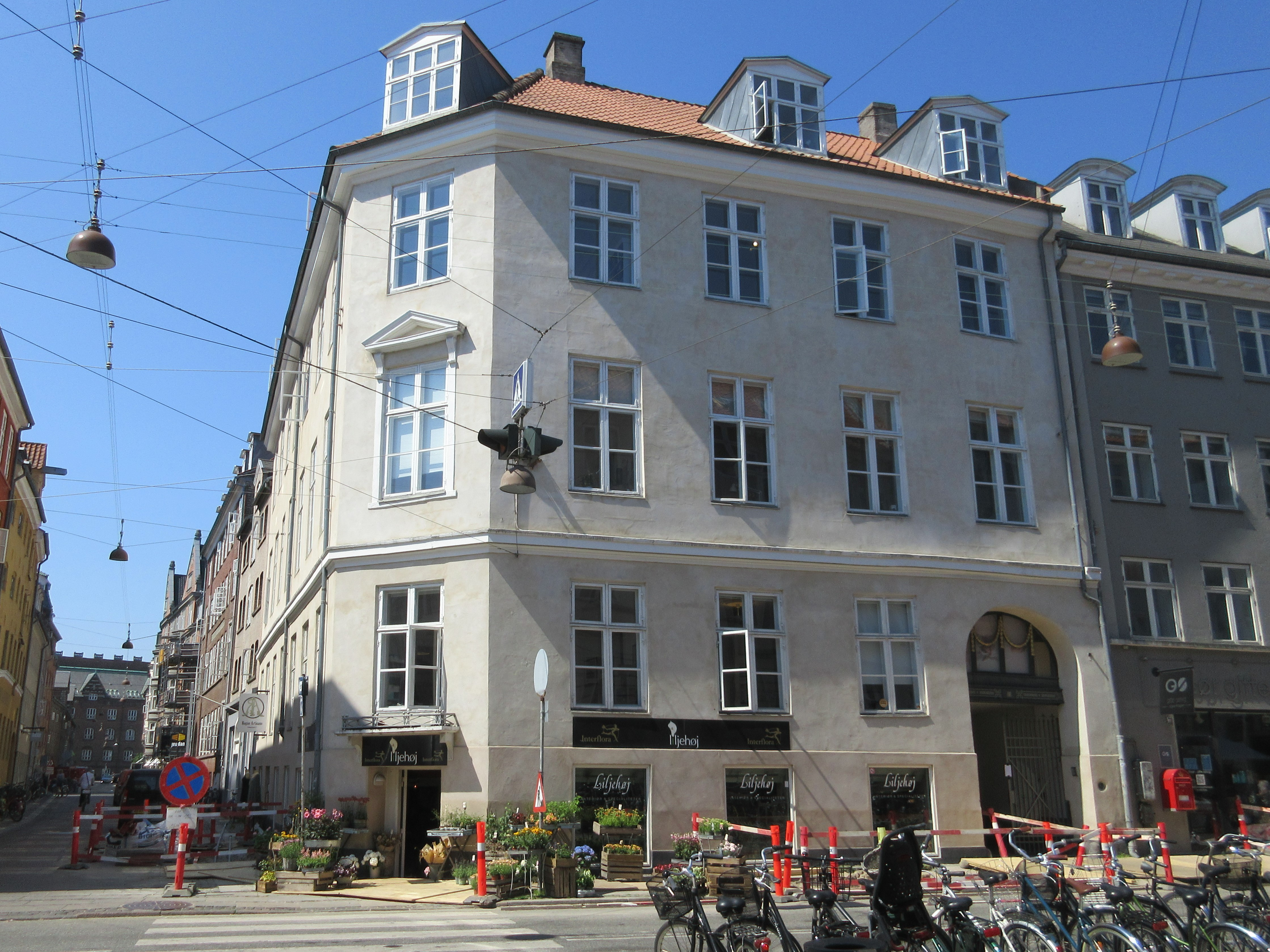
The Magens family's building at Rådhusstræde 6 in Copenhagen.

The family moved to Copenhagen in the 1790s. His father owned the property at Rådhusstræde 6. Magens became exam. juris in 1795. He was still residing in his father's building on Rådhusstræde at the time of the 1801 census. He lived there with his father, stepmother, and four half-siblings. Their staff comprised a housekeeper, a female cook, a coachman, two black seamstresses (aged 16 and 19) and three male servants (aged 12 to 18, one of them black). His father died on 19 May that same year. He is buried at Assistens Cemetery. Else Margrethe Magens kept the property after her husband's death. The property was still owned by Magens' mother in 1806.

Magens' half-sister Jacobine Severine Magens (1786–1812) was married to Caspar Holten Grevencop-Castenschiold (1780–1954), owner of Hørbygaard and Store Frederikslund. Another half-sister, Petronella (1778), who had stayed on Saint Thomas, was married to George Brown (1773–1818), son of John Brown.

== Career ==
Magens would later return to the Danish West Indies, where he initially worked as a lawyer. From 12 February 1817 until 15 October 1825, he served first as captain and then as major in the Civil Militia (Borgermilitsen) on Saint Croix (Ostende Quarter Company). On 1 November 1825, he was appointed as prosecutor (auditør) and advocatus regius on St. Thomas. In 1826, he was appointed as a member of the Royal Council on St. Thomas as royal bookkeeper.

Magens contributed to the rebuilding of the Lutheran church in 1826–27. Pastor Ortved thanked him at the inauguration of the church.

In 1827, he was appointed as head of a commission tasked with the construction of an army barracks in Charlotte Amalia. It was constructed in 1829 on a peninsula south of the fortress. On 9 October 1830, he was appointed as bailiff (landfoged), auction director (auktionsdirektør), notary, skifteforvalter and customs officer (toldskriver) on St. John.

Magens played a key role in the legal proceedings against Governor-General Peter von Scholten. He filed a complaint to the king against Scholten. Together with various other documents related to the case, it was published as Klage til Hans Majestæt Kongen imod Generalgouverneuren over de dansk-vestindiske Øer, Generalmajor etc. von Scholten, indgiven af Magens. Tilligemed forskjellige med Klagen fulgte Bilage og nogle i Anledning af Klagen vexlede Breve. Alt overgivet til Pressen efter Foranstaltning af Generalgouverneur v. Scholten (Copenhagen, 1840; Juridisk Ugeskrift 17 November 1842; Fædrel. III. 1842; Berlingske Tidende, 1842, No. 309). Magens published Proceduren med dertil hørende Actstykker i/ den under 14de November 1842 af Hof- og Stadsretten paakjendte Sag: Generalmajor P. v. Scholten contra Major og Landfoged J. M. Magens. Foranlediget ved Sidstnævntes til Hans Majestæt Kongen, under 9de April 1840 allerunderdanigst indgivne, og senere af Generalgouverneur v. Scholten publicerede Andragende. (Copenhagen, 1843).

== Personal life ==
Magens was married to Maria Rohde (1782–1823). They had five children: Anny Margrethe Magens; Johannes Jürgen Magens; Edward William Magens; Jacobine Elisabeth Magens and Carl Rohde Magens.

In 1830, Magens struggled with increasingly poor health. In July 1830 he travelled to Copenhagen to undergo medical treatment. On 8 May 1831, Doctor Rahlff stated that it was still not wise for him to return to the West Indies. He died on 3 June 1834.
