= Gammel Strand 52 =

Building in Copenhagen, Denmark

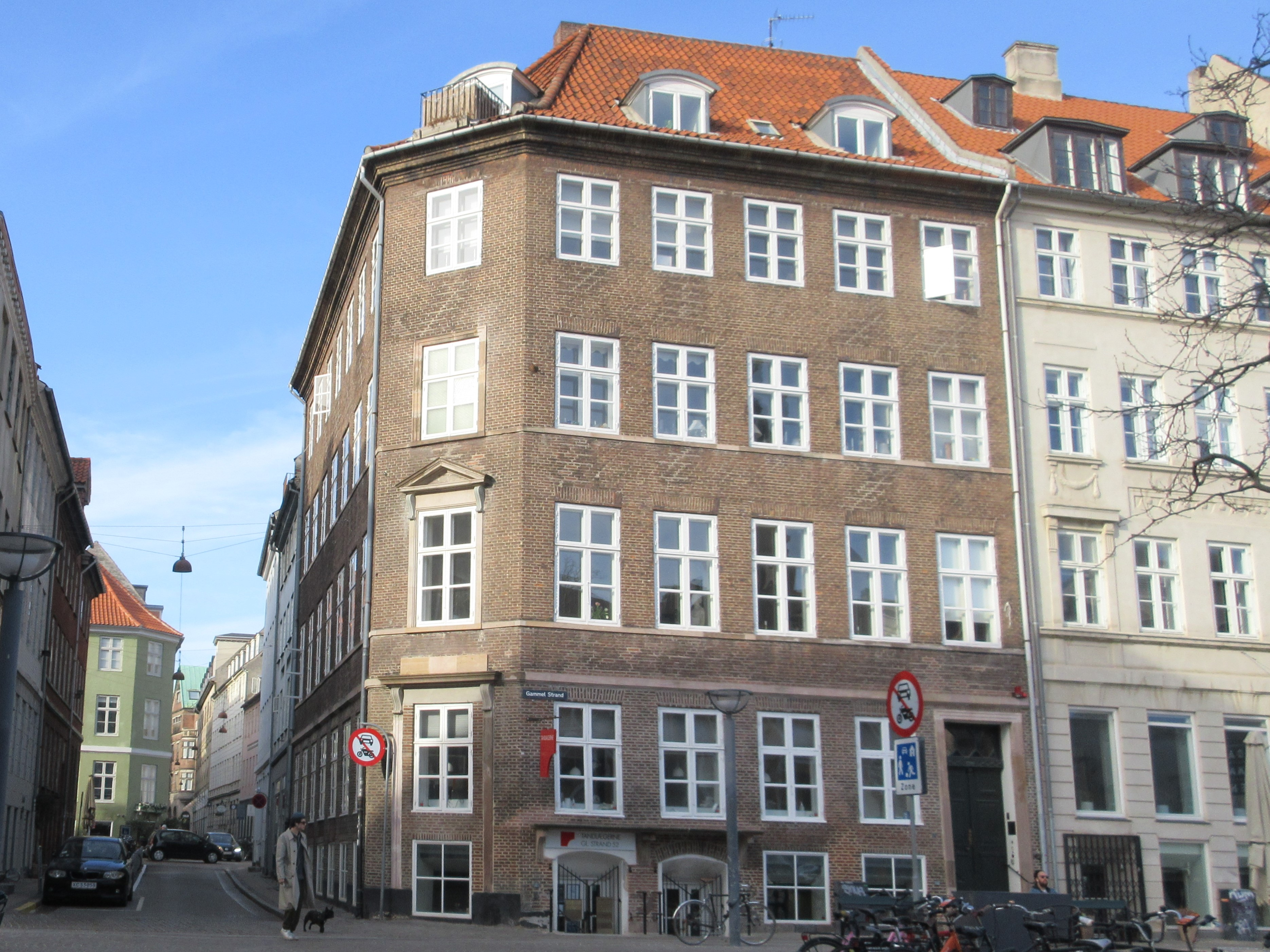
- Interactive map of the Gammel Strand 52 area

General information
- Location: Copenhagen, Denmark
- Coordinates: 55°40′38.86″N 12°34′38.35″E
- Completed: 1798

Design and construction
- Main contractor: Hans Christian Ondrup

Gammel Strand 52/Naboløs 5 is a corner building overlooking Slotsholmens Kanal in central Copenhagen, Denmark. It was listed on the Danish registry of protected buildings and places in 1945.

== History ==
=== Site history, 1500–1795 ===
The entire eastern side of Naboløs (now Naboløs 1–5) was formerly made up of one large property. On 11 October 1504, it belonged to royal guard Peder Kempe. His widow Karina kept the property until her death after 24 July 1542. The property was then passed to their son Roidker Kempe. In 1558, it was acquired by mayor Anders Knudsen Skriver. His widow Sidsel Poulsdatter kept the property after his death in 1579. After her own death in 1611, it passed to their son Christoffer Andersen (died 22 November 1617), a barkeeper and councilman, who was married to Anne Marcusdatter Hess. After her death it was sold to the Crowbn (19 September 1626. On 15 October 1636, it was ceded to Wiwiche Kruse. In April 1648, he transferred it to the son Ulrich Christian Gyldenløve til Ulrichsholm. On 16 December 1649, he ceded the property to Johan Stenkull. By Raadstuedom of 12 December 1670, the property was ceded to Clavs Condevin. After his death, it passed to his heir Hans Johansen. On 30 January 1676, he presented it to councilman and co-owner Bartholomeus Jensen. On 15 March 1677, Bartholomeus Jensen ceded the property to etatsråd Jørgen Elers and his wife Margrete Vandal. Elers is remembered for founding Elers' Kollegium in Store Kannikestræde. Their property was listed in Copenhagen's first cadastre of 1689 as No. 19 in Strand Quarter. After his death on 17 September 1700, it passed to the University of Copenhagen. On 18 June 1707, it was sold to merchant Hans Jørgen Høserich. He owned the property until at least 1728.

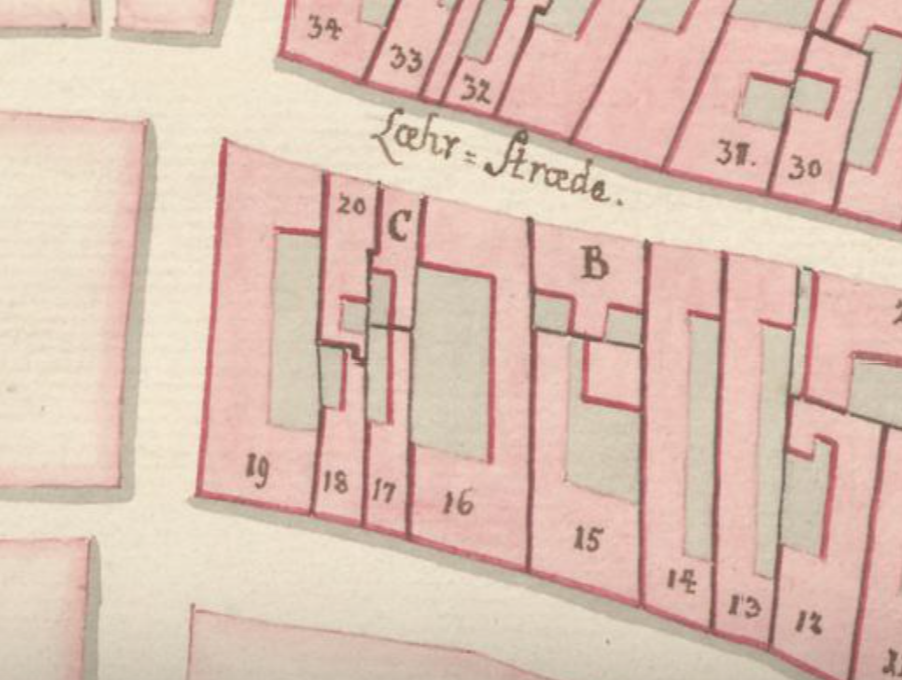
No. 19 seen in a detail from Christian Gedde's map of Strand Quarter, 1756

The property was again listed as No. 19 in the new cadastre of 1756. It was at that time owned by post inspector Peter Bech.

The property was later acquired by wallpaper manufacturer and royal agent Abraham Moses Henriques (1721–1802). In October 1770, one of the apartments was let out to treasurer at Kurantbanken Rasmus Møller. The annual rent was 210 Danish rigsdaler plus a minor contribution to the annual property taxes. Møller and his family lived in the building until the autumn of 1775. They moved after buying a property in Laksegade. Møller was later convicted of embezzlement against the bank.

Abraham Moses Henriques' property was home to 25 residents in five households at the 1787 census. The owner resided in the building with his third wife Sara, their eight-year-old daughter, seven children from his second marriage (aged 13 to 21) and two maids. Johan Frederik Leth (1838–1918), a colonel lieutenant at the Zealand Regiment, resided in the building with his two children (aged five and 18), a male servant and two maids. Cay Hendrich Licht, a captain in the Norwegian Life Regiment, resided in the building with one servant and one maid. Jacob Adler, a junk dealer, resided in the building with his wife Chatrine Marie. Maria Cathrine Tykøv, widow of a gunmaker at the Royal Arsenal, resided in the building with her two daughters (aged 11 and 12).

=== Hans Ondrup and the new building ===
The property was destroyed in the Copenhagen Fire of 1795, together with most of the other buildings in the area. The fire site was acquired by master builder Hans Christian Ondrup (1751-1814). He divided it into three separate properties. The corner building was as No. 16A constructed by him in 1796–97. It was followed by No. 19B (now Naboløs 3 in 1798 and finally No. 19C at the corner with Læderstræde in 1798-99.

The property was listed in the new cadastre of 1806 as No. 16 in Strand Quarter. It was at that time owned by bookdealer G. L. Buch.

=== Drederik Hjort, 1830–1869 ===
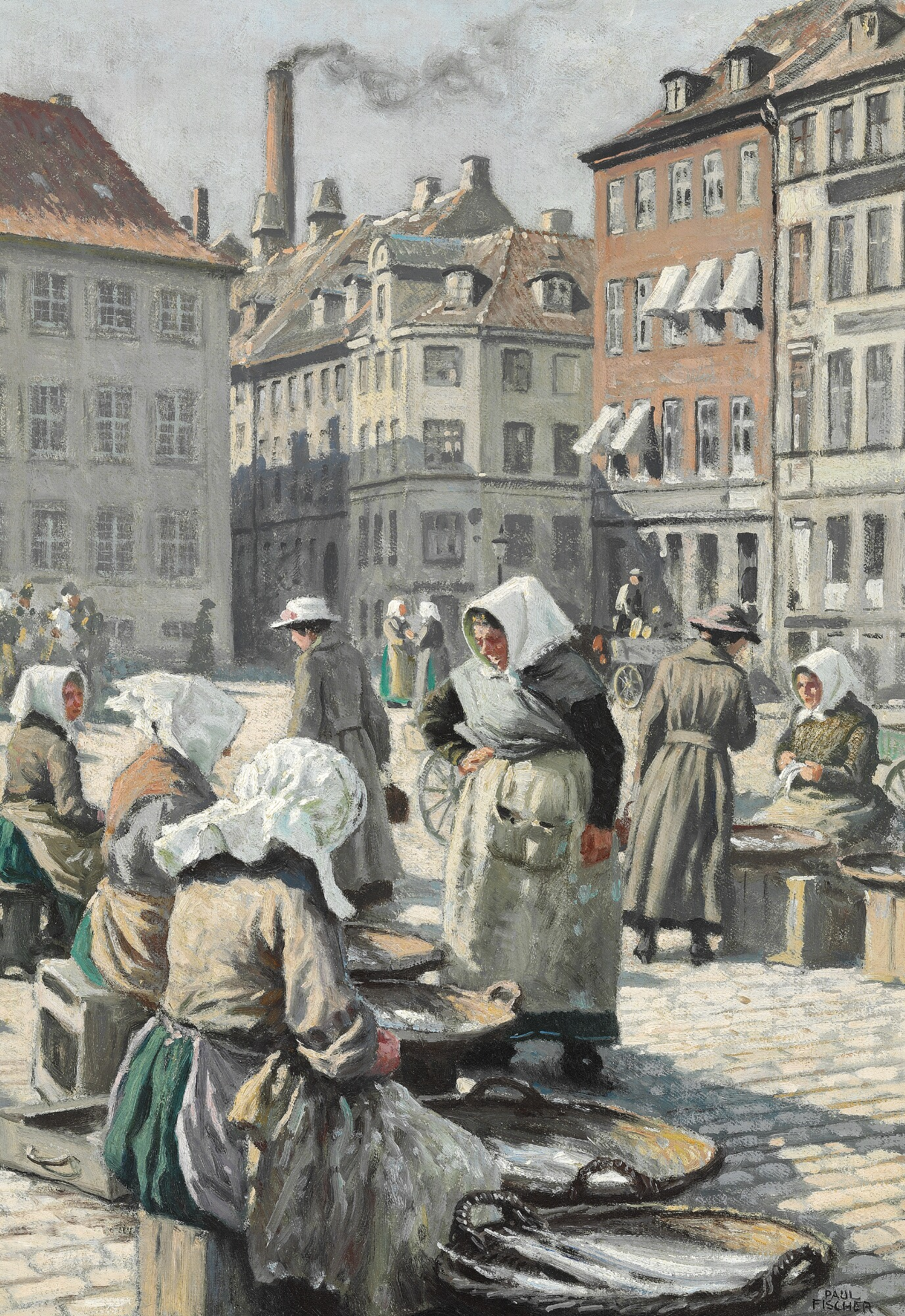
The building seen on the right in a painting by Paul Gustav Fischer

On 27 February 1828 the property was acquired by chancellery secretary Frederik Hjort (1797–1769). In 1830 he was appointed as treasurer of Danske Kancelli, a position in which he remained for 30 years.

Hjort's property was home to six households at the 1840 census. Hans Eskildsen, a restaurateur, resided on the ground floor with his wife Magrethe Lundgaard, one male servant and one maid. Isak Daniel Jacobi, a silk and textile merchant, resided on the first floor with his wife Johanne Jacobi and one maid. Jacob W. Behrens, a broker, resided on the second floor with his wife Jette Behrens, their five children (aged three to 10), a wet nurse and a maid. Christopher Henrik Friederichsen, a regiment surgeon, resided on the third floor with his wife Anne M. Friederichsen, three of their children (aged 27 to 33) and one maid. Peter Hansen Lock, a tailor, resided in the basement with his wife Karen Svensen, their two children (aged two and six) and one maid. Hans Peder Olsen, a sailing master (styrmand), resided in the other half of the basement with his wife Mette Chrestense Olsen, their two children (aged 10 and 14) and one maid.

Frederik Hiort resided in the first-floor apartment at the 1845 census. He lived there with his wife Mette Elisabeth Fenger, their two children (aged nine and 15) and one maid. Justinee Fumars, a widow, resided on the second floor with her sister Pauline Fumars, a maid and two lodgers. Christopher Heinrich and Anne Marie Frederiksen still resided on the third floor with their two children and one maid. Olsen was also still managing the restaurant on the ground floor. Hans Peter Olsen, who was now registered as skipper and barkeeper, resided in one half of the basement with his wife, their two children and a maid. Marie Christine Dall, a widow, resided in the basement to the right with two of her children (aged 25 and 37) and five lodgers.

Hjort's property was again home to six households at the 1850 census. The owner and his two children resided in the first-floor apartment with one maid. Gjort's mother Rachel Hiort (née Gierlof) and brother Johan Edvard Peter Hiort (1788-1863) resided on the ground floor with one maid. Julie Fumari, a widow with a pension, resided on the second floor with her daughter Pouline Fumari, her sister Ane Jensen and two lodgers. Simon Jørgen Wedseltoft (1792-1869). a retired army major, resided on the third floor with his wife Dorthea Elisabeth Friedlieb, their six children (aged four to 20) and one maid. Hans Peter Olsen still resided in one half of the basement with his wife and two of their children. Marie Christine Dahl, a widow, resided in the other half of the basement with a 30-year-old son, a 17-year-old foster daughter and one lodger.

Frederik Hjort owned the building until his death in 1869. His property was home to a total of 27 residents at the time of the 1860 census. Hjort and his family still resided in the first-floor apartment with his 30-year-old son Andreas, his 24-year-old daughter Sophie Marie and a maid. His brother Johan Edvard Peter Hjort and sister Andrea Marie Hjort resided together in the apartment on the third floor. Alexander Ballen, a merchant (grosserer), resided on the ground floor with his wife, two children, a maid and a female cook. Jens Petersen, an employee at the adjacent Royal Pawn, resided in the basement with his wife and five children.

=== Later history ===
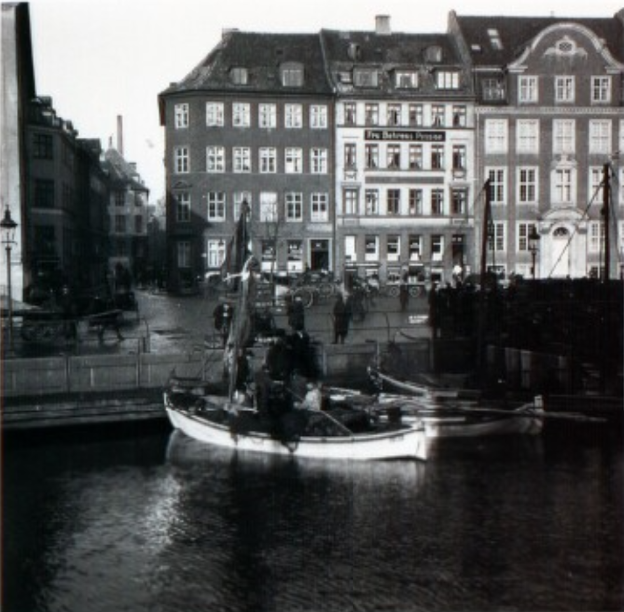
Fishing boats in front of the building

The painter Carl Bloch lived in an apartment on the first floor from 1873 to 1875. The film director Carl Th. Dreyer lived on the third flor in 1932–1933.

The property belonged to Atlas Ejendomme A/S (later renamed Landic Property Denmark A/S) in 2008. In October 2009, Jeudan acquired Landic Property Denmark's portfolio of 32 properties, including Gammel Strand, for DKK 2 billion.

== Architecture ==
The building consists of four storeys over a high cellar and is constructed in red bricks of the type known as Brehmen bricks (Danish: Bremersten). It has five bays towards the canal, a centered corner bay and seven bays towards the street Naboløs.

The building was listed on the Danish registry of protected buildings and places on 16 July 1945.

== Today ==
The building is today owned by Jeudan.
