= Naboløs 3 =

Listed building in Copenhagen

Baboløs 3
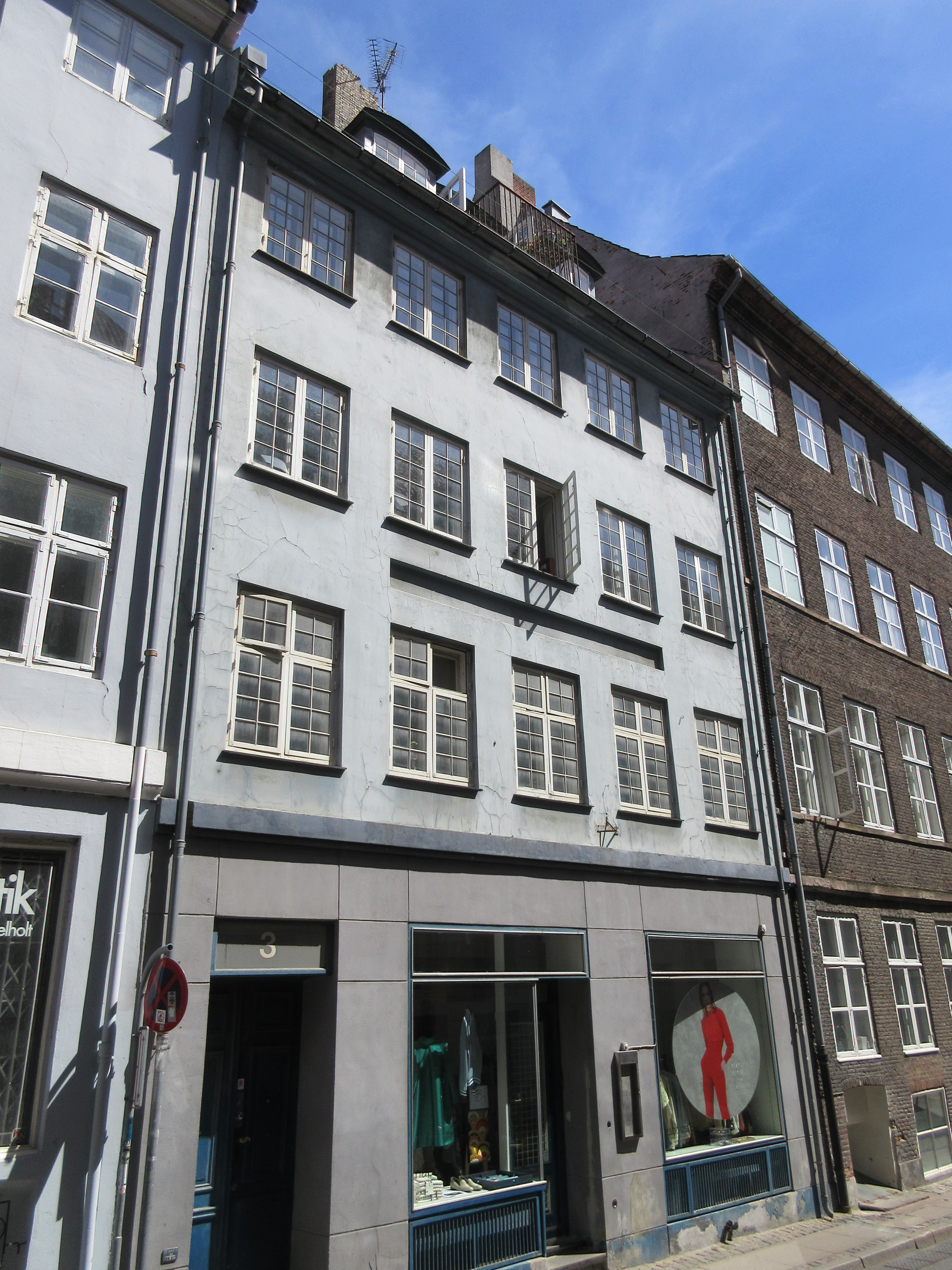
- Interactive map of the Baboløs 3 area

General information
- Location: Copenhagen, Denmark
- Coordinates: 55°40′39.29″N 12°34′37.7″E
- Completed: 1798

Naboløs 3 is a Neoclassical building situated around the corner from Gammel Strand in the Old Town of Copenhagen, Denmark. It was listed on the Danish registry of protected buildings and places in 1945.

== History ==
=== 18th century ===
The entire eastern side of Nabol's (now Naboløs 1–5) was formerly made up of one large property. On 11 October 1504, it belonged to Gaarden Peder Kempe. His widow Karina kept the property until her death after 24 July 1542. It was then passed to their son Roidker Kempe. In 1758, it was acquired by mayor Anders Knudsen Skriver. His widow Sidsel Poulsdatter kept the property after his death in 1579. After her own death in 1611, it passed to their son Christoffer Andersen (died 22 November 1617), an innkeeper and councilman, who was married to Anne Marcusdatter Hess. After her death it was sold to the Crowbn (19 September 1626. On 15 October 1636, it was ceded to Wiwiche Kruse. In April 1648, he transferred it to the son Ulrich Christian Gyldenløve til Ulrichsholm. On 16 December 1649, he ceded the property to Johan Stenkull. By Raadstuedom of 12 December 1670, the property was ceded to Clavs Condevin. After his death, it passed to his heir Hans Johansen. On 30 January 1676, he presented it to councilman and co-owner Bartholomeus Jensen. On 15 March 1677, Bartholomeus Jensen ceded the property to etatsråd Jørgen Elers and his wife Margrete Vandal. Elers is remembered for founding Elers' Kollegium in Store Kannikestræde. Their property was listed in Copenhagen's first cadastre of 1689 as No. 19 in Strand Quarter. After his death on 17 September 1700, ot passed to the University of Copenhagen. On 18 June 1707, it was sold to merchant Hans Jørgen Høserich. He owned the property until at least 1728.

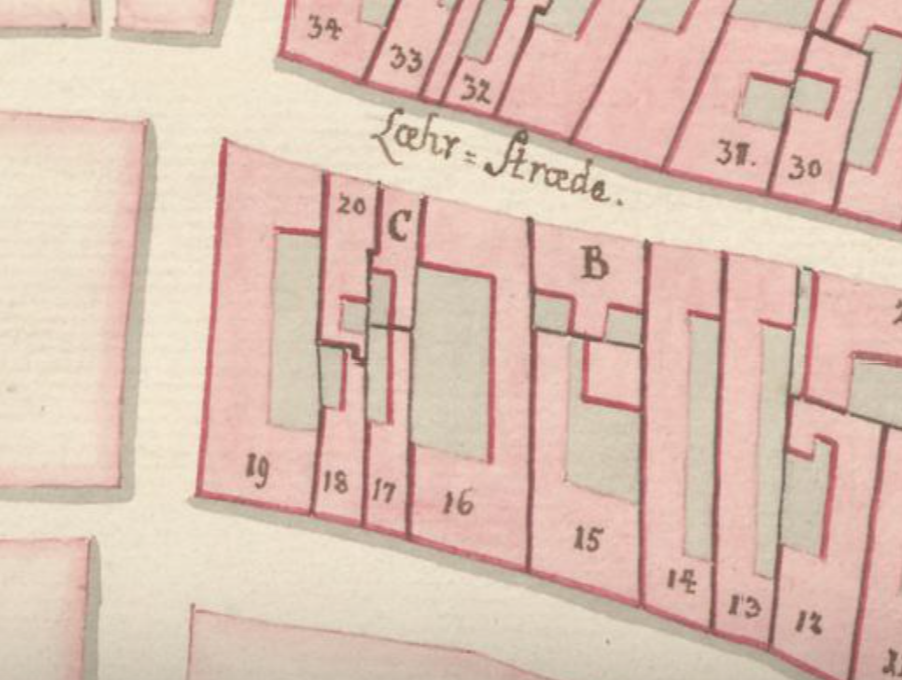
No. 19 seen on a detail from Christian Gedde's map of Strand Quarter, 1756.

In 1756, No. 19 was owned by post inspector Peter Bech.

The property was later acquired by wallpaper manufacturer and royal agent Abraham Moses Henriques (1721–1802). In October 1770, one of the apartments was let out to treasurer at Kurantbanken Rasmus Møller. The annual rent was 210 Danish rigsdaler plus a minor contrubution to the annual property taxes. Møller and his family lived in the building until authumn 1775. They moved after buying a property in Laksegade. Møller was later convicted of embezzlement against the banl.

Abraham Moses Henriques' property was home to 25 residents in five households at the 1787 census. The owner resided in the building with his third wife Sara, their eight-year-old daughter, seven children from his second marriage (aged 13 to 21) and two maids. Johan Frederik Leth (1838–1918), a colonel lieutenant at the Zealand Regiment, resided in the building with his two children (aged five and 18), a male servant and two maids. Cay Hendrich Licht, a captain in the Norwegian Life Regiment, resided in the building with one servant and one maid. Jacob Adler, a junk dealer, resided in the building with his wife Chatrine Marie. Maria Cathrine Tykøv, widow of a gunmaker at the Royal Arsenal, resided in the building with her two daughters (aged 11 and 12).

The property was destroyed in the Copenhagen Fire of 1795. The building on the other side of the street Naboløs just escaped the flames. The site was after the fire acquired by master builder Hans Christian Ondrup (1751-1814). He divided the fire site into three separate properties. The building at the corner of Gammel Strand (No. 16A) was constructed by him in 1796–97. It was followed by No. 19B (now Naboløs 3) in 1798 and finally No. 19C (now Naboløs 1) at the corner with Læderstræde in 1798–99.

=== 1840 census ===
The property was home to 28 residents in five households at the 1840 census. Jens Nielsen, a workman, resided on the ground floor with his wife Mette Marie Thommesen, their two children (aged three to five) and one maid. Johanne Catharine Foersom, a widow with a pension, resided on the first floor with a son, a daughter and a maid. Hendrich Christian Jexen, a piano tuner, resided on the second floor with his wife Fredericke Amalie Hedegaard, their two daughters (aged seven and 11) and one maid. Knud Gundersen, a building painter, resided on the third floor with his wife Sara Marie Bierring, their four children (aged one to eight), his mother-in-law Kirstine Bierring and three lodgers. Jacob Christensen, a hatter (hattemagersvend), resided in the basement with his wife Daline Wilhelmine Nielsen, their two-year-old daughter and one maid.

=== 1850 census ===
The property was home to 21 residents in five households at the 1850 census. Jens Nielsen, a workman, resided on the ground floor with his wife Mette Marie Thomsen, their two daughters (aged 12 and 15) and one maid. Morten Madsen, a courier at Ordenskapitlet, resided on the first floor with his wife Ana Sophie Petersen. Christiane Cathrine Tuxen, widow of major Johan Georg Christian Tuxen (1792-1839), resided on the second floor with her son Carl Elias Holger Tuxen (1825-1886) and one maid. Jens Jørgensen, a guard at Danske Kancelli, resided on the third floor with his wife Mette Kirstine Jeppesen, their six-year-old daughter, a maid and a lodger. Ferdinand Christian Andersen, a cooper, resided in the basement with his wife Elisabeth Lund, their three children (aged one to five) and one maid.

=== 1860 census ===
The property was only home to 17 residents in four households at the 1860 census. Carl Jacob August Clausen, a bookbinder, resided on the ground floor with his wife Wilhelmine (née Christensen) and their six-year-old daughter. Ane Sophie Madsen (née Kaspersen), a widow with means, resided on the first floor with the lodger Julius Alexander Lars Petersen (bookbinder). Johan Wilhelm Thorsen, a pianoforte tuner, resided on the third floor with his wife Anna (née Sommer) and their six children (aged three to 15). Ferdinant Christian Andersen, a wooden shoe-maker, resided in the basement with his wife Elisabeth (née Lind) and their three children (aged 10 to 13).

=== 1880 census ===
The property was home to 26 residents at the 1880 census. Jokum Christian Eggert, a pawnnbroker, resided on the ground floor with three daughters (aged 19 to 28). Henriette Jørgensen, a laundry woman, resided on the third floor with her niece Eny Jørgensen and one maid. I. Petersen, a bag seller, resided on the first floor with his wife Vilhelmine Petersen and their four children (aged three to 22). Lassen ??, a baker, resided on the second floor with his wife Licoline Sofie Lassen and their four-year-old son. Theodor Mortensen, a seaman, resided on the fourth floor with his wife Beate Mortensen and their three children (aged three to 13). Christine Camilla Rasmussen and Johanne Christine Petersen, two seamstresses, resided in the other fourth-floor apartment. Niels Svendsen, a grocer (høker), resided in the basement with his wife Sophie Christine Svendsen and one maid.

== Architecture ==
Naboløs is constructed with four storeys over a walk-out basement. The plastered and white-painted, five-bay-wide facade is finished with a projecting cornice band above the ground floor, a slightly recessed band above the three central windows of the second floor and a cornice below the roof. The rear side of the building is plastered and painted in a pale yellow colour. The pitched red tile roof features three dormer windows towards the street. The roof ridge is pierced by a chimney. The interior walls of the staircase is decorated with plaster reliefs.

== Today ==
Naboløs 3 is owned by lawyer Lennart Aure Ricard. He is a son of Supreme Court attorney Carl Ricard (1802–1993). The building contains a commercial lease on the ground floor and in the basement and a single residential apartment on each of the three upper floors.
