= Skindergade 22 =

Listed building in Copenhagen

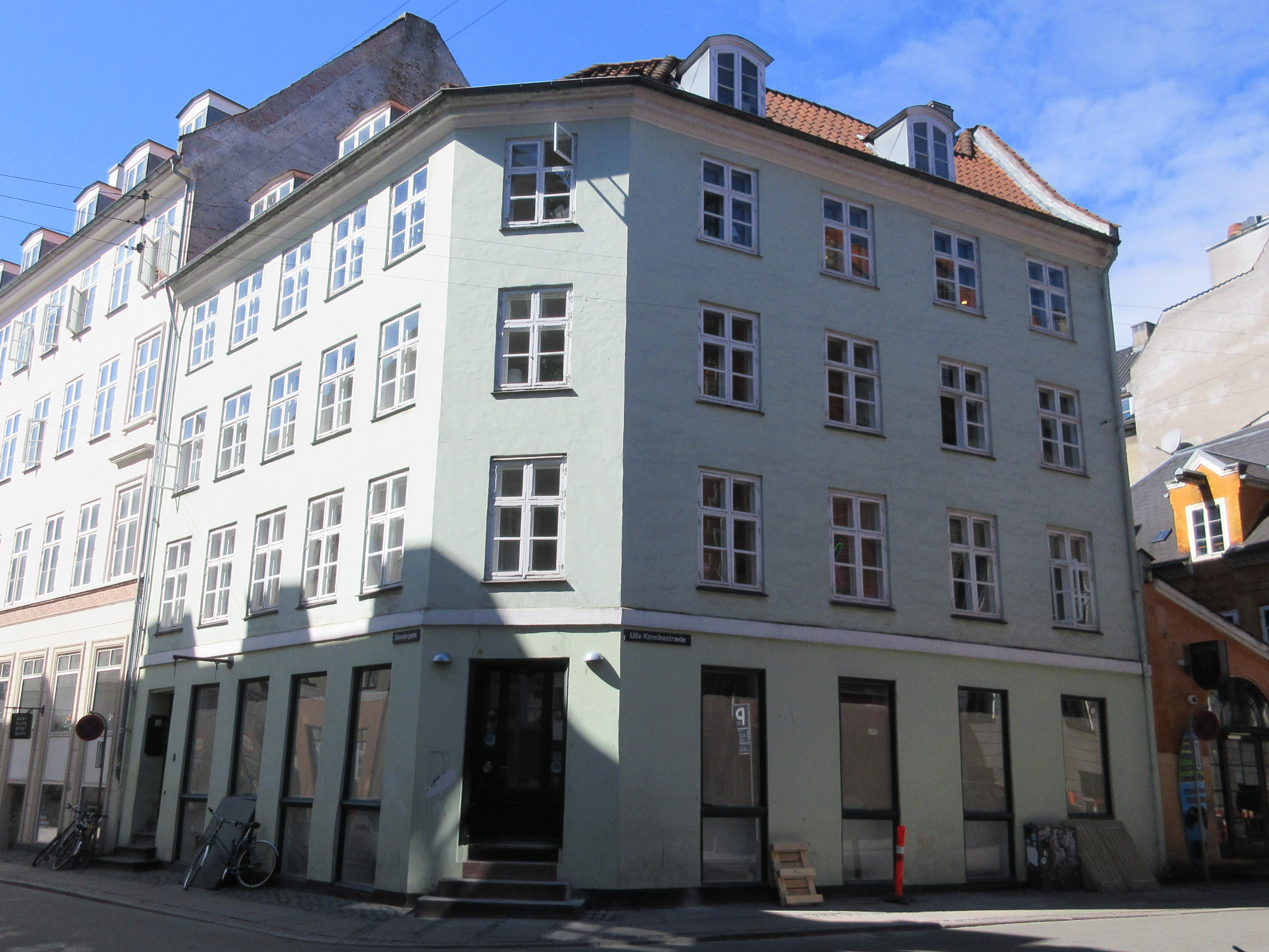
- Interactive map of the Skindergade 22 area

General information
- Location: Copenhagen, Denmark
- Coordinates: 55°40′47.64″N 12°34′28.9″E
- Completed: 1810

Skindergade 22 is a Neoclassical building situated at the corner of Skindergade and Lille Kannikestræde in the Old Town of Copenhagen, Denmark. It was listed in the Danish registry of protected buildings and places in 1979. Jens Andersen Hansen, publisher of the newspaper Almuevennen and a member of the Danish Constituent Assembly, was a resident of the building in around 1849.

== History ==
=== Site history, 1689–1795 ===
The property was listed in Copenhagen's first cadastre of 1689 as No. 22 in Klædebo Quarter, owned by smith Arv Svendsen. On 11 June 1711, it was acquired by distiller Peder Nielsen. On 20 October 1728, it was acquired by distiller Thomas Olesen. He remained the owner of the property until 11 June 1740.

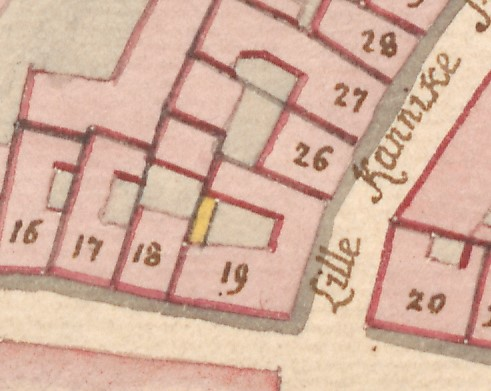
No. 19 seen in a detail from Christian Gedde's map of Klædebo Quarter, 1757

The property was listed in the new cadastre of 1756 as No. 19 in Klædebo Quarter, owned by brass caster (Gelbgießer) Paul Henrik Rösche.

The property was home to 15 residents in three households at the 1787 census. Knud Walsøe, rodemester of Klædebo Quarter, resided in the building with his wife Ellen Bønner and one maid. Johan Frimodt (1715–1796), an auction director, resided in the building with his wife Elisabet, their two sons (aged 14 and 25) and one maid. Hans Halensen, a 37-year-old man (no profession mentioned), resided in the building with his wife Marie Kierstine, their one-year-old son, one maid and two lodgers.

=== Niels Jensen Lund and the new buildings ===
The property was destroyed in the Copenhagen Fire of 1795, together with most of the other buildings in the area. A new building was constructed on the site relatively shortly thereafter. The property was thus home to 16 residents in three households at the 1801 census. Niels Jensen Lund, a distiller, resided in the building with his wife Kirstine Petersdatter, one male employee and one maid. Iver Lindegaard, a royal copyist, resided in the building with his wife Anne Margrethe Schau, their three children (aged two to nine) and one maid. Knud Walsøe (the rodemester from the 1787 census) was now living there with them as a lodger. Erich Walstrøm, a coppersmith and member of the Civilian Artillery, resided in the building with his wife Anne Bertelsdatter, their two daughters (aged one and three) and one lodger (teacher).

Lund's property was again listed as No. 18 in the new cadastre of 1806. The building was the following year destroyed in the British bombardment of Copenhagen. The present building on the site was constructed for him in 1809–10.

=== 1845 census ===
The property was home to 29 residents in six households at the time of the 1845 census. Hans Peter Iverse, a typographer, resided on the first floor with his wife Johanne Dortea Nielsen, their two-year-old daughter and a 14-year-old foster daughter. Joseph Nathan Sneukel, a master shoemaker, resided on the second floor with his wife Sarasin Sneukel, their two daughters aged two and five, the 29-year-old relative Caroline Sneukel (husjomfru), one maid, two shoemakers (employees) and one shoemaker's apprentice. Joseph Abrahamsen, a cigar manufacturer, resided in one of the third-floor apartments with his wife Rosa Freukel and mother-in-law Fiete Freukel. Niels Frederik Sørensen, a shoemaker (skomagersvend, employee), resided in the other third-floor apartment with his wife Johanne Marie Rinsgaard, their two children (aged two and nine) and two lodgers (shoemakers). Ole Olsen Holt, another master shoemaker, resided in the basement with his wife Lausine Magrete Hansen, their two-year-old daughter and one lodger. Anders Nielsen, a mill builder (møllebyggersvend), resided in the basement with his wife Cicilie Petersen and their 24-year-old daughter Karen Marie Nielsen.

=== 1846–1859 ===
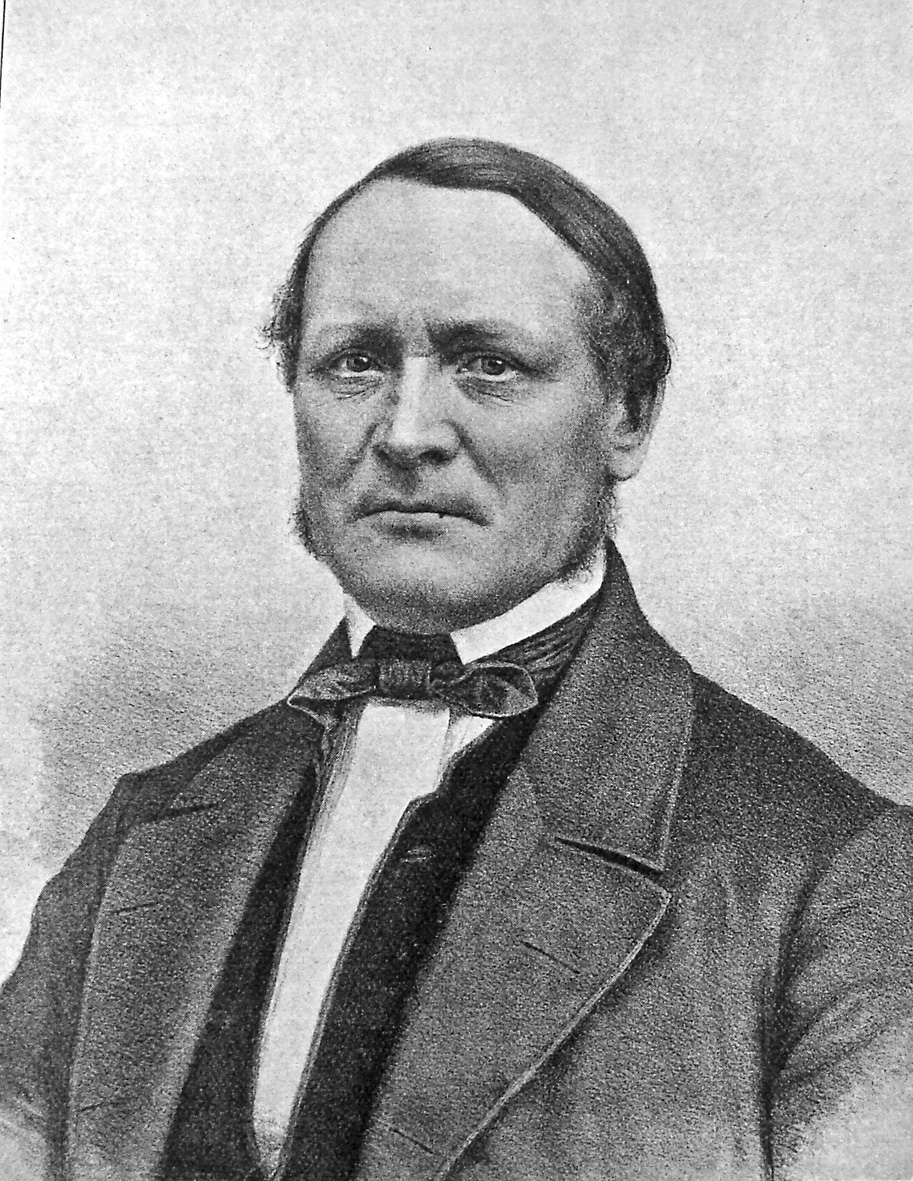
Jens Andersen Hansen

Jens Andersen Hansen (1806–1877), an editor and publisher of Almuevennen, resided in one of the apartments in 1849. He was elected to the Folketing later that same year.

The building was listed as Skindergade 22/Lille Kannikestræde 1 when house numbering by street was introduced in 1859 as a supplement to the old cadastral numbers by quarter.

=== 1860 census ===
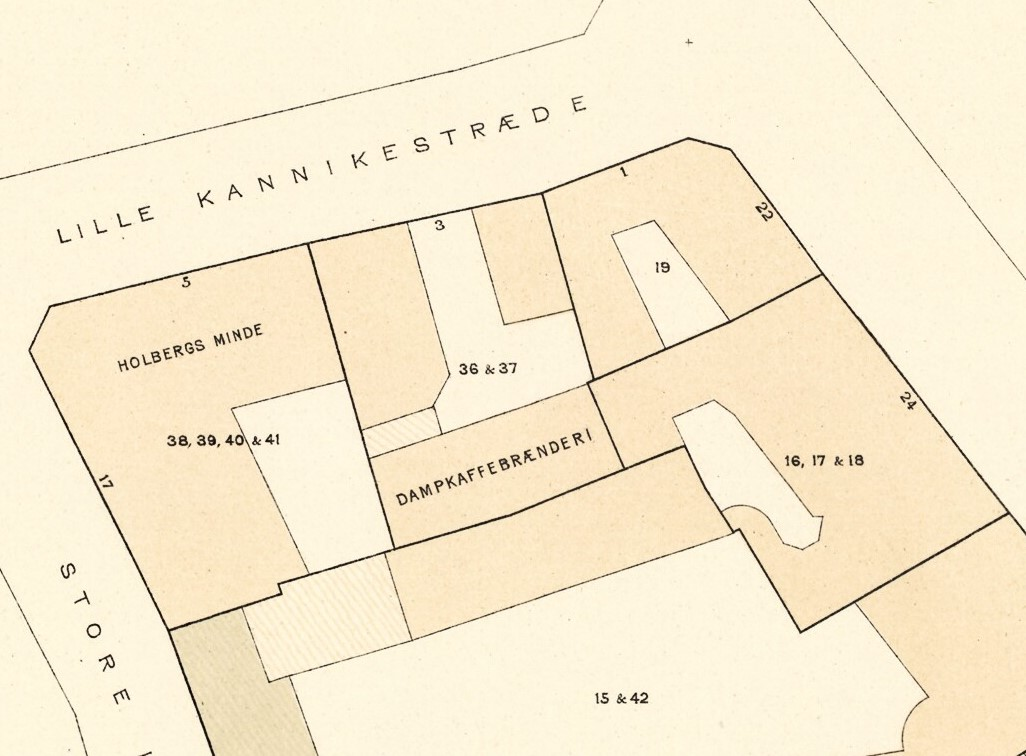
Skindergade 22 seen in a detail from one of Berggreen's block plans of Klædebo Quarter, 1886–88

The property was home to 38 residents at the 1860 census. Eduard Emil Weihe, a senior clerk (fuldmægtig), resided on the ground floor with his wife Hanne Margrethe, their four children (aged one to 10) and one maid. Peter Ursin, a master bookbinder, resided on the first floor with his wife Marie Katrine Ursin, their daughter Eline Marie Ursin, one maid and the lodger D. B. Vogelsang. Hans Georg Carl Thorlsen, a master bookbinder, resided on the second floor with his wife Juliane Elisabeth Thorlsen, their three children (aged seven to 16) and one maid. Carl Rudolph Prahl, an economist employed by Dagbladet, resided on the third floor with his wife Camilla Wilhelmine Cathrine Prahl, their two sons (aged one and three) and one maid. Johan Frederik Pohlmann, a 30-year-old workman, resided on the third floor with his wife Ida Mickelsen Pohlmann and their 10-year-old son. Jens Rasmussen, a 30-year-old man, was also resident on the third floor with his wife Caroline Rasmussen. Frederik Andersen, a workman, resided in the garret with his wife Hansine Andersen. Christian Anton Løchte, a brazier(gørtler), resided in the basement with his wife Anna Elisabeth Løchte, two daughters (aged 11 and 29) and the workman Charl Vilhelm Michelsen. Harthandel, a trader, resided in the basement with his wife Ane Corell and their 20-year-old daughter Christiane Petersen.

=== 20th century ===
længe Emil L. Olsen operated a combined glazier and frame shop in the building from around 1910. The building was listed in the Danish registry of protected buildings and places in 1979.

== Architecture ==
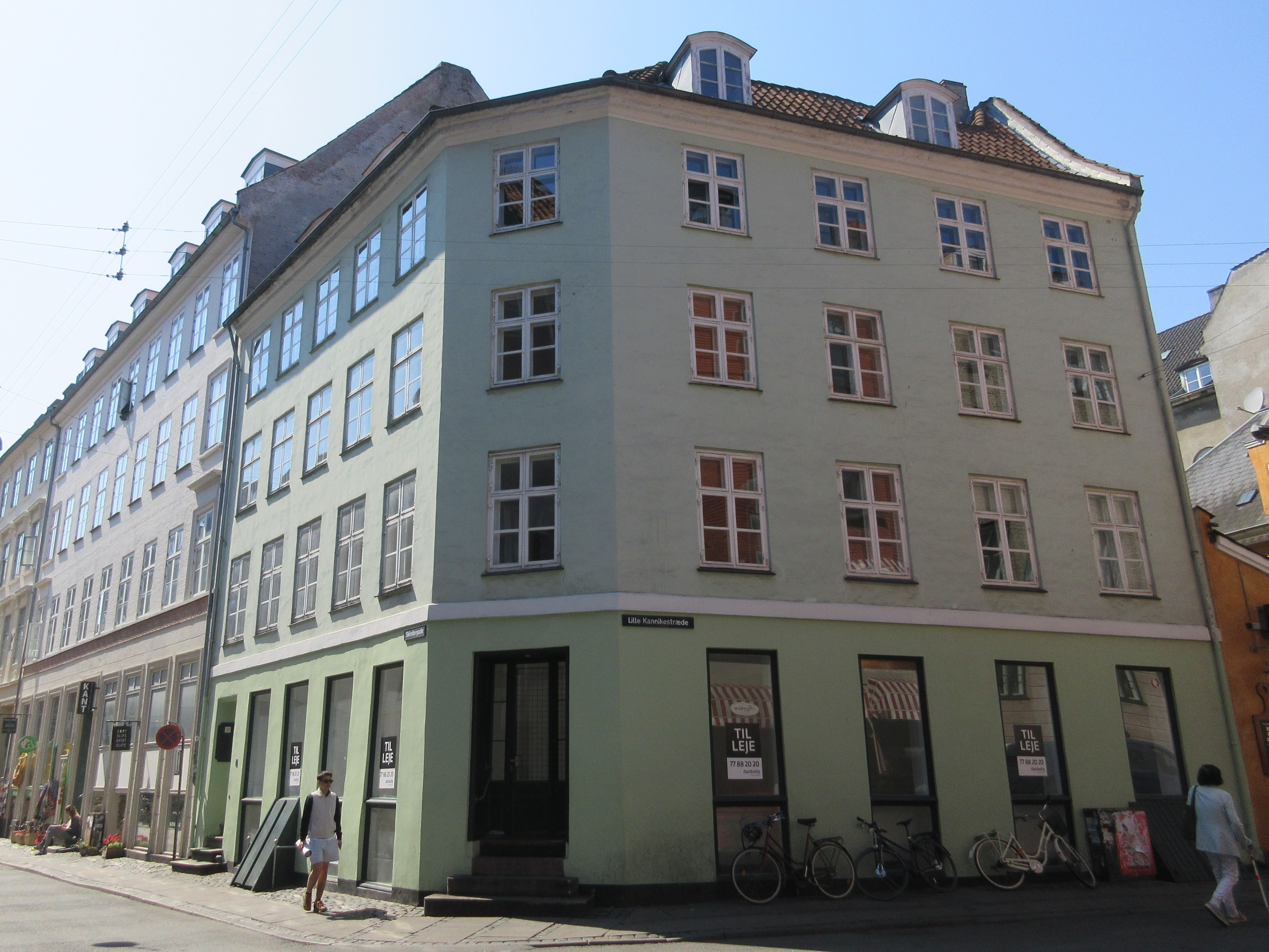
Skindergade 22/Lille Kannikestræde 1

Skindergade 22 is a corner building constructed with four storeys over a walk-out basement. It has a five-bays-long facade towards Skindergade, a four-bays-long facade towards Lille Kannikestræde and a chamfered corner. The latter was dictated for all corner buildings by Jørgen Henrich Rawert's and Peter Meyn's guidelines for the rebuilding of the city after the Copenhagen Fire of 1795 so that the fire department's long ladder companies could navigate the streets more easily. The plastered and white-painted facade is finished with a belt cornice above the ground floor and a simple cornice below the roof. A short side wing extends from the rear side of the Lille Kannikestræde wing along the west side of the central courtyard. The diminutive courtyard (or lightwell) is to the south bounded by Sjundergade 24. The upper part of the gable in Lille Kannikestræde is exposed since the adjacent building Lille Kannikestræde 3 is only one storey tall.

== Today ==
The building is owned by Skindergade 22 APS. It contains a café on the ground floor and in the basement, and residential apartments on the upper floors.
