= Kompagnistræde 2 =

Neoclassical property in Copenhagen, Denmark

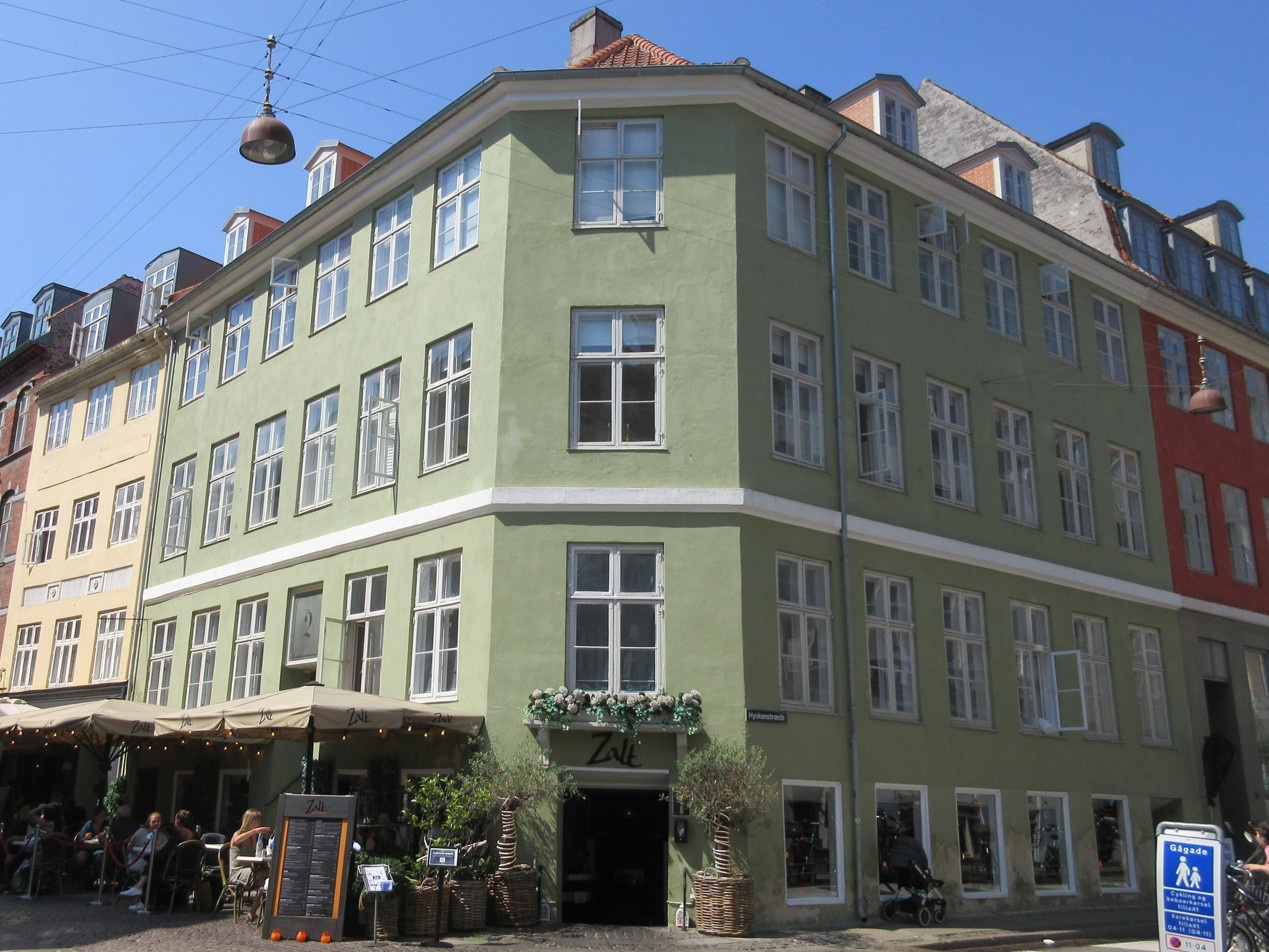
- Interactive map of the Kompagnistræde 2 area

General information
- Location: Copenhagen, Denmark
- Coordinates: 55°40′40.04″N 12°34′36.19″E
- Completed: 1797

Kompagnistræde 2 is a Neoclassical property situated at the corner of Kompagnistræde and Hyskenstræde, part of the shopping street Strædet, in the Old Town of Copenhagen, Denmark. It was listed in the Danish registry of protected buildings and places in 1964. Former residents include the poet Christian Winther.

== History ==
=== 18th century ===
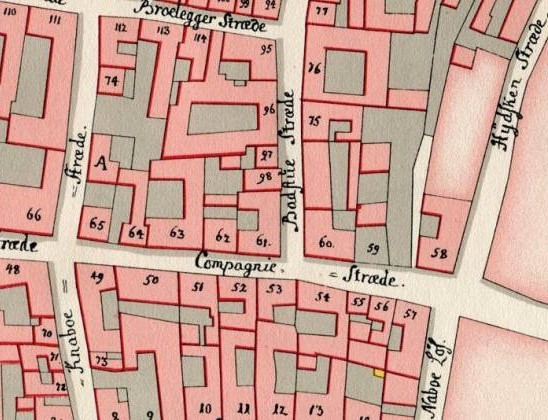
No. 58 seen in a detail from Christian Gedde's map of Snaren's Quarter, 1757

The site was part of a larger property in the late 18th century. It was listed as No. 59 in 1689, owned by byfoged Frederik Eisenberg. It was listed as No. 58, owned by joiner Julius David Schultze by 1756.

At the time of the 1787 census, No. 58 was home to a total of 12 households. Peder Pedersen, a grocer (spækhøker) and the owner of the property, resided there with his wife Anna Knudsen, an 11-year-old daughter from his first marriage and a maid. The tenants included Jewish merchant Liebmann Nathan, merchant Moses Rothenburg, violinist in the Royal Danish Orchestra Thomas Kainka, flour merchant Andreas Nielsen Bang, Meyer Levi, and merchant Nathan Berat.

The property was together with most of the other buildings in the area destroyed in the Copenhagen Fire of 1684. The current building on the site was constructed in 1797 by master mason Lauritz Thrane.

=== 19th century ===
The building was owned in 1801 by tea merchant Friderich Christian Christensen. He resided in one of the apartments with his wife Christiane Jensdatter, their ten-year-old son Christen Christensen, a maid and a lodger. The other tenants included goldsmith Marcus Levy, businessman Nathan Bendix Levy (1734–1818), teacher Abraham Elkan, merchant Christian Brill, joiner Niels Mathias Holbech and tailor Georg Groskrøch.

The property was listed as No. 61 in the new cadastre of 1806. It was owned by beer vendor (øltapper) C. F. Christiansen at that time.

Ole Christian Gammeltoft's wholesale business was based in the building from its foundation in June 1809. Gammeltoft did not himself live in the building. He and his wife lived at Lille Strandstræde No. 72 (now Lille Strandstræde 6).

The poet Christian Winther was among the residents of the building in 1833–1835.

At the time of the 1840 census, No. 61 was home to a total of 46 people. Nathan Simon Kælehar, a Jewish butcher, resided on the ground floor to the right with his wife Fredriche Kælehar, their seven children (aged eight to 21) and one maid. Jens Christian Boy, a 59-year-old former dyer, resided on the ground floor to the left with his wife Johanne Stenhuse and their four children (aged one to 12). K. Rosik, a master bookbinder, resided on the first floor to the left with three apprentices (aged 15 to 20) and one maid. Frans J. Hinse, a master tailor (widower), resided on the second floor to the right with his three children (aged 17 to 25). Louise Amalia Uttenreitter (née Romeicke), the 62-year-old widow of master tailor Carolus Ignatius Uttenreitter, resided on the second floor to the left with three of her children, a lodger and a maid. Broder Larsen, a master plumber, resided in the basement to the left with his wife Dortea Andersen, the 23-year-old woman Vigeline Larsen and two apprentices (aged 18 and 19). Hans Christensen Jyderop, a beer vendor (øltapper), resided in the basement to the right with wife Johanne Nielsen and two maids.

At the time of the 1860 census, No. 61 was home to a total of 30 people.

Grocer Peter W. Bur (urtekræmmer), resided on the ground floor and in the basement with his wife Marie Bur, one lodger, two employees in the grocery business (urtekræmmersvende), a caretaker and a maid. Ludvig Andersen, a plumber, resided in another apartment with his wife Johanne Andersen and their three children (aged three to seven). The other residents included a couple of tailors (one of them a master tailor), a clerk and a widow with her two daughters.

At the time of the 1880 census, Kompagnistræde 2 was home to a total of 22 people. Jens Christian Boy, the 77-year-old owner of the property, resided on the first floor with his wife Johanne Frederikke Boy and their daughter Johanne Mathine Boy. Caroline Sophie Frost, a 67-year-old widow, was also residing on the first floor with her son Carl Frederik Vilhelm Frost and one maid. Peter Valdemar Beer, a grocer (urtekræmmer), resided on the ground floor with his wife Marie Beer, her sister Alma Dagmar Holm and one maid. Three unmarried men in their 20s—Johan Vilhelm Flemon, Hermann Kruse and Hans Jensen—shared the other ground floor apartment. Jørgen Hendrik Petersen, a retailer, resided on the second floor with his wife Frederikke Dorthea Petersen, their son Jørgen Einar Petersen, a maid and a lodger. David Salomon, a former shoemaker, resided in the other second floor apartment with the 53-year-old widow Sophie Petersen. A plumber's shop was located in the basement.

== Architecture ==
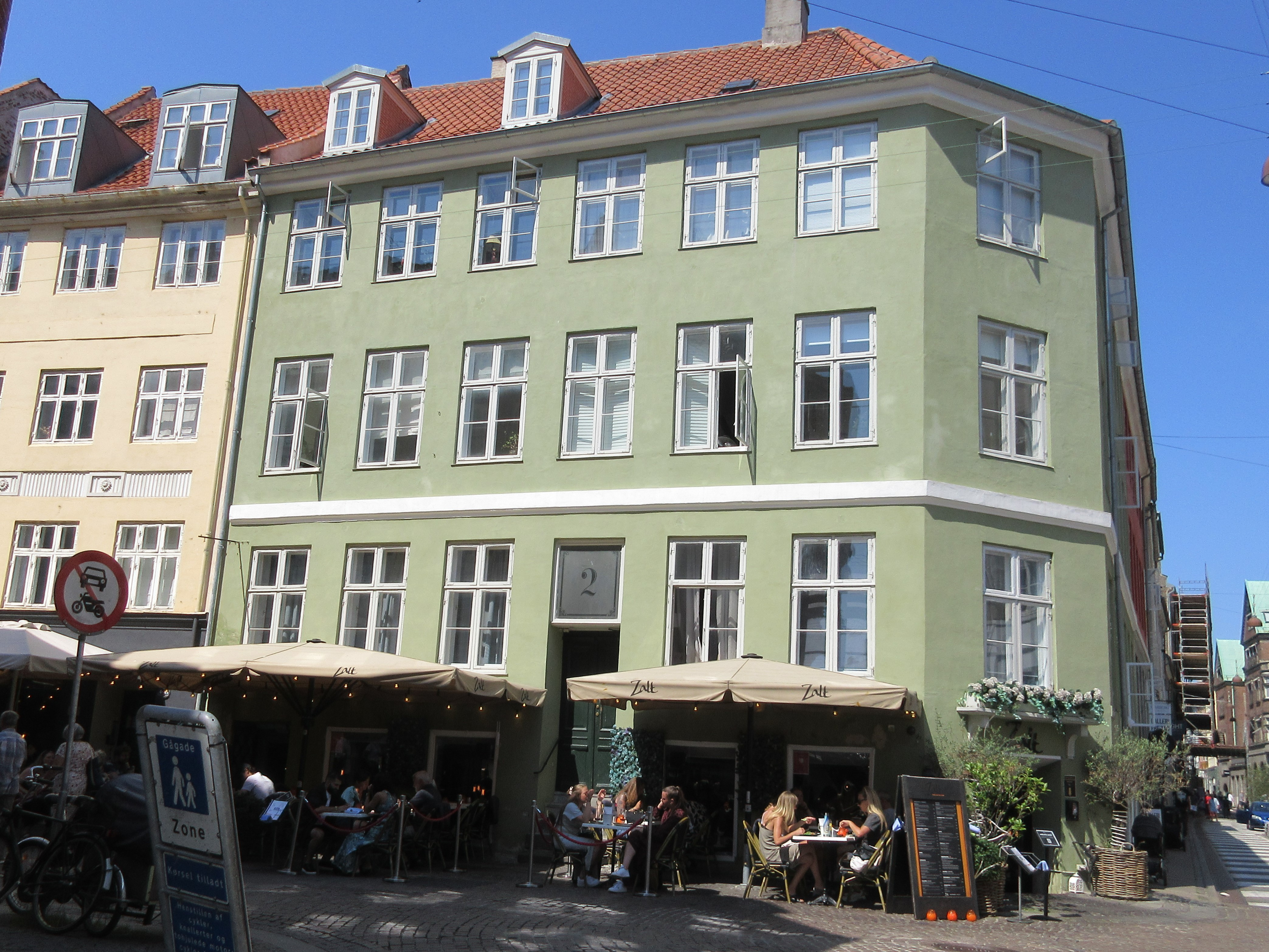
The Kompagnistræde facade

Constructed with four storeys over a walk-out basement, Kompagnistræde 2 is a corner building with a six-bay-long facade towards both streets and a chamfered corner. The latter was dictated for all corner buildings by Jørgen Henrich Rawert's and Peter Meyn's guidelines for the rebuilding of the city after the fire so that the fire department's long ladder companies could navigate the streets more easily. The yellow-painted, plastered facade is finished with a white-painted belt course above the ground floor and a white-painted cornice. The main entrance in Kompagnistræde, an inset doorway topped by a large transom window, in the fourth bay from the left (west), is raised a few steps from street level. The basement entrance in the corner bay is topped by a white-painted hood mould supported by corbels. The pitched red tile roof is pierced by three chimneys. The yard side of the building is also plastered and painted yellow.

== Today ==
The building is currently owned by E/F Kompagnistræde 2.
