= Kalkeballen =

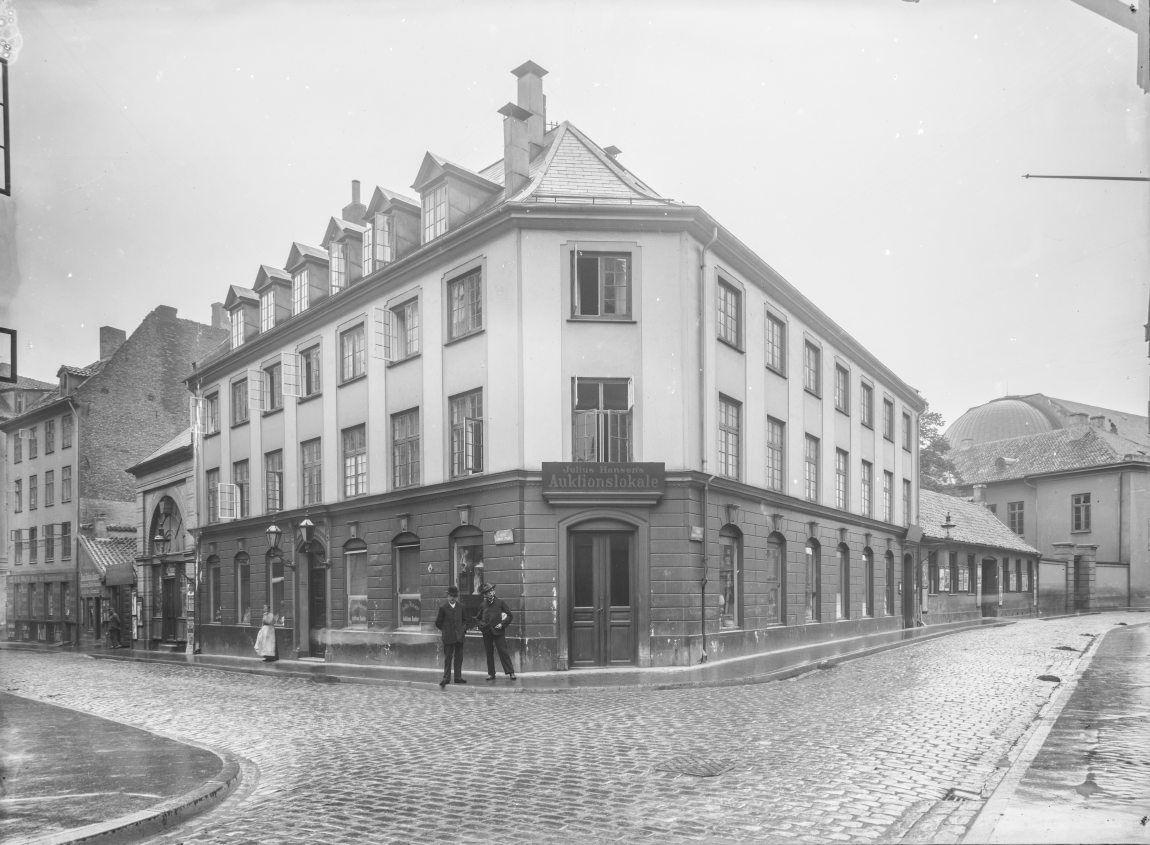
The building photographed by Johannes Hauerslev

Kalkeballen was a theatre located at the corner of Store Kannikestræde and Lille Kannikestræde in Copenhagen, Denmark. It was a popular entertainment venue for members of the lower middle class, complementing the Royal Danish Theatre which was frequented by the bourgeoisie. It closed in 1864 as a result of increasing competition from other privately run theatres, such as the Casino Theatre and Folketeatret (1857).

== History ==
=== The theatre ===
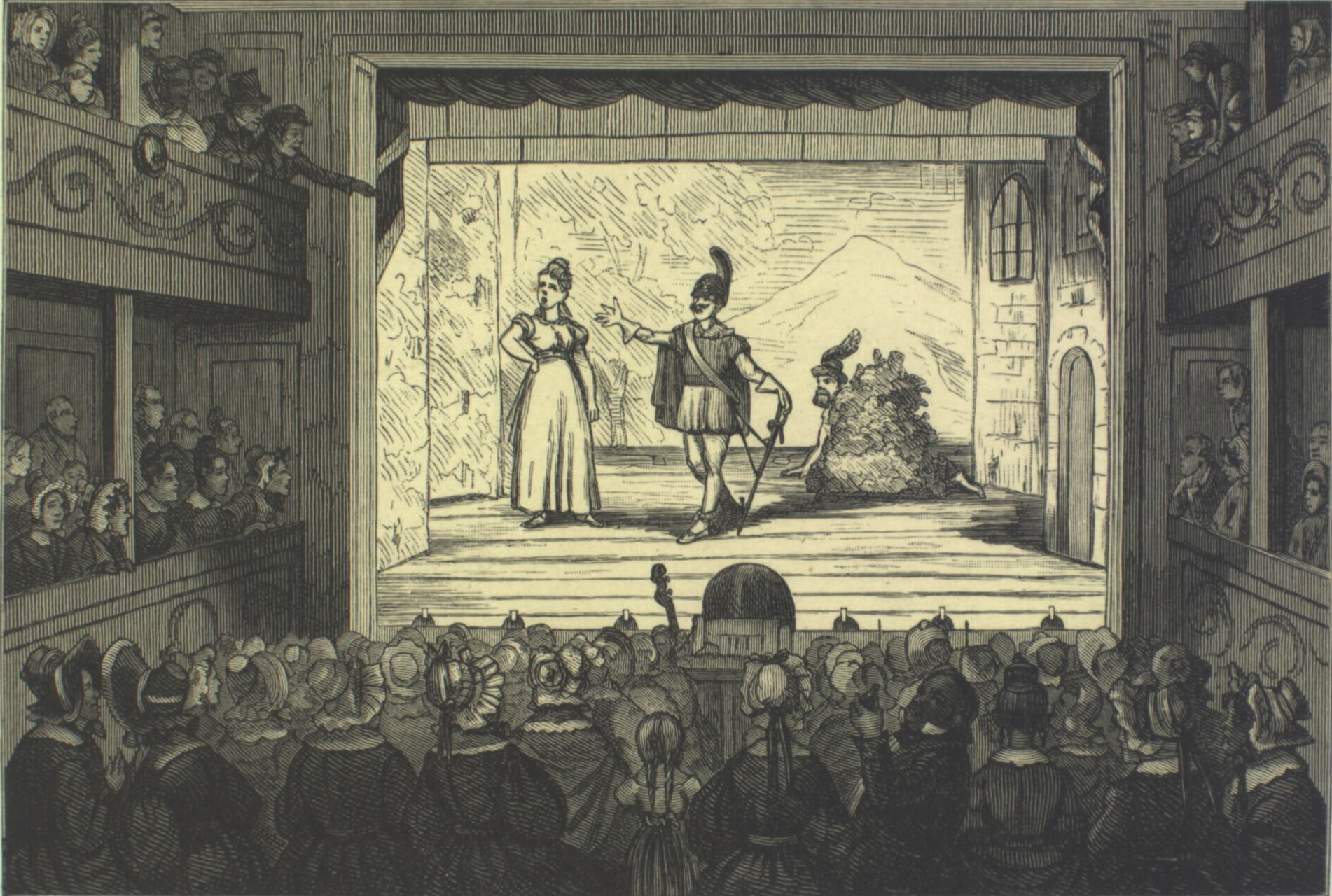
Kalkeballen on a drawing by P. C. Klæstrup

Kalkeballen was constructed in 1819 and served as a venue for amateur theatre. Most of the city's guilds had their own theatre companies. Some of the amateur actors who had their debut at Kalkeballen would later have careers at some of the city's professional theatres. These included Folketeatret-founder Hans Wilhelm Lange, Harald and Valdemar Kolling, Frederik Helsengreen, Knoblauch, Frederik Madsen and Christian Schmidt. Students at the Royal Danish Theatre were also among the actors. The theatre closed in 1864 as a result of increasing competition from other privately run theatres.

=== Later history of the building ===
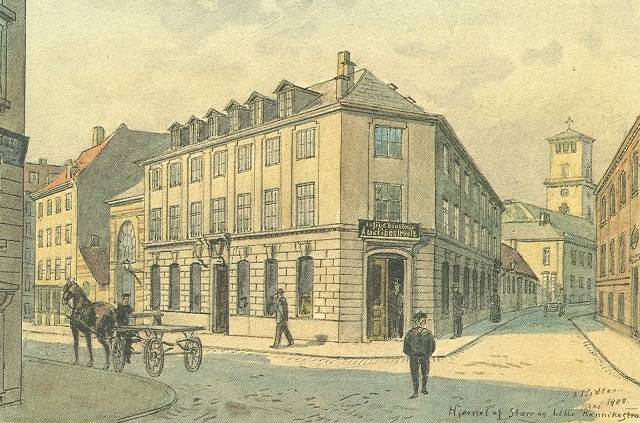
The building in a drawing by Janus Laurentius Ridter

The building was then operated as a dance venue under the name Eriksens Salon. The entertainment venue Valkyrien on Vesterbrogade relocated to the building in the late 1890s. It closed in the 1914. The building was then for a few years used by an auction house. It was in 1917 purchased by the Danish branch of the YWCA (KFUK).

== See also ==
- Lille Grønnegade Theatre
