= Hyskenstræde =

Street in Copenhagen, Denmark

Htskenstræde
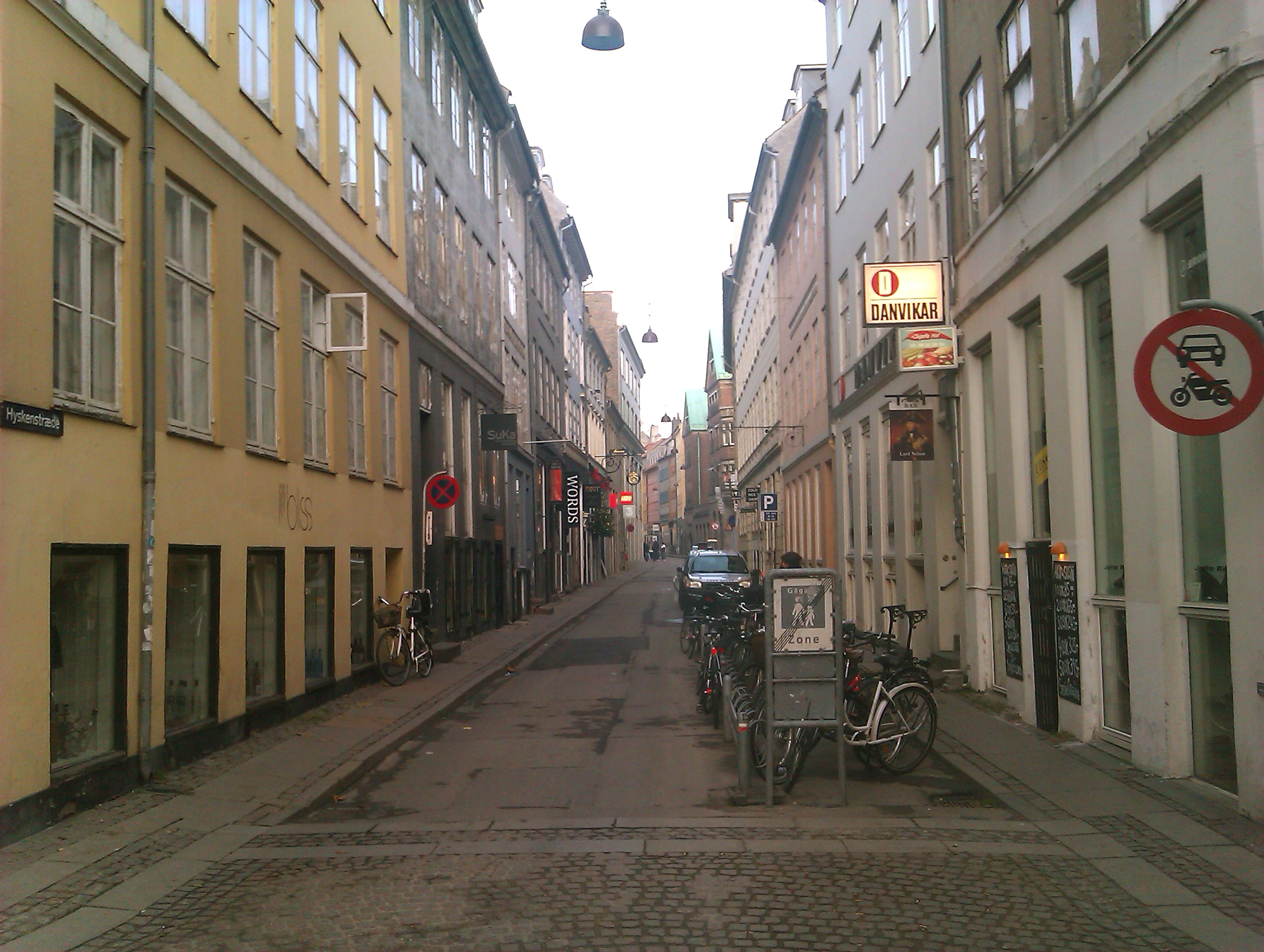
- Length: 100 m (330 ft)
- Location: Indre By, Copenhagen, Denmark
- Postal code: 1207
- Nearest metro station: Gammel Strand
- Coordinates: 55°41′41.94″N 12°34′35.05″E

Hyskenstræde is a street in the Old Town of Copenhagen, Denmark. It runs from the pedestrian street Strøget (Vimmelskaftet) in the northwest to Kompagnistræde in the southeast from where it continues as Naboløs for another block to Gammel Strand.

== History ==
The name is derived from the German word Häuschen, meaning "Small Houses", a reference to the public toilets that were located on piles in the water at the far end of the street. One of the two public toilets, Østre Mag (Eastern "Mag", mag being another word for public toilet, cf. Magstræde).), was located in front of the street.

In c. 1600, the street became known as Lasse Winders Stræde after city councilor Lars "Vinner" Nielsen. In the beginning of the 16th century, after the public toilet had been removed, the street once again became known as Hyskenstræde.

== Notable buildings and residents ==
No. 3-5, No. 7, No. 9, No. 14 and No. 16 are all listed on the Danish registry of protected buildings and places.

== Commemorative plaque ==
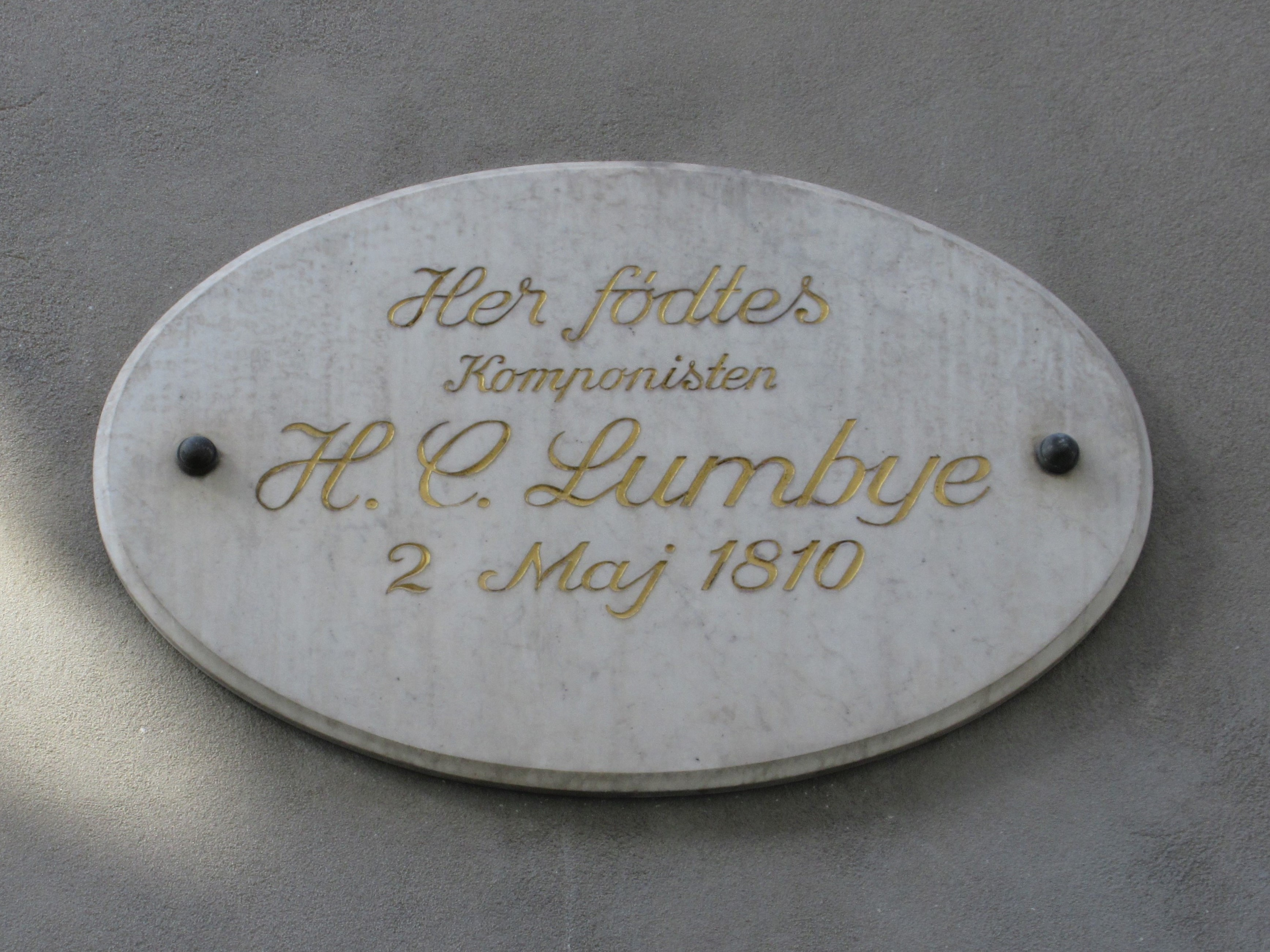
The H. C. Lumbye plaque

On the facade of No. 10 is a plaque that commemorates that the composer Hans Christian Lumbye was born at the site on 2 May 1810.

== Cultural references ==
The street and the background for its name is mentioned in the beginning of Hans Christian Andersen's 1858 short story Pebersvendens Natur.
