= Hans Christopher Ondrup =

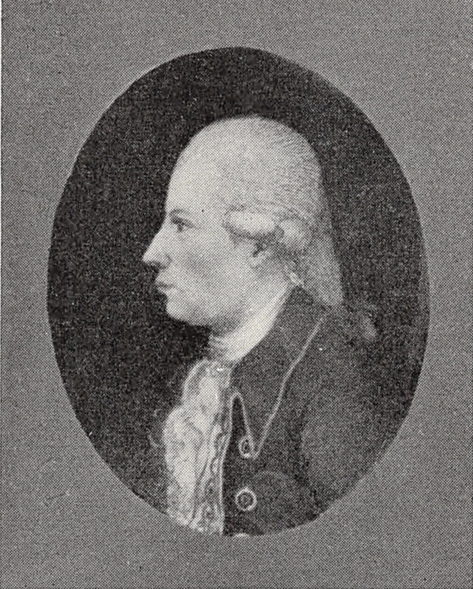
- Self-portrait by Ondrup, 1783.
- Born: 1751; Copenhagen, Denmark
- Died: 1814 (aged 62–63)
- Occupation: Architect

Signature
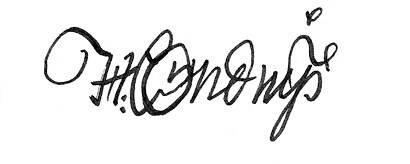

Hans Christopher Ondrup (1751 – 24 January 1814), usually referred to as H.C. Ondrup, was a Danish master builder, stucco artist and porcelain painter. He constructed a number of buildings in Copenhagen in the 1780s and 1800s, most of which have now been listed on the Danish registry of protected buildings and places.

== Biography ==
Ondrup was born in Copenhagen. He worked as a porcelain painter at the Royal Porcelain Manufactury in 1667 and completed an apprenticeship as a stucco artist in 1779. He became a member of the Masons' Guild in 1783 and became a master mason in 1789.

== Selected buildings ==
Ondrup has constructed the following buildings in Copenhagen:

- Dronningens Tværgade 5, Copenhagen (1793-1794, with A. Gjedde)
- Dronningens Tværgade 7 (1794, with A. Gjedde)
- Dronningens Tværgade 9 (1794, with A. Gjedde)
- Gammel Strand 52/Naboløs 5 (1797–98)
- Knabrostræde 15 (1797–98)
- Naboløs 1 (1798–99)
- Naboløs 3 (1798)
- Rosengården 9 (1811-1812)
