= Naboløs =

Street in Copenhagen, Denmark

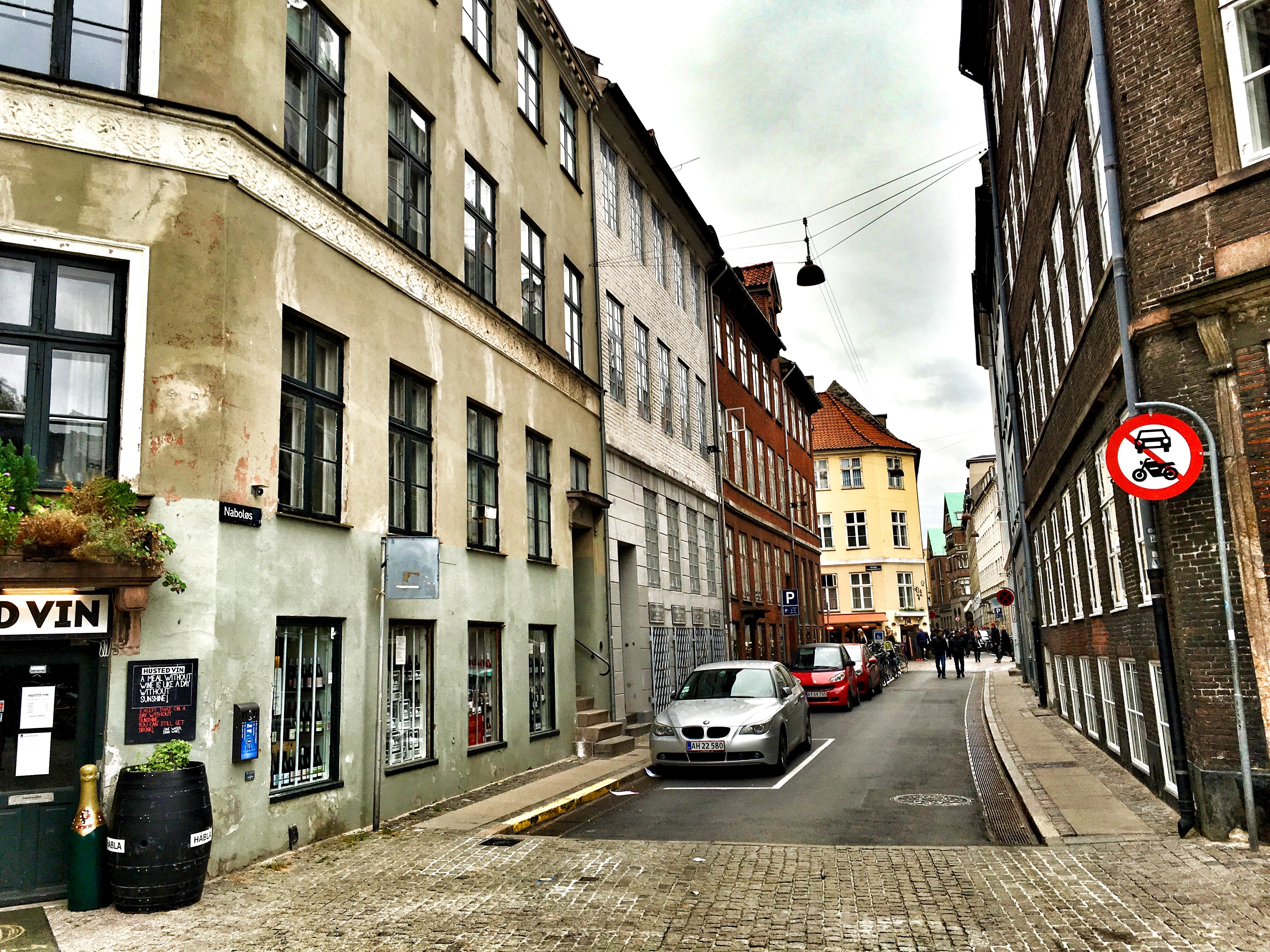
- Length: 50 m (160 ft)
- Location: Indre By, Copenhagen, Denmark
- Postal code: 1206
- Nearest metro station: Gammel Strand
- Coordinates: 55°40′39″N 12°34′37.5″E

Naboløs (literally "Without Neighbours") is a short street in the Old Town of Copenhagen, Denmark. All six properties in the street date from the rebuilding of the city in the years after the Copenhagen Fire of 1795 and have been added to the Danish registry of protected buildings and places. Together with Hyskenstræde it provides a direct link between the shopping street Strøget and the metro station at Gammel Strand.

== History ==
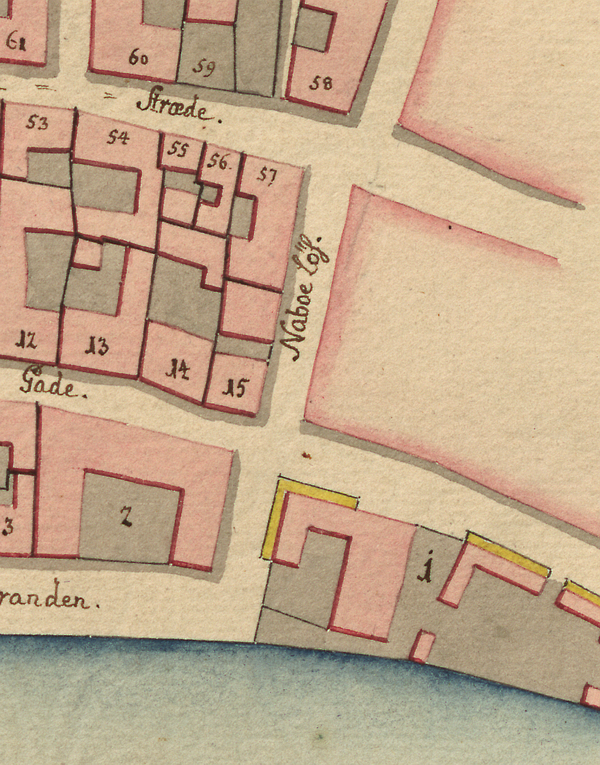
Naboløs seen in a detail from Christian Gedde's map of Snaren's Quarter, 1756

In the Middle Ages the street was considered part of Hyskenstræde. In the 16th century it became known under various names. In 1551 it is thus referred to as "that street where Niels Tommesen lives" ("thet strede som Niels Tommesen wdi boer") and in 1604 as Vejerhusstræde (Weighhouse Street) after the weigh house (vejerboden) which had been built at Gammel Strand in 1581. The name Naboløs is first seen in 1713, probably because only one house fronted the street at that time. This situation lasted until the Copenhagen Fire of 1728. The street was again destroyed in the Copenhagen Fire of 1795. The Vejerbod was demolished in 1857.

== Notable buildings and residents ==
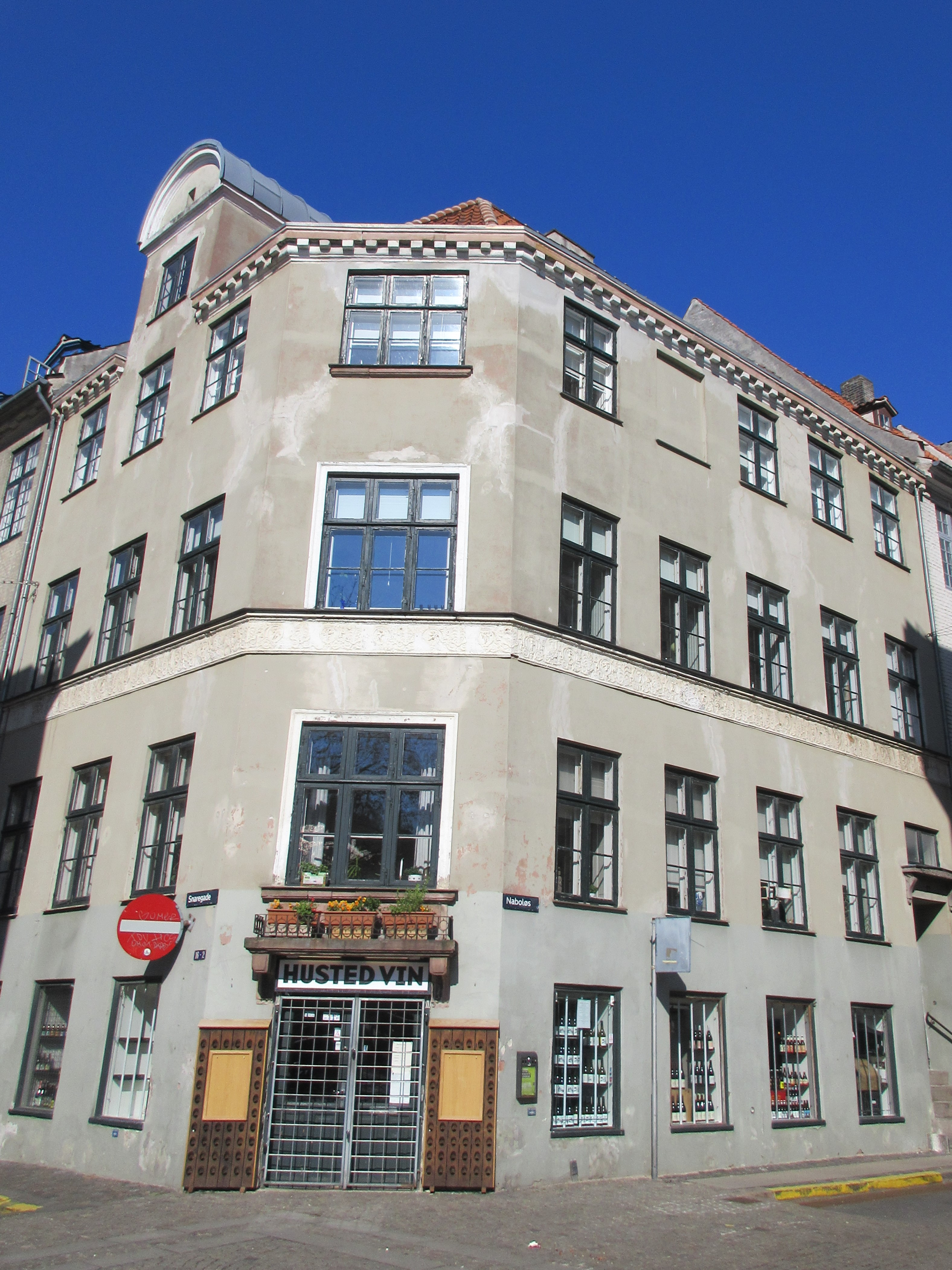
No. 6: Henriette Melchiors Stiftelse

All six buildings in the street have been listed on the Danish registry of protected buildings and places.

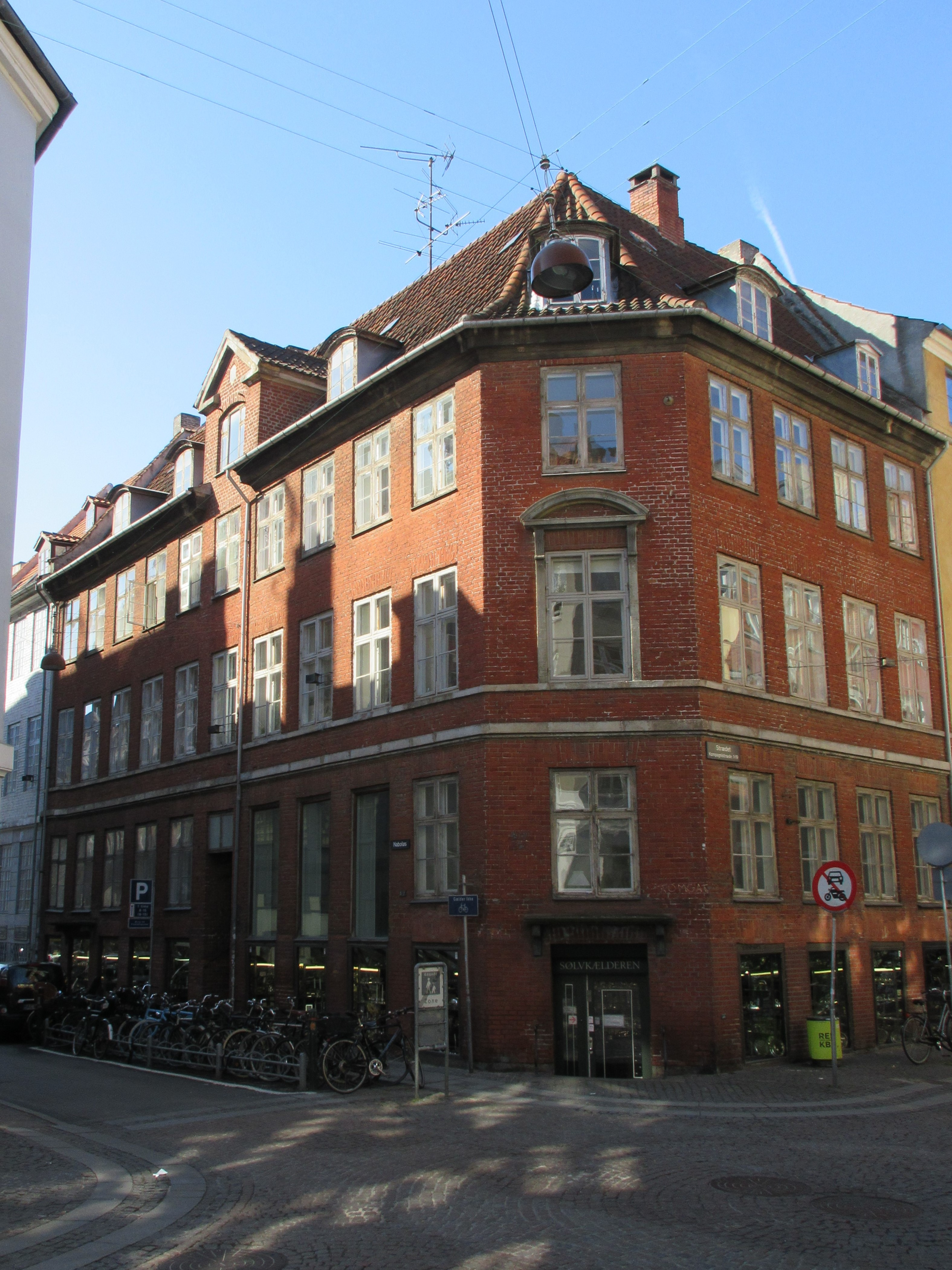
No.2

No. 6 was built for the Jewish merchant Lion Israel in 1796–1797. The area along Gammel Strand was home to Copenhagen's Jewish community. The city's first synagogue was situated in Læderstræde. The building was from 1861 owned by Israel's grandson Moses Melchior. In his will, Melchior converted the building into charitable housing for widows of artists and scientists, naming the institution Henriette Melchiors Stiftelse in honour of his sister Henriette.

No. 1 (1798–1799), No. 3 (1798) and No. 5 (1797–98) were all built by the master builder Hans Christian Ondrup.

No. 2 is from 1797 and was built by L. L. Thrane and Frantz Philip Lange. No. 4 is from 1802 and was designed by J. L. Thrane.

== Rxtermal links ==
- Naboløs at indenforvoldene.dk
