= Kurantbanken =

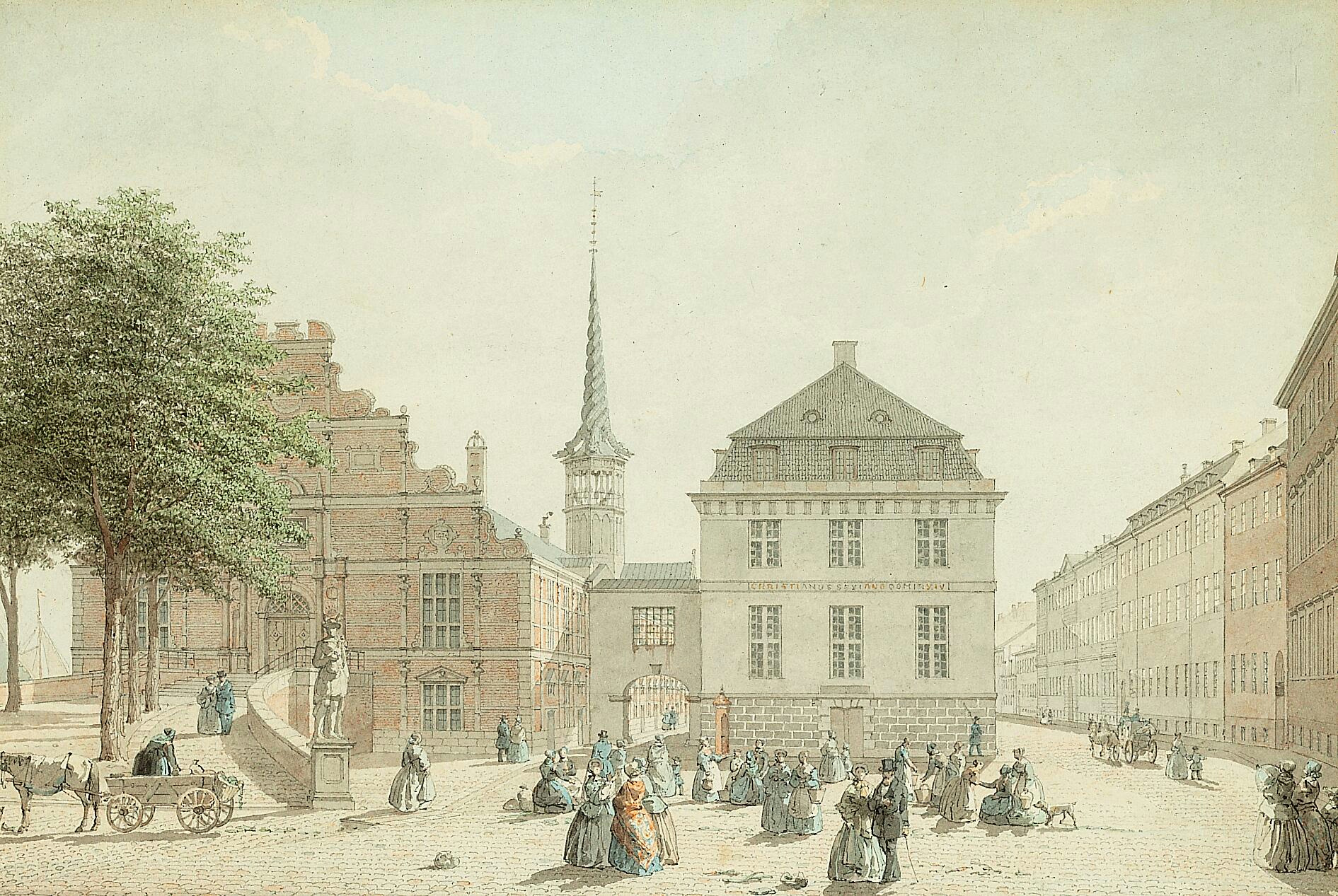
The residence of the bank Kurantbanken, which closed in 1813

The Kurantbanken (also known as the københavnske Assignationsbanken, Vekselbanken or Laanebankbanken) was a Danish-Norwegian private limited company set up in Copenhagen in 1736, when it received its royal oktroj or charter. This charter gave it the right to issue banknotes as legal tender for the state (but not for other citizens) - these notes were to be fully convertible (for silver coin). This made it the first Danish bank. In 1773 the bank was nationalized by the shareholders who received the bonds instead of shares. Heinrich Carl von Schimmelmann was often consulted in financial matters. One result of this was the nationalization of the Bank of Copenhagen in March 1773, which came under the Tax Board, and thus under Schimmelmann's personal leadership.

== See also ==
- List of banks in Denmark
