= Store Kannikestræde =

Street in Copenhagen, Denmark

Coordinates: 55.6803°N 12.5742°E

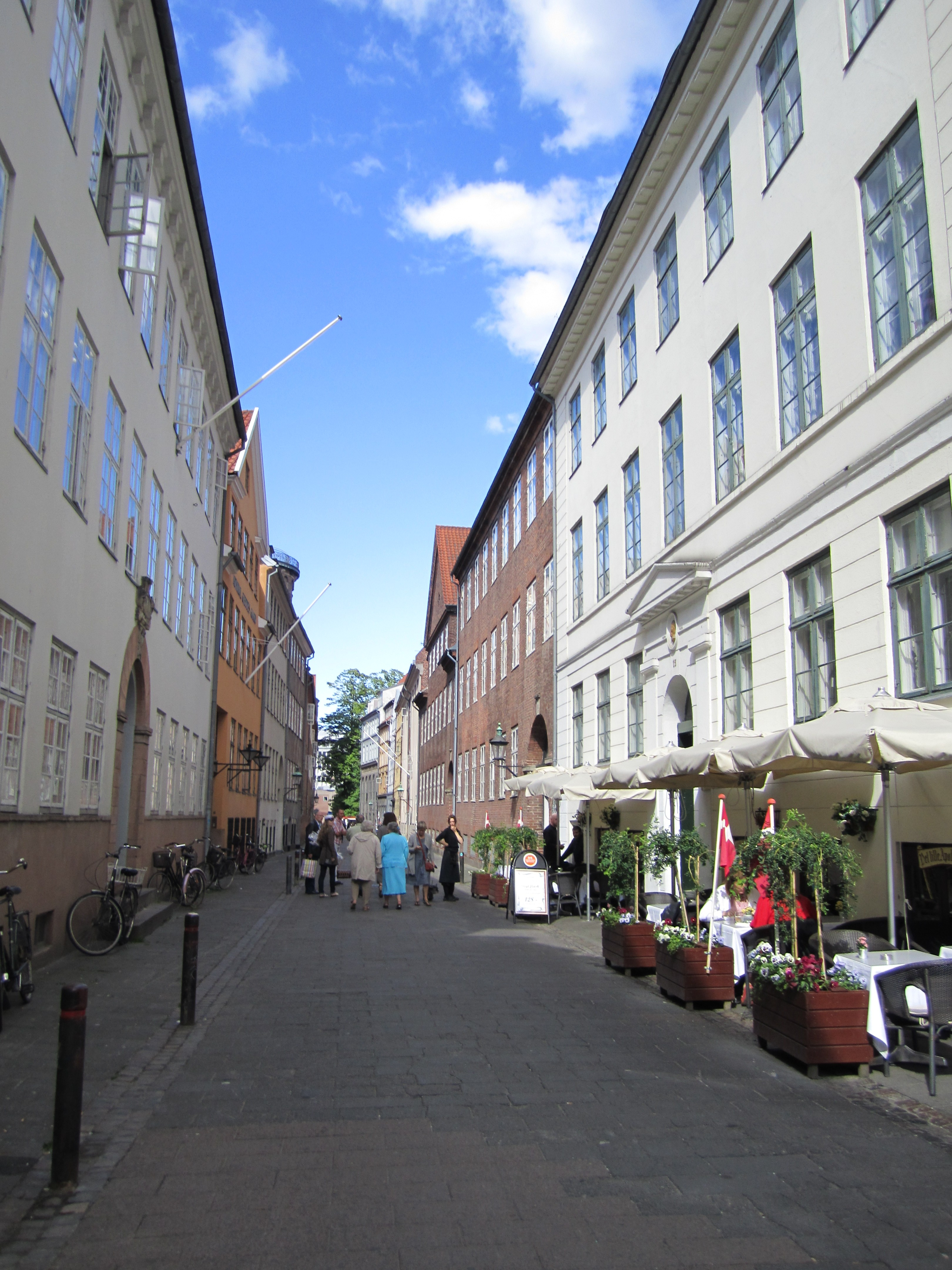
Elers Kollegium

Store Kannikestræde is a street in the Old Town of Copenhagen, Denmark, connecting Frue Plads to Købmagergade. Its history is closely associated with the University of Copenhagen and some of Copenhagen's oldest halls of residence are located in the street. It has been pedestrianized since 1973.

Lille Kannikestræde is a short side street which extends from the south side of Store Kannikestræde, connecting it to Skindergade.

== History ==
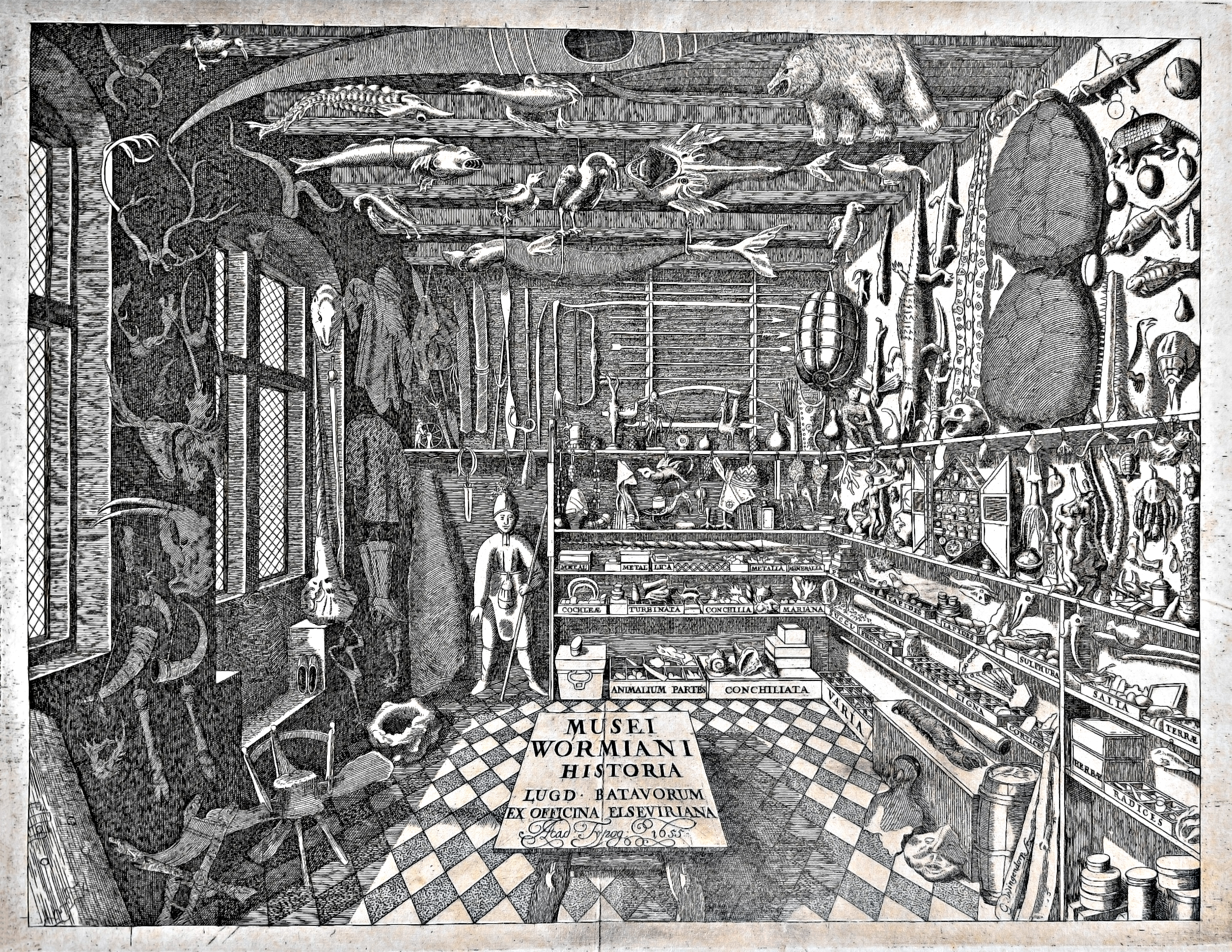
"Musei Wormiani Historia," the frontispiece from the Museum Wormianum depicting Wormius' cabinet of curiosities.

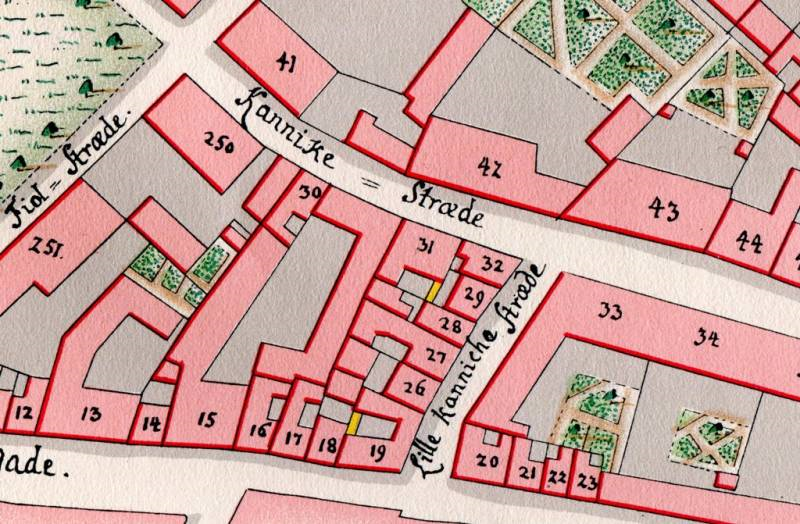
Detail showing Store and Lille Kannikestræde on Gedde's map of the neighbourhood from 1757

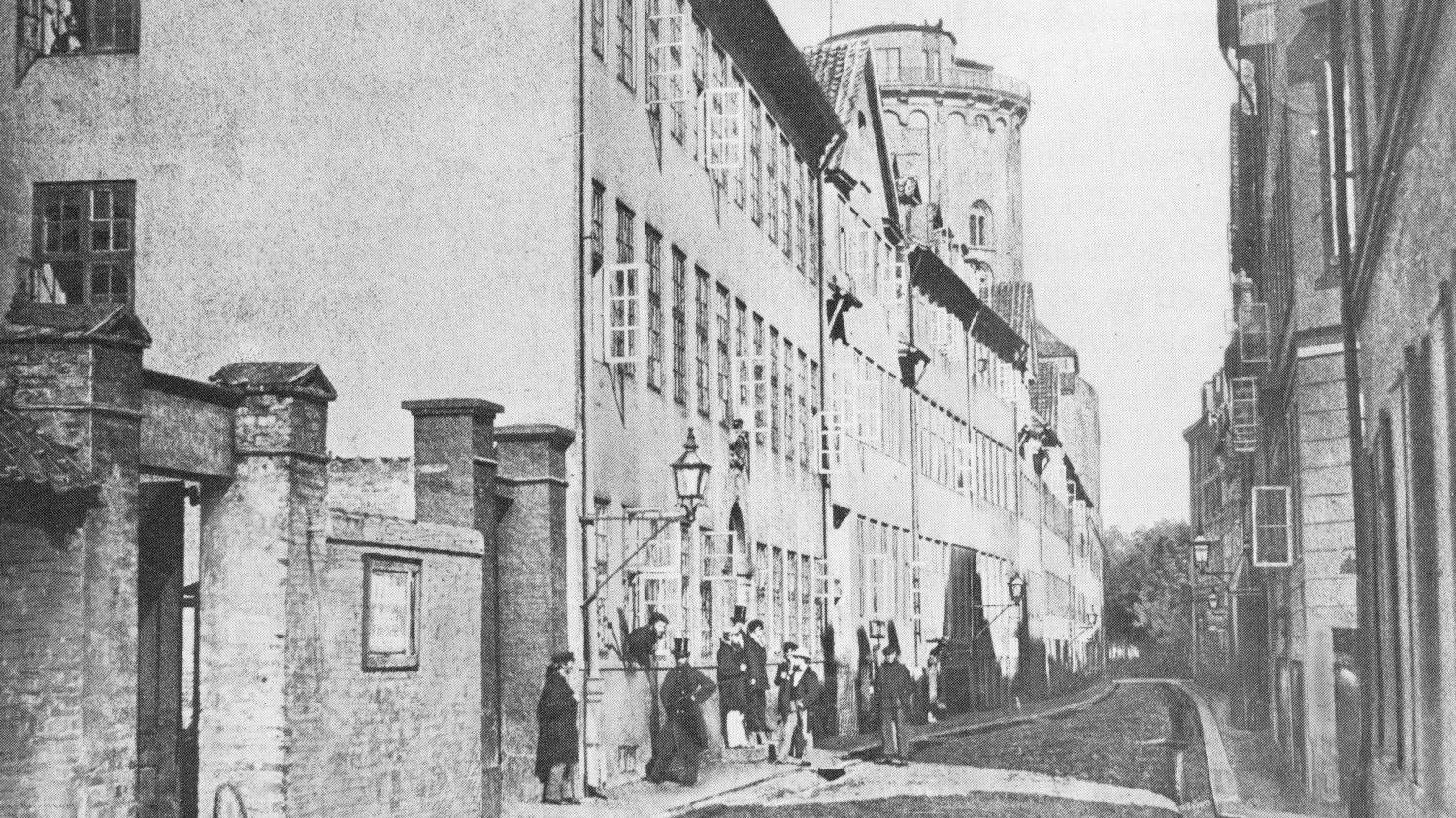
Store Kannikestræde in 1862

Kannik is derived from canonicus. The street takes its name after the eight canons associated with Church of Our Lady.

After the Reformation, University of Copenhagen took over the Roskilde bishops' premises north of the church (now known as the University Quadrangle). The houses in Store Kannikestræde were used as residences for professors at the university. Ole Worm who lived with his family on the corner of Store Kannikestræde and Fiolstræde established a museum of curiosities in his home.

In the early 18th century the university had a total of 11 residences for professors in the street. They were all destroyed along with the other houses in the street in the Copenhagen Fire of 1728. Five of them were rebuilt in 1735 while the other six were not rebuilt until the 1750s. The houses were all designed by Joachim Frederik Ramus, professor in mathematics. They were of considerable size and each contained a single residence, demonstrating the high social status of the professors at the time.

The street was pedestrianized on 23 May 1973 along with Købmagergade and Rosengården.

== Notable buildings and residents ==
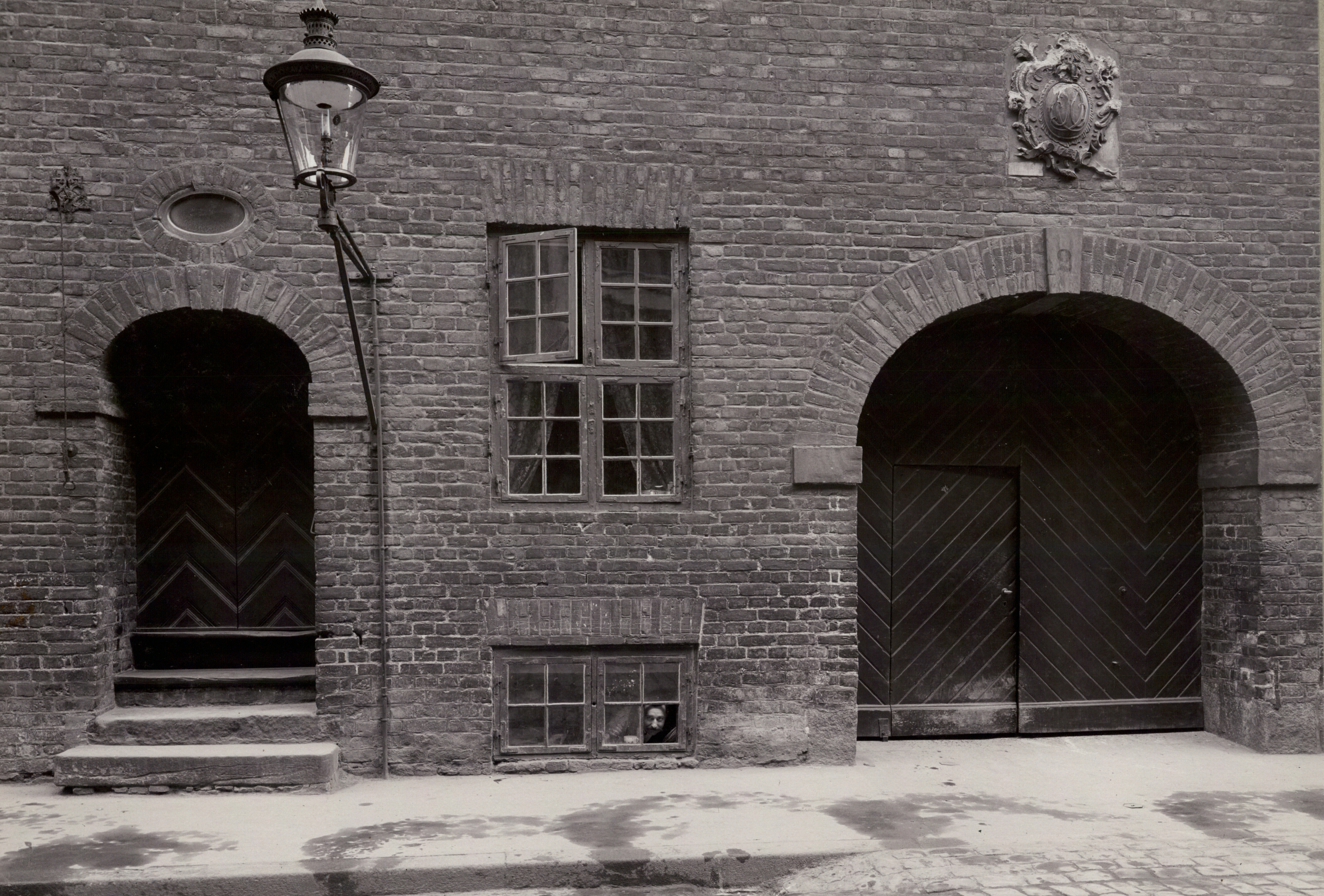
Regensen's entrance on Store Kannikestræde

Three of the oldest halls of residence in Copenhagen are located in the street. Regensen was founded by Christian IV, although only the two lower floors of the section to the east of the gate in Store Kannikestræde date from the original building of 1623. The section west of the gate was destroyed in the fire of 1728 but rebuilt in 1749. The third floor was added in 1777.

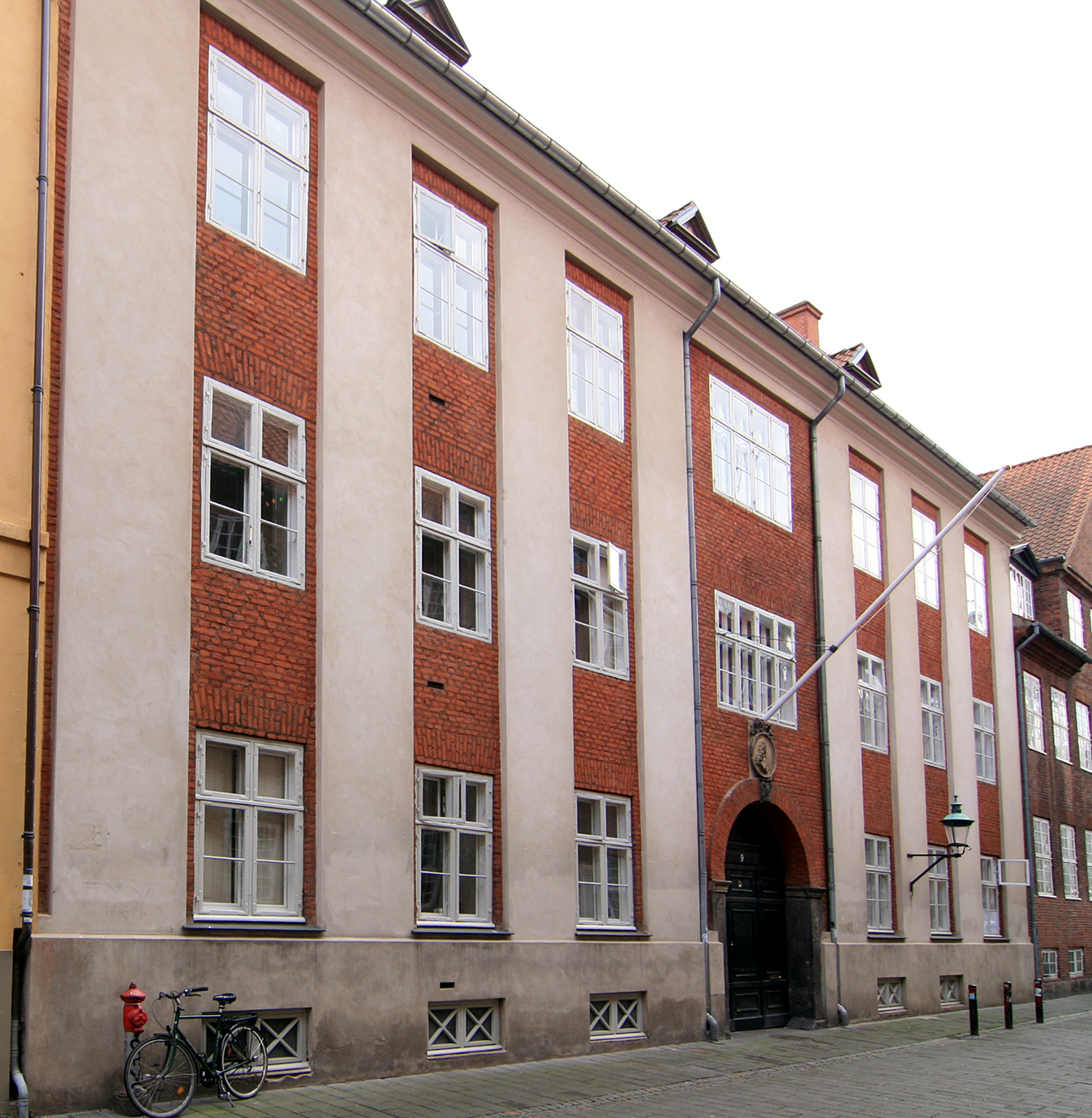
No. 9: Elers Kollegium

Elers Kollegium (No. 9) was built in 1705 to a design by royal building master Johan Conrad Ernst. Its interior was destroyed by the fire in 1728 but restored by Johan Cornelius Krieger in 1730. Borchs Kollegium (No. 12) was destroyed by fire both in 1728 and 1807. The current building was completed in 1825 to a design by Peder Malling who also designed the university's main building on Frue Plads.

Det Lille Apotek (No. 15) was established in 1720, making it the oldest restaurant in Copenhagen. The location specializes in Danish cuisine. The restaurant was frequented by prominent Danish authors and poets, such as Hans Christian Andersen and Peter Faber.

Professorgården (No. 11) was built in 1753 as residences for professors. Admiral Gjeddes Gård (No. 10) on the other side of the street was built in the 1730s and is now used as an event venue.

Other listed buildings in the street include No. 6, No. 8 (1730s), No. 11, No. 13 and No. 15 (1829).

Completed in 1920 to design by Arthur Wittmaack and Vilhelm Hvalsøe, the building at No. 19 is the former headquarters of Danish YWCA. The limestone frieze with Biblical motifs was created by the sculptor Axel Poulsen.

=== Lille Kannikestræde ===
Krigsråd Mørks Minde, located around the corner at Lille Kannikestræde 4, was built in 1831 by Aagaard and was in 1865 converted into charitable housing foundation by 1865 af Emilie Mørk in memory of her husband. The low complex on the other side of the street at Lille Kannikestræde 1–3 is also listed. It consists of a two-storey building from 1862 and a one-storey building from 1865 facing the street and a building from 1814 in the courtyard on the rear.

== Memorials ==
On the façade of No. 19 is a plaque commemorating Ernst Henrich Berling, founder of Berlingske, whose printing business was founded at the site in 1734. Above the main entrance of No. 15 is a gilded relief, portraying Peter Faber, who lived in the building from 1845.

== See also ==
- Kalkeballen
