= Elers' Kollegium =

Student residence in Copenhagen, Denmark

Coordinates: 55°40′50.50″N 12°34′31.56″E

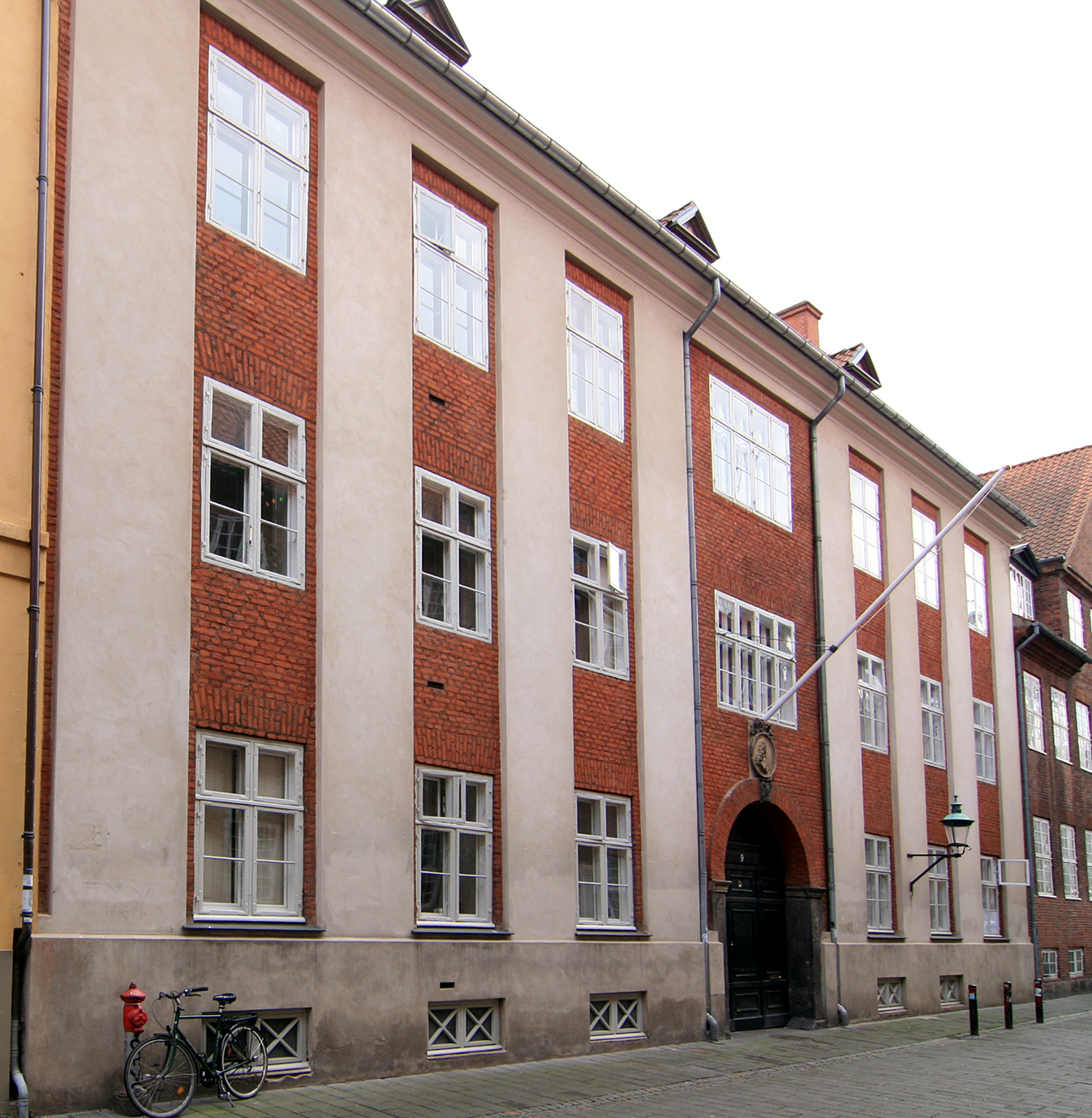
Front of the building

Elers' Kollegium is a student residence located in the medieval part of Copenhagen. The dormitory or society provides living quarters for 20 students from the University of Copenhagen or from the Technical University of Denmark. The dormitory is one of five small dormitories referred to as the old dormitories. They are partially administered by the University of Copenhagen, and only students who have passed at least two years of studies are considered for admission. It is an academic honor to be a member of these dormitories.

It was founded on November 29, 1691, by Councilor of State Jørgen Elers (1647–1692), having lost his last two children in the theater fire in 1689. The building was inaugurated in 1705, and had to be reconstructed after the great fire in 1728.
