= Luxdorph =

Luxdorph is a surname of Danish origin. Notable individuals with the surname include:

- Bolle Luxdorph (1643–1698), Danish civil servant
- Bolle Willum Luxdorph (1716–1788), Danish civil servant and antiquarian
- Peder Luxdorph (1648–1702), Danish judge
