= Sørup, Ringsted Municipality =

Manor house near Rinsted, Denmark

Sørup
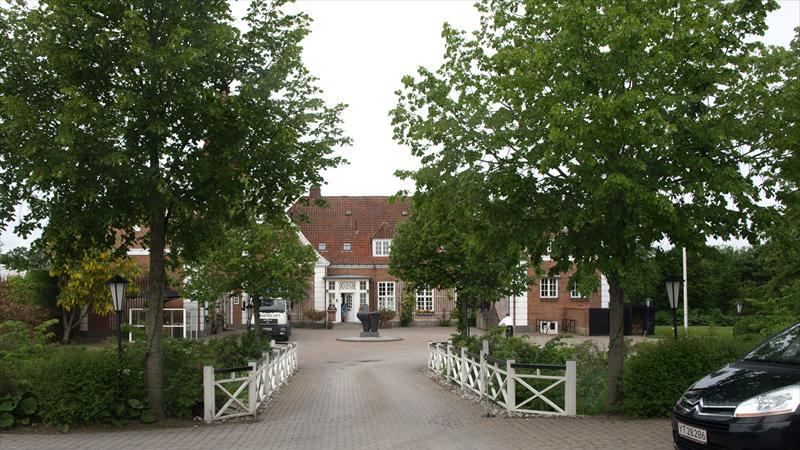
- Interactive map of the Sørup area

General information
- Location: Sørupvej 26; 4100 Ringsted, Denmark
- Coordinates: 55°23′10″N 11°47′41″E
- Completed: 1861

Sørup is a manor house and estate located 6 kilometres south of Ringsted, Denmark. The current Historicist main building was constructed after a fire in 1909 to designs by the architect Gotfred Tvede. It is now operated as a hotel and conference centre.

== History ==
=== Early history ===
Sørup was probably founded as a manor in the 13th century from land that had previously belonged to the small village of Siøthorp. The first known owner was Jacob Nielsen, who is mentioned as the owner in documents from 1381 and 1388. In 1398, it was sold by Peder Jensen Sparre to Torben Pedersen. The owner was in 1419 Karl Nielsen Sørup and in 1425 it was owned by Jacob Jep Jensen. His two sons, Jens and Per Ibsen Jepsen, inherited the estate after their father's death.

=== Basse and Grabow fanilies, 1656–1672 ===
In 1456, Sørup was acquired by Christoffer Jensen Basse. In 1584, Peder Basse married Sophie Nielsdatter Parsberg. He was from 1598 granted a number of fiefs in both Denmark and Norway. During the Kalmar War, in 1611–1613, he served in the cavalry with rank of ritmester. He was also active in the management of his estate. He obtained the Christian IV's permission to close down the rest of the village of Sørup and place the land directly under the manor.

None of Basse's sons survived him. He died as the last male member of the Basse family in 1639. Sørøp was therefore passed to his daughters.

Kjøn Jochum Grabow, whose wife Anne Steensen had inherited a stake of the estate from her mother, Margrethe Basse, had by 1642 acquired most of the stakes in the estate. Grabow had served in the Danish-Norwegian Navy during both the Torstenson War (1643–1645) and in the First and second Dano-Swedish Wars, first as commander of a whole eskadre.

=== Bolle Luxdorph and the Knuth family ===
Grabow's widow sold Sørup to Bolle Luxdorph in 1672. He also purchased the remaining shares in the estate from the other owners. Bolle Luxdorph was also the owner of a number of others estate. He had close ties to Peder Griffenfeld. His career in the central administration survived Griffenfeld's fall, In 1679, he was ennobled. In 1690, he fell out of facour at Christian V's court and was dismissed from all his offices.

Luxdorph left Sørup and several other of his estates to his son-in-law, Adam Christopher Knuth. In 1714, Adam Christopher Knuth was able to merge his estate into a countship under the name Knuthenborg.

Im 1743, Knuth and his second wife, Ida Margrethe. established the Barony of Conradsborg for their youngest son, Conrad Ditlev Knuth. It consisted of the family's domains on Zealand: Sørup, Sandbygaard and Rosengaard.

=== 19th century ===
In 1797, Conrad Ditlev Knuth was granted royal permission to dissolve the barony and replace it by a family trust (Fideicommissum). Sørup was sold in public auction to Jens Dahl. Dahl improved the management of the estate.

In 1813, Dahl sold Sørup to Heinrich Callisen. He managed to keep the estate in spite of the agricultural crisis that made many other landowners go bankrupt. In 1828, Sørup was acquired by Thor Muus. Muus' son, W.H. Muus, inherited Sørup after his father's death in 1881. He had already managed the estate since 1869.

=== 20th century ===
In 1897, W.H. Muus' widow sold Sørup to count Frederik Brockenhuus-Schack. The main building was destroyed by fire in 1909. The architect Gotfred Tvede was subsequently charged with the design of a new man building.

In 1918, Brockenhuus-Schack sold Sørup to P. Madelung. Later in the same year, Madelung sold it to Justus Ulrich.

== Today ==
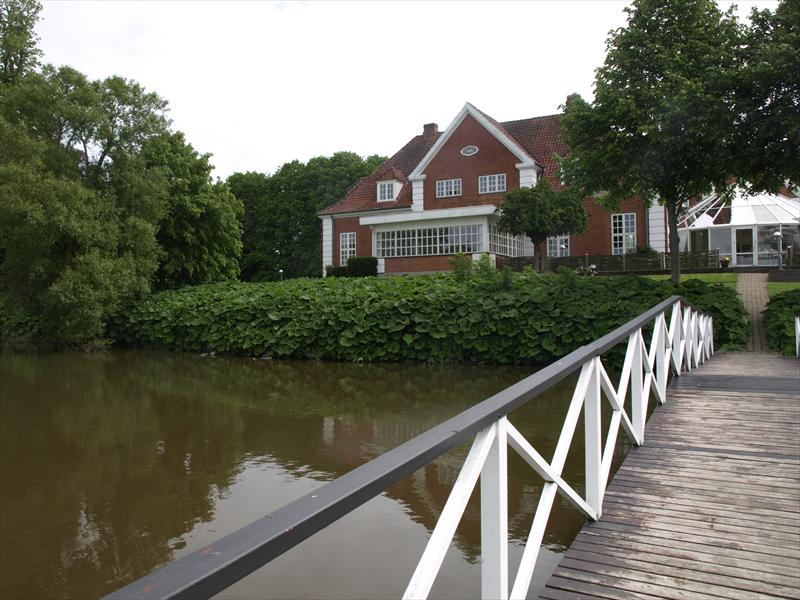
Særup.

Sørup is as of 2020 owned by Lene Christiansen via the company Sørup Avlsgård A/S. The main building is operated as a hotel and conference centre.

== List of owners ==
- (1381–1388) Jacob Nielsen
- (1398) Peder Jensen Sparre
- (1398) Torben Pedersen
- (1419) Karl Nielsen Gris
- (1425- ) Jacob Jep Jensen
- (1453–1456) Jens Ibsen Jepsen
- (1453–1456) Per Ibsen Jepsen
- (1456–1494) Christoffer Jensen Basse
- (1494–1560) Basse Christoffersen
- (1560- ) Christoffer Basse
- ( -1582) Erik Basse
- (1582–1639) Peder Basse
- ( -1667) Kjøn Jochum Grabow
- (1667–1672) Anne Steensen, gift Grabow
- (1672–1698) Bolle Luxdorph
- (1698–1712) Amalie Adeler
- (1712–1713) Hedevig Ulrikke Luxdorph, married Knuth
- (1713–1736) Adam Christopher Knuth
- (1736–1743) Ida Margrethe Reventlow, gift Knuth
- (1743–1797) Conrad Ditlev Knuth
- (1797–1813) Jens Dahl
- (1813–1828) Heinrich Callisen
- (1828–1880) Thor Muus
- (1880–1907) W.H. Muus
- (1907) Enken efter W.H. Muus
- (1907–1918) Frederik greve Brockenhuus-Schack
- (1918) P. Madelung
- (1918–1923) Justus Ulrich
- (1923–1947) W. Harrsen
- (1947–1949) Boet efter W. Harrsen
- (1949–1981) A/S Sørup
- -present) Sørup Avlsgård A/S
