= Mørup =

Manor house near Sorø, Denmark

- Interactive map of the Mørup area

General information
- Location: Mørupvej 1; 4173 Fjenneslev, Denmark
- Coordinates: 55°27′17″N 11°40′19″E

Mørup is a manor house and estate located close to Sorø, Denmark. It is now owned by Sorø Academy The half-timbered main building dates from the beginning of the 19th century.

== History ==
In the late 16th century Nørup was a copyhold under Sorø Abbey which after the Reformation had been converted into a royal fief. Up through the 17th century it was used as a royal hunting lodge. In 1672, Christian V ceded the estate to Ulrik Christian Gyldenløve. In 1678, he ceded it to Frederik Gabel. He was already the owner of Bavelse og Bregentved.

In 1686, Gabel sold it to Niels Christoffersen. After his death, his heirs sold it to Christian Bonorden, who shortly thereafter sold it to Johan Haxen, a civil servant and veteran from the Scanian War. Haxen's widow married Niels Fogh who then owned the estate until it was sold in auction in 1710,

Im 1716, Mørdrup was acquired by Christian Luxdorph. Luxdorph, a son of Bolle Luxdorph, was a colonel in the infantry. He died just 42years old in 1736, leaving a wife, Susanne Magdalene Worm, and their 10-year-old son, Bolle Willum Luxdorph. Bolle Willum Luxdorph inherited the farm after his mother's death in 1735. The farm was destroyed by fire in 1743 and Luxdorph chose to sell it in 1748. The new owner was Laurs Biørn. He sold it to Holger Skeel om 1755.

In 1772, Skeel's widow sold it to Eggert Christoffer Knuth, count of Knuthenborg and Gyldensten and occupant of Lerchenfeldt. Knuth converted Mørup into a Fee tail (Danish: Stamhus). After his death in 1776 it was passed on to his sonm Henrik Knuth. He had no children and was therefore succeeded by his half-brother, Frederik Knuth. In 1803. the fee tail was dissolved. Mørup was then sold to Iver Ammitsböll. His widow Dorothea Elisabeth married the estate's tutor, Peter Diderik Ibsen. In 1825, Ibsen obtained a position as parish priest on Funen and Mørup was then sold in auction. The buyer was Sorø Academy. The estate was then used as the academy's Department of Agriculture and Forestry. It welcomed the first students in 1830. The department closed again in 1935.

== Architecture ==
Mørup is a three-winged complex dating from the beginning of the 19th century. The main wing (east wing) is a half-timbered building a gabled median risalit9. The roof is composed of red tile.

== Today ==
Mørup is still owned by Sorø Academy. The estate covers 268 hectares. Mørup Skov was originally part of the estate. It is also owned by Sorø Academy.

== List of owners ==
- (1672-1678) Ulrik Frederik Gyldenløve
- (1678-1686) Frederik Christoffersen Gabel
- (1686-1695) Niels Christoffersen
- (1695-1698) Frantz Christian Bonorden
- (1698-1704) Johan Haxsen
- ( -1710) Niels Fogh
- (1710-1711) Mads Nielsen Lind
- (1711-1716) Otto Korff
- (1716-1726) Christian Luxdorph
- (1726-1735) Susanne Magdalene Worm, gift Luxdorph
- (1735-1748) Bolle Willum Luxdorph
- (1748-1755) Laurs Biørn
- (1755-1764) Holger Skeel
- (1764-1772) Regitze Sophie Güldencrone, gift Skeel
- (1772-1776) Eggert Christoffer Knuth
- (1776-1802) Johan Henrik Knuth
- (1802-1803) Frederik Knuth
- (1803-1816) Iver Ammitzböll
- (1816-1817) Dorothea Elisabeth Falckenthal, gift 1) Ammitzböll, 2) Ibsen
- (1817-1825) Peter Diderik Ibsen
- (1825- ) Stiftelsen Sorø Akademi
