= Kronprinsessegade 22–24 =

Listed building in Copenhagen

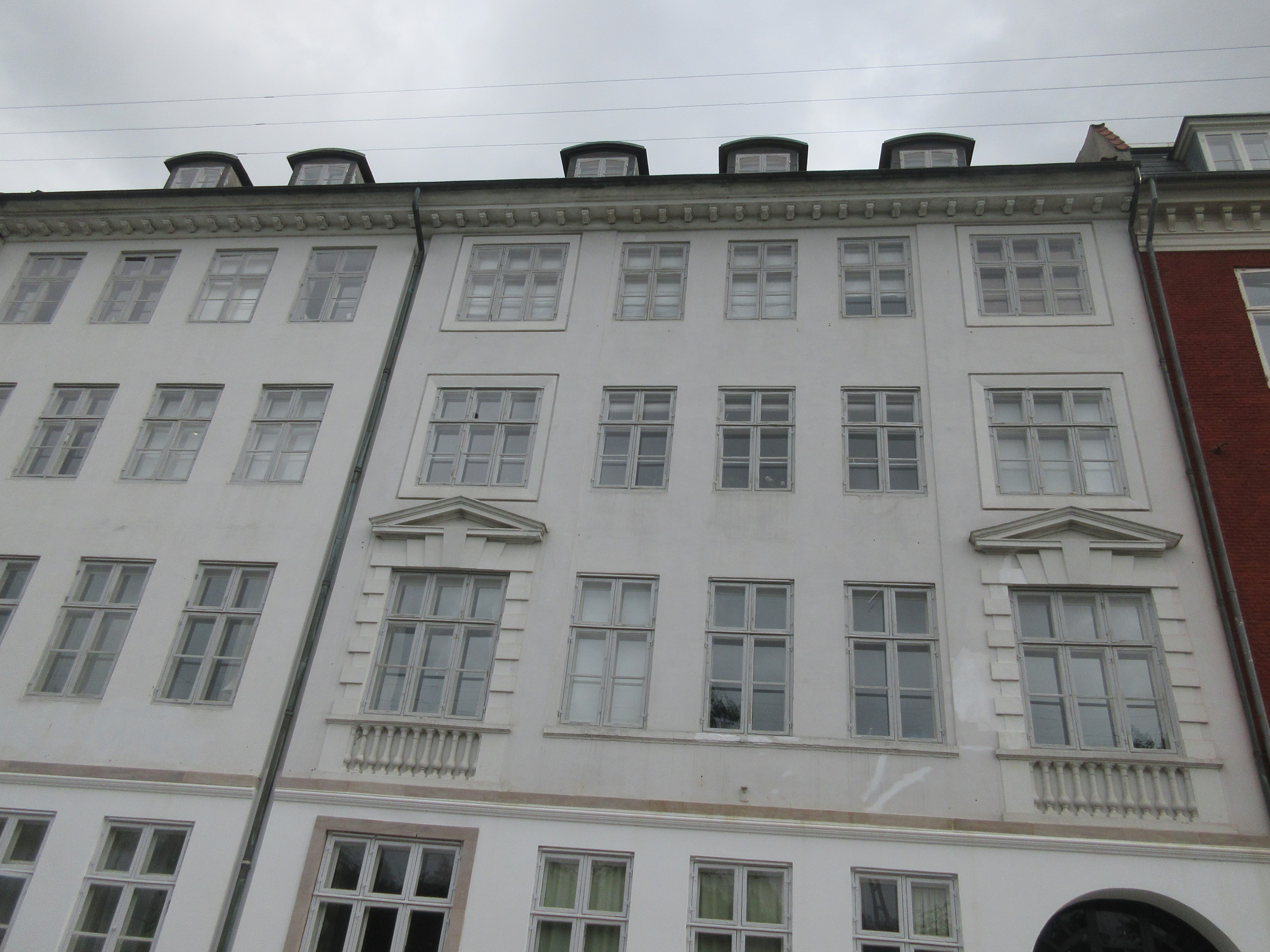
- Interactive map of the Kronprinsessegade 22–24 area

General information
- Location: Copenhagen, Denmark
- Coordinates: 55°41′1.9″N 12°34′54.91″E
- Completed: 1807-08

Kronprinsessegade 22–24 are two Neoclassical apartment buildings overlooking Rosenborg Castle Gardens in central Copenhagen, Denmark. They were both constructed by master mason A. C. Wilcken (ca.1760-1816) to designs by Andreas Hallander in 1807–1808. They were listed on the Danish registry of protected buildings and places in 1918 (No. 22) and 1945 (No. 24). Notable former residents include the theologian and politician Henrik Nicolai Clausen (1793–1877), judge Frederik Lütken (1808–1879) and physician Varl Lange. The latter operated a medical clinic at No. 22 from 1878 until his death in 1900.

== History ==
=== Construction ===
The property was initially referred to as Lot No. 20 A when Kronprinsessegade was created. It was listed in the new cadastre of 1806 as No. 393 in St. Ann's West Quarter. The present buildings on the site were constructed by A. C. Wilcken in 1807–08. On their completion in 1808, the two buildings were divided into separate properties as No. 393 A and No. 393 B.

=== 1808–1830 ===
The theologian Henrik Nicolai Clausen (1793–1877) resided at No. 22 in 1822.

=== 1834 and 1840 census ===
Director of Copenhagen's Poor Authority Christian Sigfred Mangor resided in the second-floor apartment at the 1834 census. He lived there with his daughter Marie Mangor and two maids.

The military officer Oluf Krabbe (1789–1864) resided first at No. 22 and then No. 24 from around 1833 to 1842.

No. 303 A was home to 39 residents in five households at the 1840 census. Christian Sigfred Mangor (1771–1840), director of Copenhagen's Poor Authority and a major in Livjægerkorpset, resided on the third floor with his daughter Marie Mangor and one maid. Oluf Krabbe, a captain in the King's Regiment, resided on the second floor with his wife Charlotte Krabbe (née Schlotfeldt, 1807–1888), their three children (aged four to nine), two lodgers and one maid. Jens Bertelsen (1798–1873), a senior clerk in Rentekammeret, resided on the first floor with his wife Henriette Christiane Bertelsen (née Mulvad, 1804–1870), their nine children (aged two to 14), one male servant and three maids. Anna Sophie Olrik (née Hellsen, 1774–1857), widow of hospital manager and councilman in Helsingør Holger Ludvig Olrik (1769–1724), resided on the ground floor with three unmarried daughters (aged 25 to 41) and a maid. Frederik Lind, a master shoemaker, resided in the basement with his wife Maren Lind (née Tofte), their five children (aged five to 16) and one shoemaker (employee).

Atonius Proschonsky, a master tailor, resided on the ground floor of No. 393 B. He lived there with his wife Maria Agnes Proschonsky (née Firmenich), their two children (aged one and three), a maid and an apprentice. Anne Marie Schlotfeldt (née Dixen, 1788–1852), widow of customs officers in Aalborg Rasmus Schlotfeldt (1768–1825) and Oluf Krabbe's mother-on-law, resided on the second floor with her son Julius Theodor Schlotfeldt and one maid. Peder Rasmussen, a workman at the Porcelain Factory, resided in the basement with his wife Marie Kirstine Rasmussen (née Sanberg), their two children (aged 10 and 24) and one lodger (musician).

=== Schoubye and Lútken ===
Andreas Schoubye, a former court scribe (hofskriver) and the owner of the building, resided on the first floor with his wife Cathrine Spiir and their three children (aged 16 to 21). Frederik Lütken (1808–1879), a government official in Danske Kancelli, resided on the second floor with his three sons (aged two to six). Wilhelm August Gotlieb Hindenburg, an army captain in the 7th Battalion, resided on the third floor with his wife, their two children (aged six and ten) and one maid. Anna Sophie Olrik still resided on the ground floor with two of her daughters and one maid. Niels Madsen, a new master shoemaker, resided in the basement with his wife, a foster son and an apprentice.

The first floor of No. 303 N was also occupied by Schoubue. Augusta Charlotte Prætorius, a 20-year-old woman, resided on the second floor of No. 393 B. Sophie Ermegaard Møller, an unmarried woman with a pension, resided on the third floor. Anne Marie Beck, a maid, was listed as the only resident on the ground floor.

Anne Margrethe Olsen, a nine-year-old girl, listed as "daughter", without further specifications, is the only person listed as a resident of the basement at No. 393 N.

Frederik Lütken's first wife Golla Andriette Mathilde Krogstad (1818–43) died in 1843. One of his sons was the later author, translator and consul André Lütken. In 1846 he was married to his landlord Andreas Schoubue's daughter Olivia Maria Schoubye (1824–48). In April 1948, she gave birth to their son William Frederik Lütken, She died in 1848, possibly during labour with their second child, a daughter, Olivia, who was alive in early 1850 but did not surve childhood.

Frederik Lütken still resided in the second-floor apartment at the 1850 census. He lived there with his four children, a housekeeper and a maid.

=== Carl Lange and Klokken ===
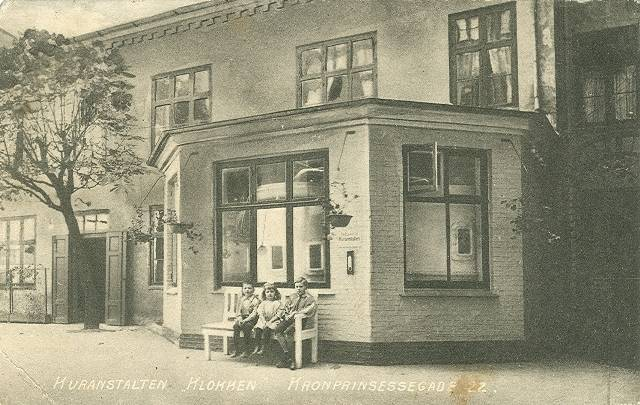
Lange's clinic Klokken.

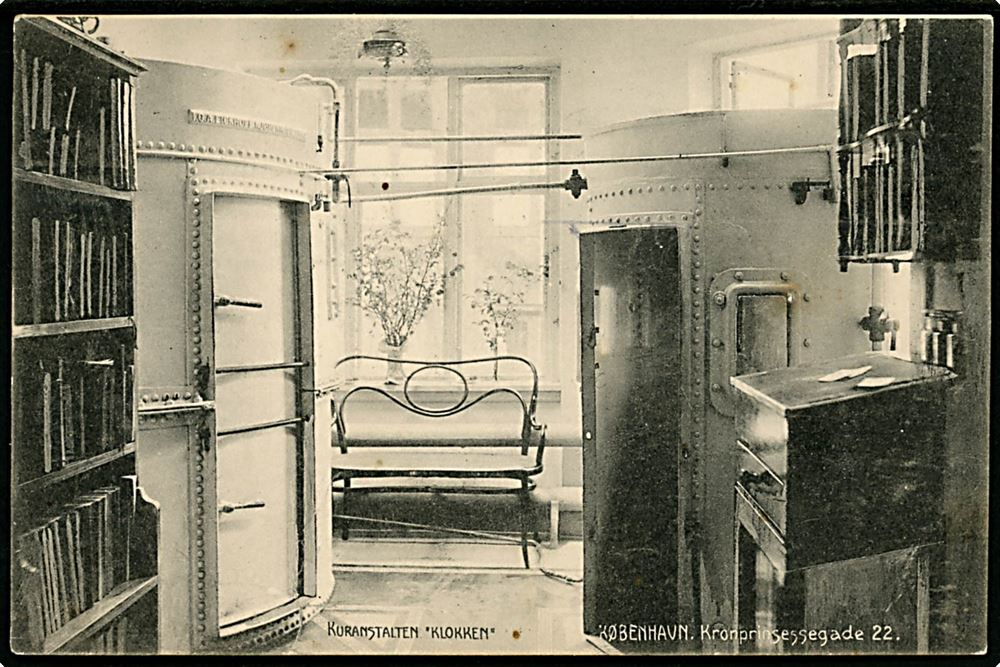
Interior from Lange's clinic Læokken: The two chambers ("bells") in which patients received treatment.

In c. 1766, Kronprinsessegade 22 was acquired by the physician Carl Lange. In 1878, Kronprinsessegade 22 and Kronprinsessegade 24 were formally merged into a single property. In 1878, Lange's medical clinic Klokken was moved to the building in 1878.Rstablished by Lange in 1863, it had until then been located in a building next to Kongens Store Mølle on Copenhagen Western Rampart. It treated patients with bronchitis, astma and lung emphysema. Lange's private home was also located in the building until his death in 1890.

=== 20th century ===
Olafur Halldommen, an Icelandic civil servant, resided in one of the apartments at the 1906 census.

Johann Haastrup & Søn, a plumber's business, was later based in the building.

== Architecture ==
Kronprinsessegade 22 is a five bays wide building constructed with four stories over a walk-out basement. The facade features a narrow cornice band above the ground floor and a dentillated cornice. The three central bays are slightly recessed on the three upper floors. The outer first-floor windows are accented with triangular pediments, rectangular depressions with blind ballusters beneath them and shadow joints along their sides. A green-painted gate topped by a fanlight is located in the bay furthest to the south. A rounded installation on the dentillated transom may once have featured a clock face. Access to the building's principal staircase is through a door situated in a deep barrel-vaulted niche in the northern wall of the gateway. The basement entrance is also located in the gateway. The pitched roof is clad in red tiles. It features three copper-clad dormer windows overlooking the park on the other side of the street.

Kronprinsessegade 24 is also constructed with four stories over a walk-out basement but is just four bays wide. The facade features a cornice band above the ground floor and a dentillated cornice but has no other decorative details. The main entrance is located in the bay furthest to the north.

== Today ==
As of 2008, Kronprinsessegade 22–24 belonged to Poul Johan Mogens Tvermoes.
