= Tetz Rosengaard =

Tetz (Totzen) Rosengaard (died 1476) was a Danish cleric and statesman. He served as archdeacon at Roskilde Cathedral from 1440. From 1443 to 1453, under the reign of Christian I of Denmark, he also served as Royal Chancellor (Kongens Kansler). He was fiefholder of Selsø in Hornsherred.

== Biography ==
Rosengaard belonged to a branch of the Rügen noble family Schlaweke that had settled on Zealand. He was the son of Tetz Rosengaard til Kværkeby (died c.1420) and Tale Jensdatter Qvitzow. The name Rosengaard stems from the manor of Rosengartenon on Rügen. The name was later transferred to their Zealand fief Kværkeby as Rosengaard. Many members of the Danish branch of the family were high-ranking clergymen or government officials. His brother Jens Tetzen was a knight.

Tetz Rosengaard was a canon at Roskilde Cathedral from at least 1442. He was a deacon at the cathedral by 1447 and archdeacon (ærkedegn) from 1450.

In 1455–57, he served as Royal Chancellor. He seems to have accompanied Christian I to negotiations in Rostock in 1456. He had a reputation for being ill-tempered and ruthless. He was involved in a controversy with Bishop Oluf Daa concerning the archdeacon's jurisdiction. He maintained a better relationship with Daa's successor Oluf Mortensen Baden. He was responsible for the administration of the bishop's fief Selsø for a time, and was also here involved in a dispute with his neighbor, Peder Bille of Svanholm.
