= Knuthenlund =

Manor house in Lolland Municipality, Denmark

Knuthenlund is a biodynamic agricultural estate on the island of Lolland in southeastern Denmark. The estate has an area of 960 hectares. It is known for its goat and sheep milk cheeses. Knuthenlund also produces a range of other food products which are sold through Irma stores as well as to Michelin-starred restaurants in Denmark and abroad.

== History ==
Knuthenlund was established in 1729 by Count Adam Christopher Knuth who had already inherited Knuthenborg from his father in 1714. The new estate was created by merging the land that had previously belonged to the five tenant farms in the village of Brekorpes as well as Ugleholt Forest and various other properties in the area.

In 1738, Knuthenlund was merged into Knuthenborg. It happened at the initiative of Knuth's widow, Ida Margrethe Reventlow, who had obtained royal permission to rearrange the Knuth family's holdings on behalf of their sons. As a farm under Knuthenborgt, Knuthenlund was then managed by a tenant, usually for a ten-year period at a time. From the 1870s, Knuthenlund focused on dairy products as a result of growing demand from the English and American markets. The buildings were replaced from 1877 to 1886.

In 1913, Knuthenlund and nearby Bøllesminde were sold to dairy owner Jens Peter Herman Hansen, who later that same year sold off Bøllesminde.

== Today ==
The current owner, Susanne Hovmand-Simonsen, fourth generation at Knuthenlund, took over Knuthenlund after her father in 2006 and also owns the adjacent estate Ørbygård. She has turned the estate into one of Denmark's largest organic farm. The estate has an area of 960 hectares.

== Food products ==
Knuthenlund is especially known for its goat and sheep milk cheeses. Its dairy opened in 2009 and has received multiple awards at the World Cheese Awards, Nordic Cheese Competition and Premio Roma. It received an honorary diploma from the Danish Gastronomic Academy in 2009 and became a member of the Guilde de Fromager in 2011. The dairy also produces milk and yogurt.

Knuthenlund also keeps traditional Danish livestock breeds such as Danish Red cattle and Black and White Danish Landrace pigs. The estate produces organic meat from free-ranging animals (beef, lamb and pork), saussures and charcuterie.

A new flour mill opened on the estate in 2016. It produces flour from spelt and Öland wheat.

A range of food products are as of 2016 sold through Irma stores. Customers also include Michelin-starred restaurants in Denmark, Belgium and the Netherlands.

== List of owners ==
- 1729–1736: Adam Christopher Knuth
- 1736–1776: Eggert Christopher Knuth
- 1776–1802: Johan Henrich Knuth
- 1802–1818: Frederik Knuth
- 1818–1856: Frederik Marcus Knuth
- 1856–1876: Eggert Christopher Knuth
- 1876–1888: Adam Wilhelm Knuth
- 1888–1913: Eggert Christopher Knuth
- 1913–1938: Jens Peter Herman Hansen
- 1938–1977: Morten Evald Hovmand-Hansen
- 1977–2006: Sten Hovmand-Hansen
- 2006–present: Susanne Hovmand-Simonsen

== See also ==
- Frederiksdal
