= Nybøllegård =

Nybøllegård may refer to:

- Nybøllegård, Funen, a manor house on Funen, Denmark
- Nybøllegård, Møn, a house on Møn, Denmark
