= Frederik Christian Eilschov =

Danish philosopher (1725–1750)

Frederik Christian Eilschov (13 February 1725 – 15 October 1750) was a Danish philosopher. He is most noted for Fruentimmer-Philosophie (1749) and for Philosophiske Breve (1748).

Eilschov was born at Rynkeby on the island of Funen. He was the son of parish priest Laurids Christian Eilschou (1695-1764) and Cathrine Munderlov (1690-1766). In 1742 he became he began his education and 1746 he took received his master's degree from the University of Copenhagen. He resided at Borchs Kollegium for the remainder of his life. Eilschov died at the age of 25 of smallpox and was buried in the cemetery at Trinitatis Church in Copenhagen.

== Works ==
- Cogitationes de scientiis vernacula lingua docendis cum specimine terminologiae vernaculae, 1747
- Philosophiske Skrifter, 1747
- Philosophiske Breve over adskillige nyttige og vigtige Ting, 1748
- Fruentimmer Philosophie i tre Samtaler, 1749
