= Cornelius Pedersen Lerche =

Danish nobleman and envoy

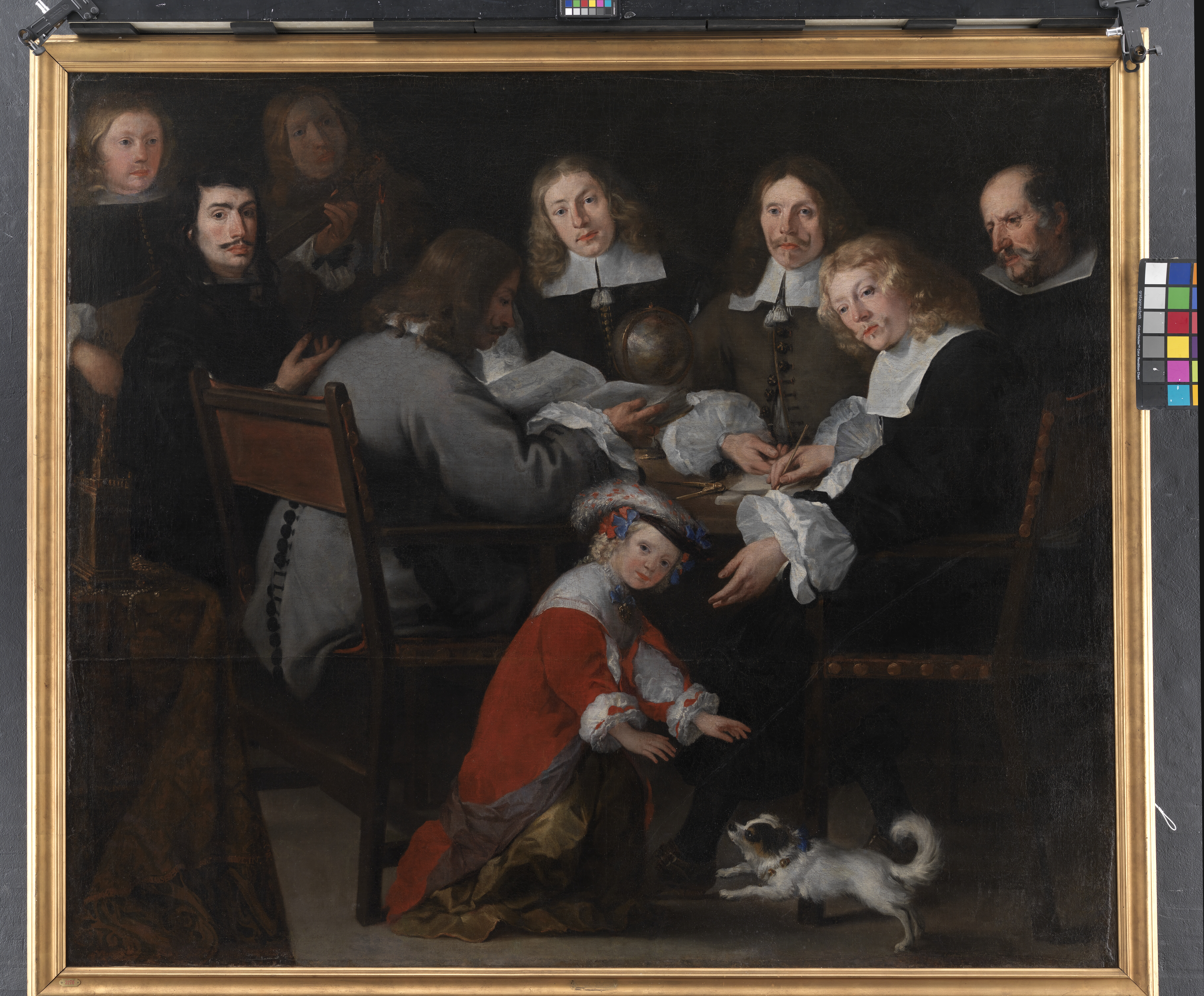
Ambassador Cornelius Pedersen Lerche With His Staff, painted by José Antolínez

Cornelius Pedersen Lerche (31 October 1615 – 3 January 1681) was a Danish nobleman and envoy to the Spanish court.

== Biography ==
Lerche was born on 31 October 1615 to mayor Peder Nielsen and Sidsel Knudsdatter. He assumed the name Lerche. He matriculated from Sorø Latin School in 1633 before continuing his studies abroad.

== Career ==
In 1645, he was employed as secretary in the German Chancellery (Tyske Kancelli) in Copenhagen. In 1650–1653, he was Danish consul (resident) in Madrid. In 1658–62, he was back in Madrid as Danish envoy to the Spanish court. On 6 July 1670, he was appointed as Kancelliraad. On 16 November 1671, now with the title of etatsråd, he was admitted to the Council of State (Statskollegiet) and Supreme Court. On 1 May 1672, he was appointed as county governor of Lolland and Falster. On 5 August 1672, he was also appointed administrator of the dowager queen's "livgedinget". (Note: "Livgedinget" is land given, by a king, to his queen to provide an income should she become widowed.)

== Possessions and ennoblement ==
On 25 June 1660, he was ennobled under the name Lerche. In 1664, he became the owner of Nielstrup on Lolland. In 1667, he also bought Aarsmarke (now Knuthenborg).

== Personal life ==
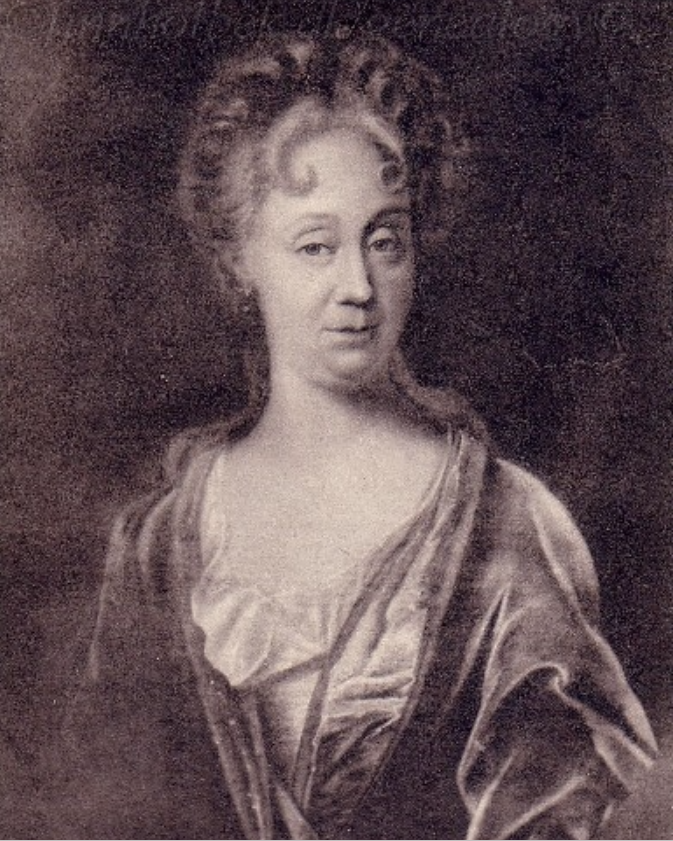
Søster Lerche, Lerche's daughter by his second wife.

On 1 August 1647, he married Søster Fuiren, daughter of the prominent medical doctor Jørgen Fuiren and his wife Margrethe Fincke. She had one son with him, Jørgen Corneliussen Lerche (b. 1648), prior to her early death in 1649. On 1 June 1657, he married Anne Kirstine Friis, the widow of his brother-in-law Diderik Fuiren (1621–1656) and a daughter of the mayor of Copenhagen Henrik Friis. From her first marriage, she was the mother of lensbaron Diderik Fuiren (b. 1656). She had one daughter, Søster Corneliusdatter Lerche. She died in Madrid in 1660. He later married Sidsel Grubbe (1648–1716), daughter of Jacob Knudsen Grubbe and Hilleborg Daa. Grubbe gave birth to a son named Christian Corneliussen Lerche.

Lerche died on 3 January 1681. His widow was later married to colonel Johan Didrich von Wettberg. Nielstrup was passed to his son Christian Cornelius Lerche. He was married twice, first to Marie Amalie Gude and then to Sophie Ulrikke von Reichau. Aarsmarke was passed to the daughter Søster Lerche. She was later married to Eggert Christopher Knuth, progenitor of the Counts of Knuthenborg.
