= Johan Jepsen Ravensberg =

Danish Bishop and Politician

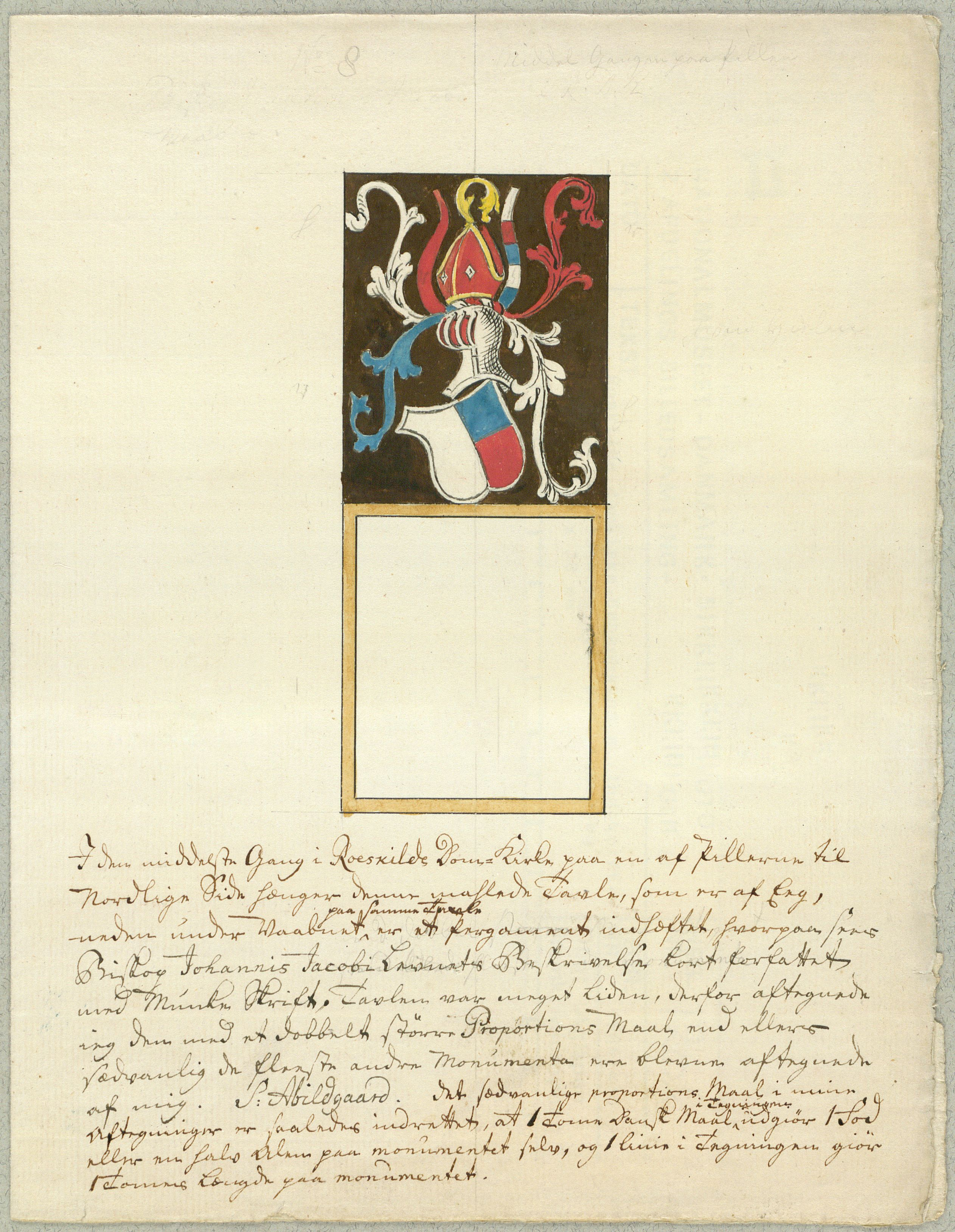
Epitaph commemorating Ravensborg in Roskilde Cathedral. Drawing by Søren Abildgaard.

Johan Jepsen Ravensberg (1452 - 14 April 1512) was a Danish clergyman and statesman. He served as King's Chancellor from 1486 to 1493 and as Bishop of Roskilde from 1500 to 1512.

== Early life and education ==
Ravensberg was born in 1452 to Privy Councillor Jep Jensen Ravensberg (died 1481) and Else Albertsdatter Krag. He was the brother of Privy Councilor Albert Jepsen Ravensberg. His father owned Kindholm at Kyndby near Holbæk and was lensmand of Haraldsborg at Roskilde and Ravnsborg on Lolland. He was sent to Cologne to study when he was 18 years old. He is most likely identical to one Johannes Jacobi de Dacia, who enrolled at the university in Cologne in 1471.

== Eclastical career ==
Ravensberg began his ecclesiastical career as a parish priest on Lolland. He was shortly thereafter appointed as canon in Roskilde and then as archdean (lrkedegn) in Viborg. In 1496, during the reign of John of Denmark, he was appointed as provost (domprovst) of Lund. In 1499, he was appointed as dean of Roskilde. In 1500, he was appointed as Bishop of Roskilde. His status as Bishop of Roskilde was confirmed by the pope in 1501. On 18 February 1512, due to poor health and by agreement with King John, he left the office and was replaced by Lave Urne (1467–1529).

== Politics ==
In 1486–93, Ravensberg served as the King Chancellor (Kongens Kansler) and a member of the Privy Council. In 1492–93, he participated in negotiations in the Netherlands, England and Scotland. In 1502, he was in Norway to assist Henrik Krummedige in the conflict with Knut Alvsson. According to the Skibby Chronicle, he was involved in the assassination of Alvsson. The same source accuses him of having encouraged the assassins of Poul Laxmand to murder him.

== Death and legacy ==
Ravensborg died at Hjortsholm on 14 April 1512. He is buried in the northern side of the central nave of Roskilde Cathedral. Three of the cathedral's bells date from his years as bishop, including the largest of them (stormklokken).
