= Leonhard Blasius =

Danish architect

Leonhard Blasius (also spelled Lennart, Leinert, Lineest) (died 8 December 1644) was a Danish architect in the service of King Christian IV.

== Biography ==
Blasius, who was certainly a Dutchman, probably arrived in Denmark from the Netherlands where he first worked in Glückstadt, Holstein, in the 1630s. He was called to Copenhagen in 1642 where he became a master builder, taking over the responsibilities of Hans van Steenwinckel the Younger. As royal architect to Christian IV, Blasius was credited for major building works, mainly churches, which were carried out by the king. He managed the construction of St. Anna Rotunda and in 1641 commenced the expansion of the Church of Holmen. In 1643, Blasius worked on Reberbanen in Copenhagen, built a bridge in Altona and rebuilt a church in Glückstadt. His contribution to Trinitatis Church and the adjoining Rundetårn (1643) may have been in the last period of construction. He was sent to Malmö in 1644 to lead a restoration on fortifications but died on 8 December. Although Blasius did repair work on the king's castles (1641 Koldinghus and Nygård, 1642 Tranekær, 1644 Nyborg Castle), his main effort was with churches. However, it is unclear whether Blasius had a decisive influence on their style, nor is he remembered for designing any buildings of his own. Blasius was married to Hedvig Gierritz who survived him; they had children together.
