= Åbenrå 25 =

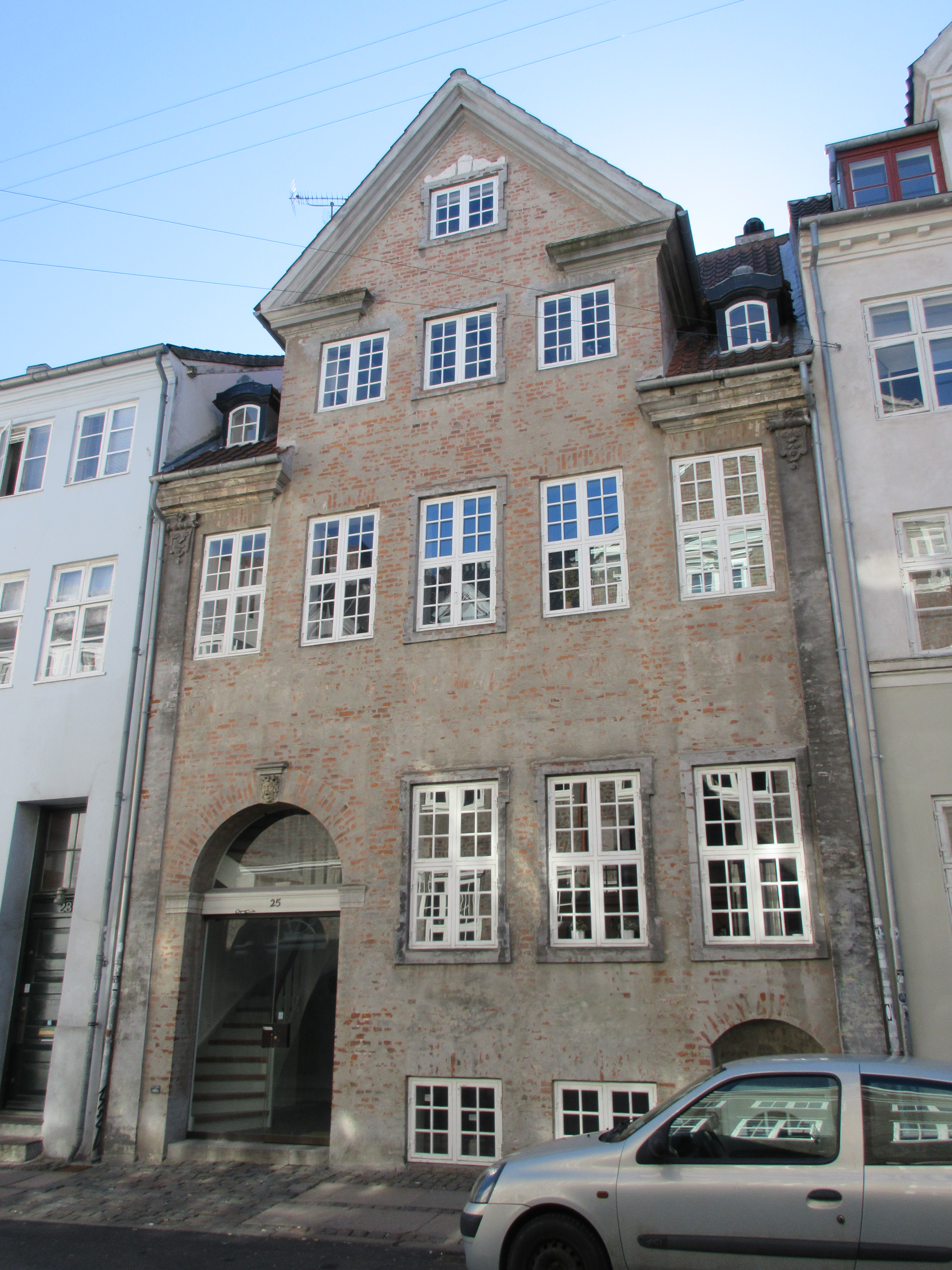
- Interactive map of the Åbenrå 25 area

General information
- Location: Copenhagen, Denmark
- Coordinates: 55°40′59.99″N 12°34′32.59″E
- Completed: 1733
- Renovated: 1855, 1895
- Client: Hinrich Ladiges

Åbenrå 25 is an 18th-century town house located at Åbenrå 25 in the Old Town of Copenhagen, Denmark. It was listed in the Danish registry of protected buildings and places in 1945.

== History ==
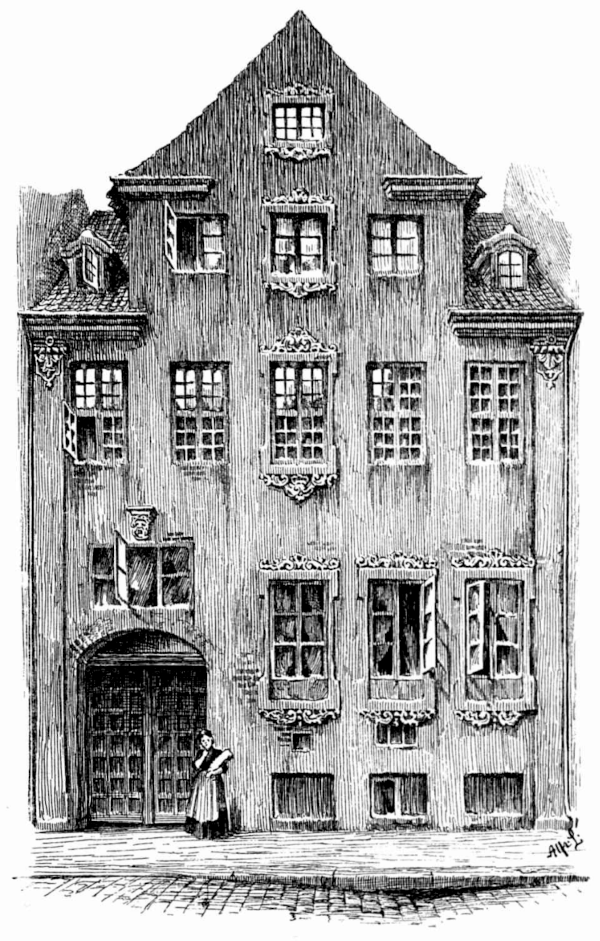
Åbenrå 25 in the 19th century

Åbenrå 25 was constructed in 1733 for the sculptor Friederich Ehbisch (1672-1748). His previous building on the site had been destroyed in the Copenhagen Fire of 1728. Ehbisch owned the building until his death in 1748.

The property comprised a half-timbered rear wing. In 1853-54, master baker W. C. Rubow replaced the rear wing with a new brick building at Hauser Plads 26 and Åbenrå 25 was the following year converted into a new rear wing for this building. The basement was heightened and adapted for use as stables. In 1785, Åbenrå was converted into a warehouse.

== Architecture ==
The building consists of two storeys over a raised cellar and is topped by a red tile roof with a two-storey, three-bay wall dormer. The facade is flanked by lesenes with capitals. The facade was originally decorated with sandstone ornamentation, probably created by Ehbisch, but these were removed in connection with the adaption for use as a warehouse in the 1890s.

== Today ==
The building has been converted into office space. It is together with Hauser Plads 26 jointly owned by the owners through E/F Hauser Plads 26.
