= Trinitatis Complex =

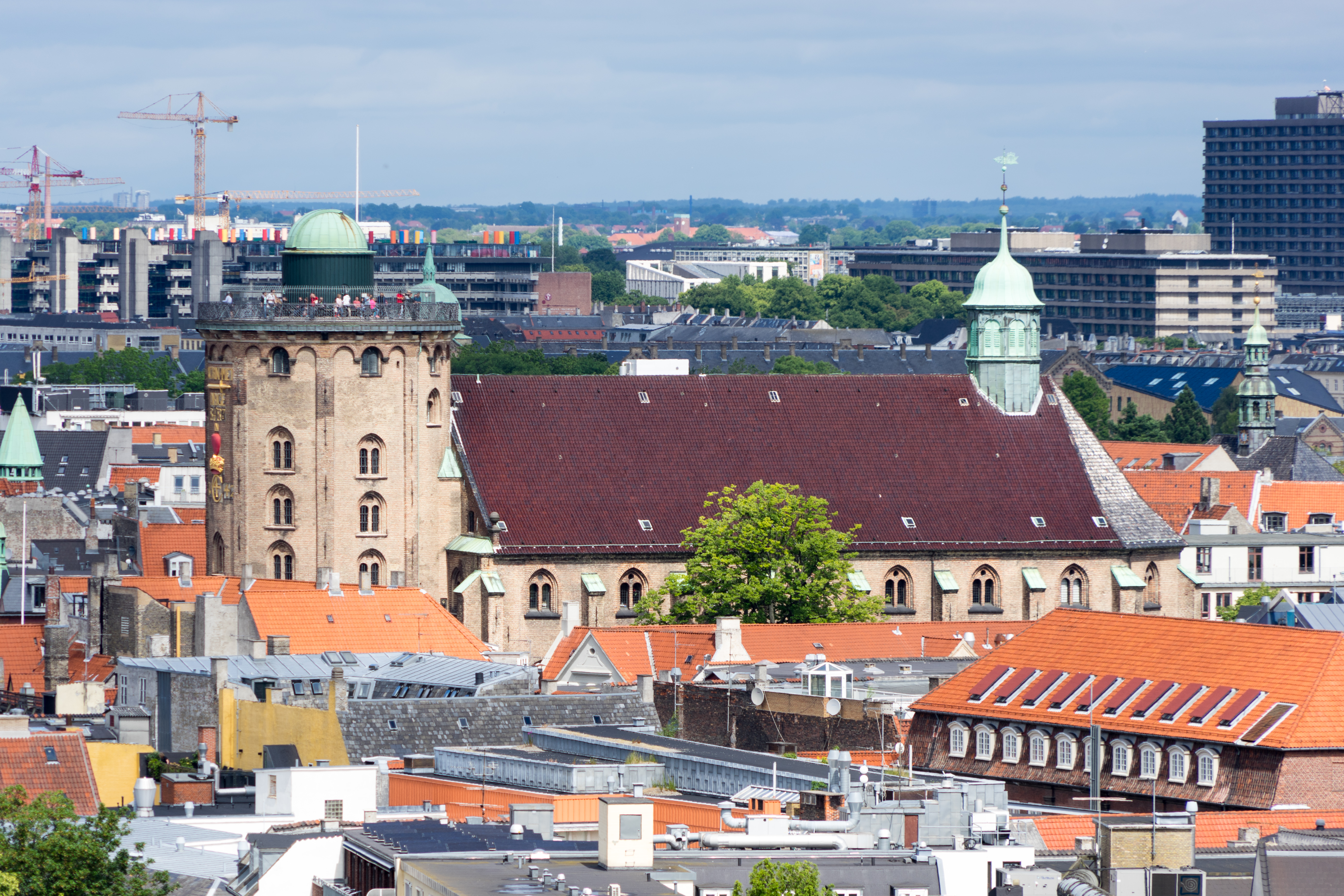

Trinitatis Complex is located in central Copenhagen, Denmark. The 17th-century building complex includes a church, university library, and astronomical observatory. Its features include the Trinitatis Church and the Rundetårn astronomical observatory tower, Rundetårn itself notable as Europe's oldest functioning observatory. The complex is of a Dutch Baroque design by Hans van Steenwinckel the Younger.
