= Friederich Ehbisch =

Johan Friedrich Ehbisch (Ebisch) (1672-6 May 1748) was a Danish sculptor. Born in Copenhagen, by 1705 he was employed as a court sculptor and stonemason. He was engaged in numerous royal projects; from 1705-09 he was responsible for the decoration of the Rosenborg Castle with stucco details. From 1709-11 he added stucco ceilings to Fredensborg Castle, and from 1726-28 renovated the altar, pulpit, baptismal font and the Royal chair in Fredensborg Chapel. In 1728 he was contracted to produce work for four churches which had been burned down in Copenhagen, the Frue, Petri, Helliggejst and Trinitatis churches. His works were mainly in the Late Baroque style, with many marble works.

His house at Åbenrå 25 was lost in the 1728 fire, but he rebuilt it in 1733, but was succumbed to poverty for the remaining 15 years of his life.
