= Trinitatis Church =

Coordinates: 55.681667°N 12.576111°E

- The Parish Church of the Holy Trinity
- Trinitatis Kirke
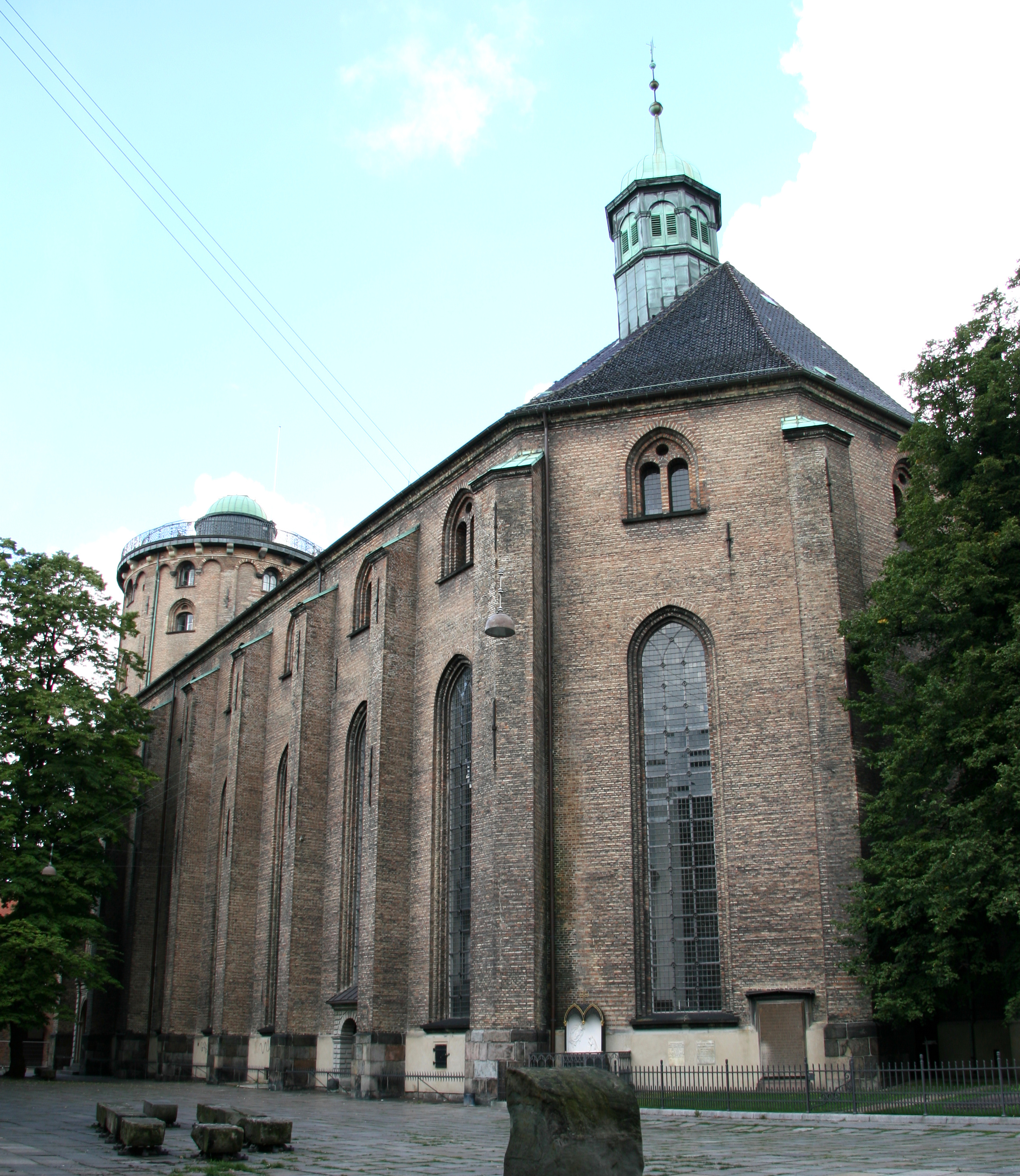
- Trinitatis Church
- Location: Copenhagen
- Country: Denmark
- Denomination: Church of Denmark
- Website: Church website

History
- Status: Active
- Founded: 7 July 1637
- Founder: Frederick IV of Denmark
- Dedication: Trinity
- Consecrated: 1 June 1656
- Events: 1 January 1869 (Became a Parish Church)

Architecture
- Functional status: Parish Church
- Years built: 1637-1651
- Completed: 7 July 1651

Administration
- Diocese: Copenhagen

Clergy
- Bishop: Peter Skov-Jakobsen
- Vicar: Erik Høegh-Andersen
- Priest: Anne Edmond Pedersen

The Trinitatis Church (Trinitatis Kirke) is located in central Copenhagen, Denmark. It is one of the best examples of Gothic Survival architecture in Denmark part of the 17th century Trinitatis Complex, which includes the Rundetårn astronomical observatory tower and the Copenhagen University Library, in addition to the church. Built in the time of Christian IV, the church initially served the students of Copenhagen University. It is situated at the corner of Landemærket and Købmagergade. The interior was seriously damaged in the fire of 1728 but was rebuilt in 1731.

== History ==
Initial plans in 1635 were for a student church at Regensen, the dormitory for students at Copenhagen University, but the following year, new plans emerged with the corner of Landemærket and Købmagergade earmarked for the church location, as it was decided to include the church in a complex extending to a church library and an astronomical observatory. The humanistically inspired combination was from a commission of Christian IV. There were three builders, namely Hans van Steenwinckel the Younger, Leonhard Blasius, and Albertus Mathiesen. At the time of construction, the church was the second largest in the city, second only to the Church of Our Lady. As the church was only intended to be used by university students and professors, it may appear oversized, but all indications are that the library space above the nave needed a certain church size.

The foundation stone was laid July 7, 1637, and the Round Tower was completed in 1642. The church was consecrated on Trinity Sunday 1656. The Copenhagen University Library was installed in the church loft in 1657. After marrying the widow of J.M. Radeck in 1685, Christian Geist assumed Radeck's organist position at the church.

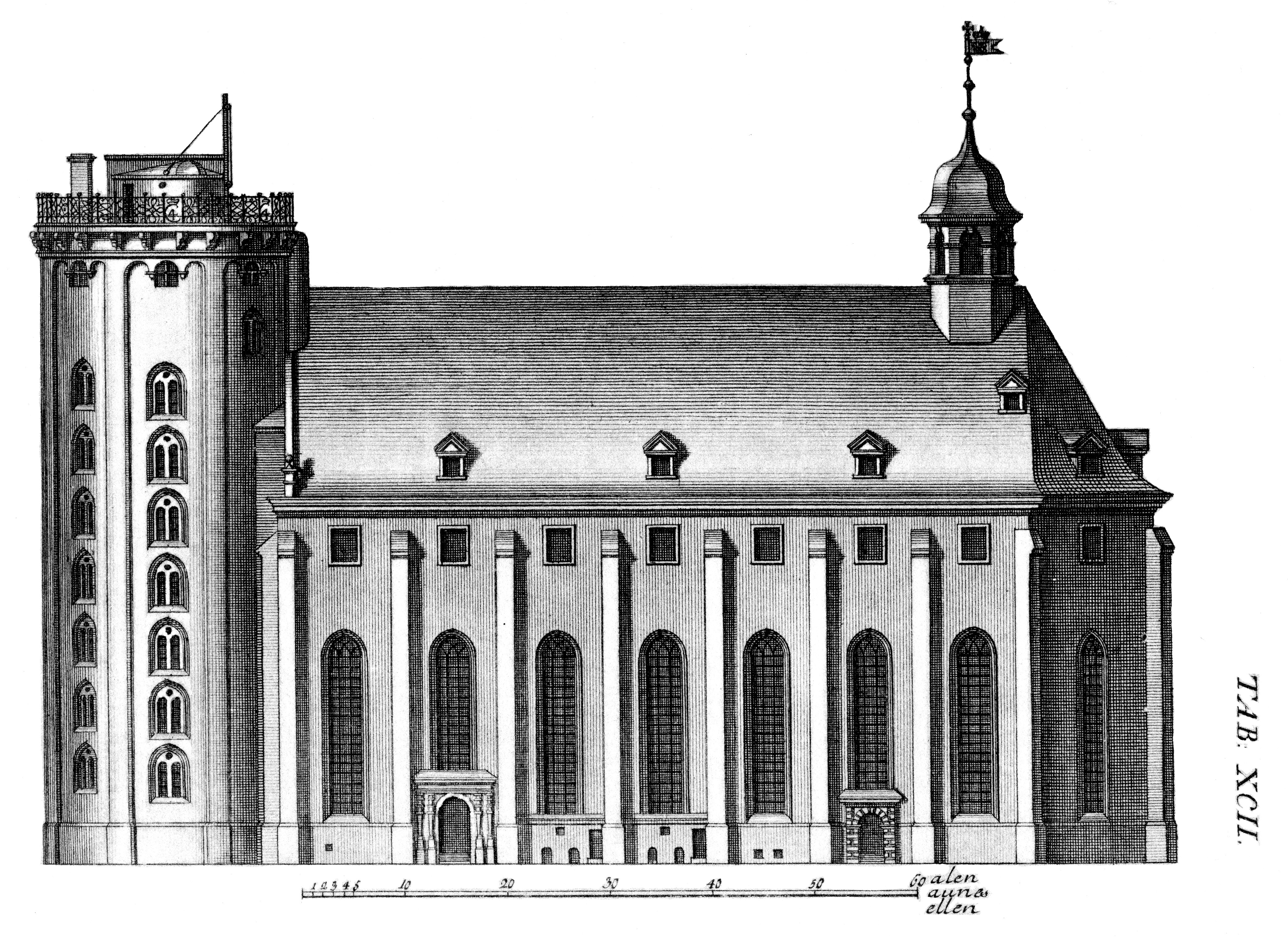
Thurah's drawing (1748)

During the fire of 1728, the Trinitatis Church was not as badly damaged as other churches in the city. The roof structure was ignited, a spire crashed into the library, punching a hole in some of the arches of the church. The university library was burnt. Church walls and vaults withstood the fire and subsequent repairs did not decisively change the church's appearance. A new cornice and spire were required. The new roof was covered with black glazed tiles. New dormer windows were inserted but only in one row. The interior bases and capitals of the columns and arches were repaired. All wood furnishings were replaced, and the floor was covered with tiles from Öland. The reconstruction was in Northern Gothic-Baroque style. The church was rededicated October 7, 1731 and the remains of the university library were moved again. The furnishings were renewed with an altarpiece and pulpit by Friederich Ehbisch (1731) and a large Baroque clock (1757). The church was refurbished in 1763.

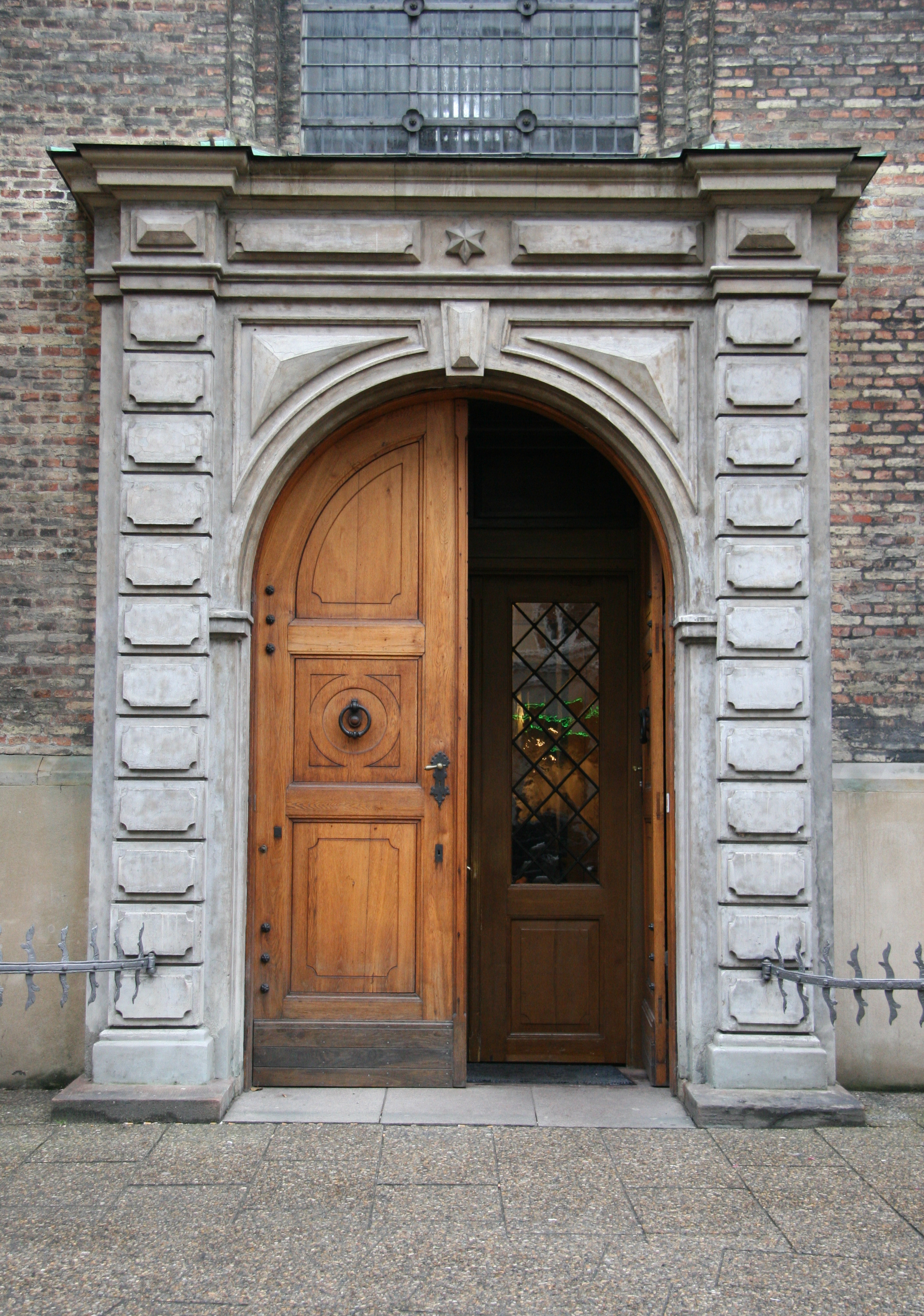
The northwest portal from 1870.

The Trinitatis Complex was hit during the 1807 British bombardment of Copenhagen, and damaged by major fires. Four bombs struck the library, but did not penetrate through to the church. Thanks to the efforts of churchwarden Tvermoes, injuries were minimized. Building repairs amounted to relatively modest 3,000 rigsdaler. Alterations were necessary in 1817 to celebrate the 300th anniversary of the Reformation. It was determined that the church's main entrance, the southwest portal, did not have suitable access through the fence wall and the cemetery for the procession of priests and professors who would join the festivities, so the north face became the church front. The small shops on the corner of Landemærket were closed, as was the remainder of the cemetery north of the church. The original portals were replaced with new ones, designed by Peder Malling. The eastern entrance was also reopened, having been bricked up for a number of years. A major restoration was completed in 1834-35 by Gustav Friedrich Hetsch, funded by a bequest from Christopher Hauschildt. Most of the work took place inside the building, including a vestry, detached on the south side of the choir. The roof was refurbished in 1848-49 without affecting its appearance. In 1861, the university library moved from the church attic to Johan Daniel Herholdt's library building in Fiolstræde. External renovations occurred 1869-71 by a design of Niels Sigfred Nebelong in connection with a change in the church's patronage. The sacristy on the south side of the chorus was removed and a new one built by the east gable, measuring approximately 3 by 6 metres (9.8 ft × 19.7 ft), with cut corners; it was transformed into a priest room in 1960. The notable chamber choir dates to 1993.

== Architecture and fittings ==
The original church consisted of a high, long brick building without much adornment, constructed of small Dutch bricks. The brickwork was laid in a cross-linking pattern of yellow and red stripes, obscured by accumulated dirt. Alterations and repairs in 1675 may have changed the building's appearance. The current exterior dates to the 1870 renovation. The interior is painted white. It consists of a nave with two lofty aisles and a chancel with a three-sided termination. Shaped as a longhouse, it is divided by eight pillars, the easternmost having chamfered corners. The roof was originally covered with slate. A flèche over the chancel houses the bells. The building's west end integrates the Rundetårn tower, which has a spiraling ramp to the top. Other features include buttresses and high granite plinths. The eastern sections have rounded corners. An original rectangular window is near the library floor. The tower originally had arched window openings. On the roof there were dormer windows in two rows. There were four gateways to the church, two on the north side and two on the south side. The church's south side was originally considered the front. As in a village church, the choir was set in the east, and the tower in the west, although the Round Tower was not part of the church. There are vaulted ceilings. The sanctuary was divided by two rows of seven columns in the longitudinal direction matching the church's exterior. What once functioned as the Library Hall now serves as an exhibition gallery and venue for classical concerts. The Marcussen & Søn organ dates to 1956.

== Grounds ==
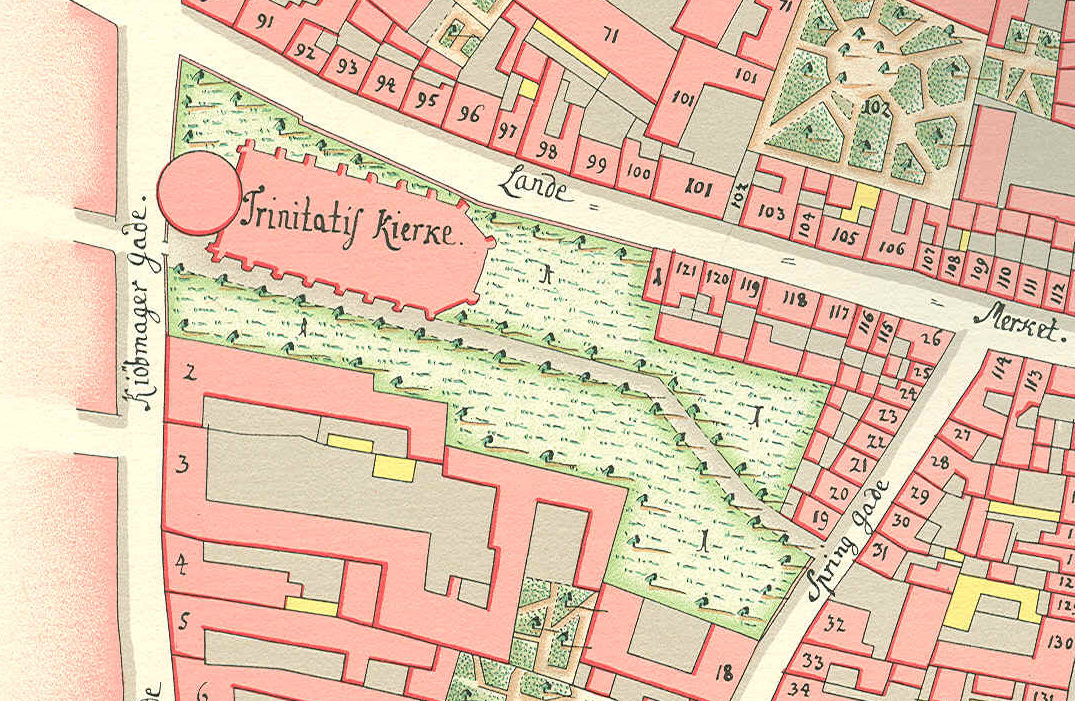
Geddes map of 1757.

A cemetery was added on the church grounds as evidenced by Geddes' 1757 map of the neighborhood. After the Copenhagen Fire of 1795, which did not affect Trinitatis Church, a mandate for fire insurance was imposed. As the premium was substantial for the church's small resources, the church attorney, Nicolaj Christoffer Kall, suggested building shops on church property and renting them out to help increase revenues. The proposal was approved and construction began in 1798. Most of the cemetery north of the church was involved, and the shops were built along Købmagergade from the Round Tower to Landemærket, and further along Landemærket. Positioned on the south side of the church, features include a burial vault (1870) and granite tiles (1928-29).

=== Burials ===
- Lauritz de Thurah (1706–1759), architect
- Frederik Christian Eilschov (1625–1750), philosopher
- Jørgen Elers (1647–1692), philanthropist
- Johannes Ewald (1743–1781), dramatist and poet
- Jacob Fabris (1689–1761), theatre painter and decorative artist
- Lorenz Nikolai Fallesen (1757–1824), priest, writer and editor
- Ludvig Sophus Fallesen (1807–1840), forester and mathematician)
- Hans Gram (1685–1748), linguist and historian
- Jens Hornsyld (1757–1840), priest
- Frederik Theodor Hurtigkarl, (1763–1829)
- Bolle Luxdorph (1643–1698), civil servant and landowner
- Bolle Willum Luxdorph (1716–1788), civil servant and writer
- Claudi Rosset (1687–1767), galanterie merchant and philanthropist
- Christian Sandvig (1752–1786), historian and writer
- Hans Schack /1608–1676), military officer and count
- Henrik von Stöcken (1631–1681), civil servant
- Johan Herman Wessel (1742–1785), poet, satirist and playwright

== Gallery ==
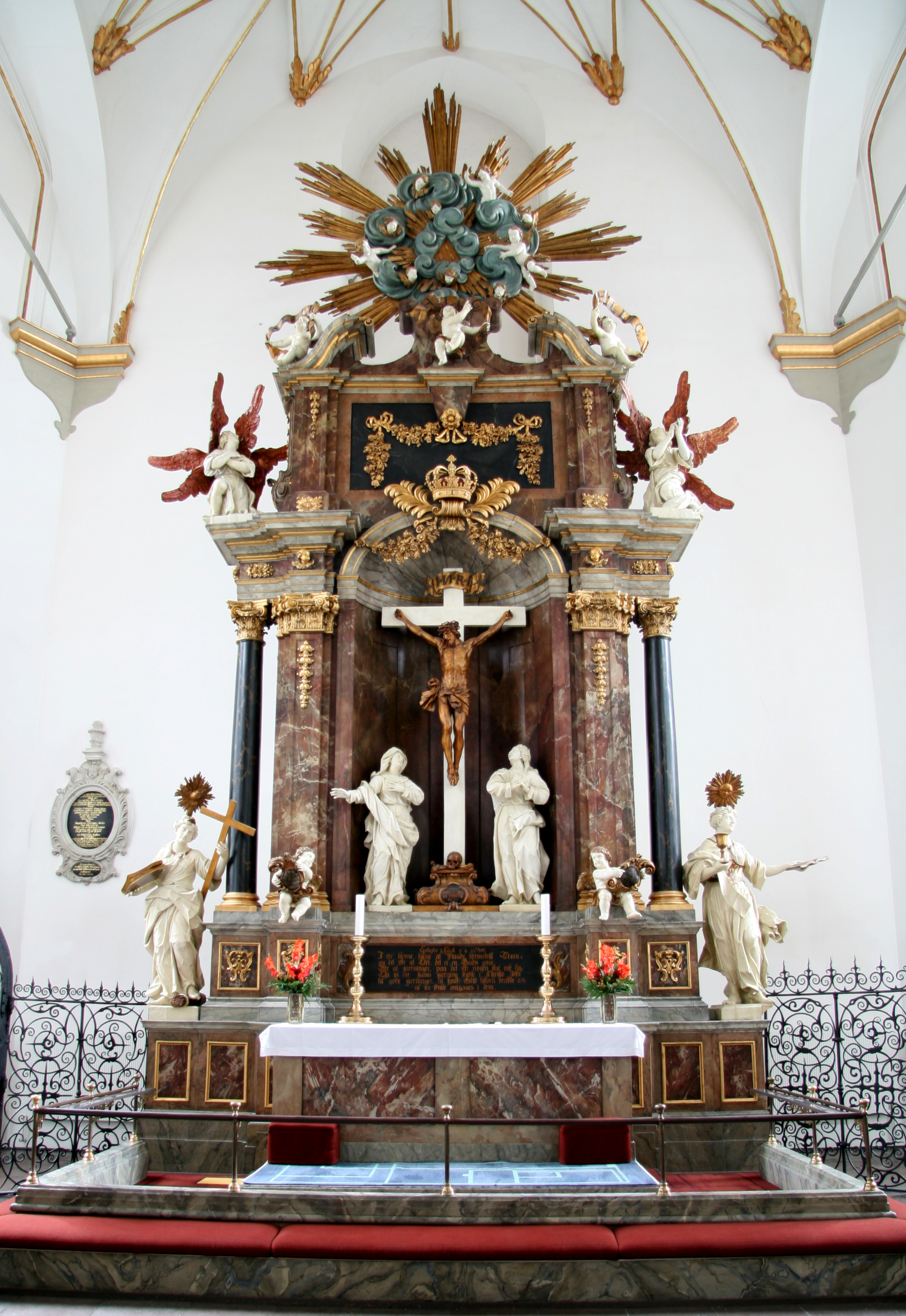
Altarpiece: Friederich Ehbisch (1731)

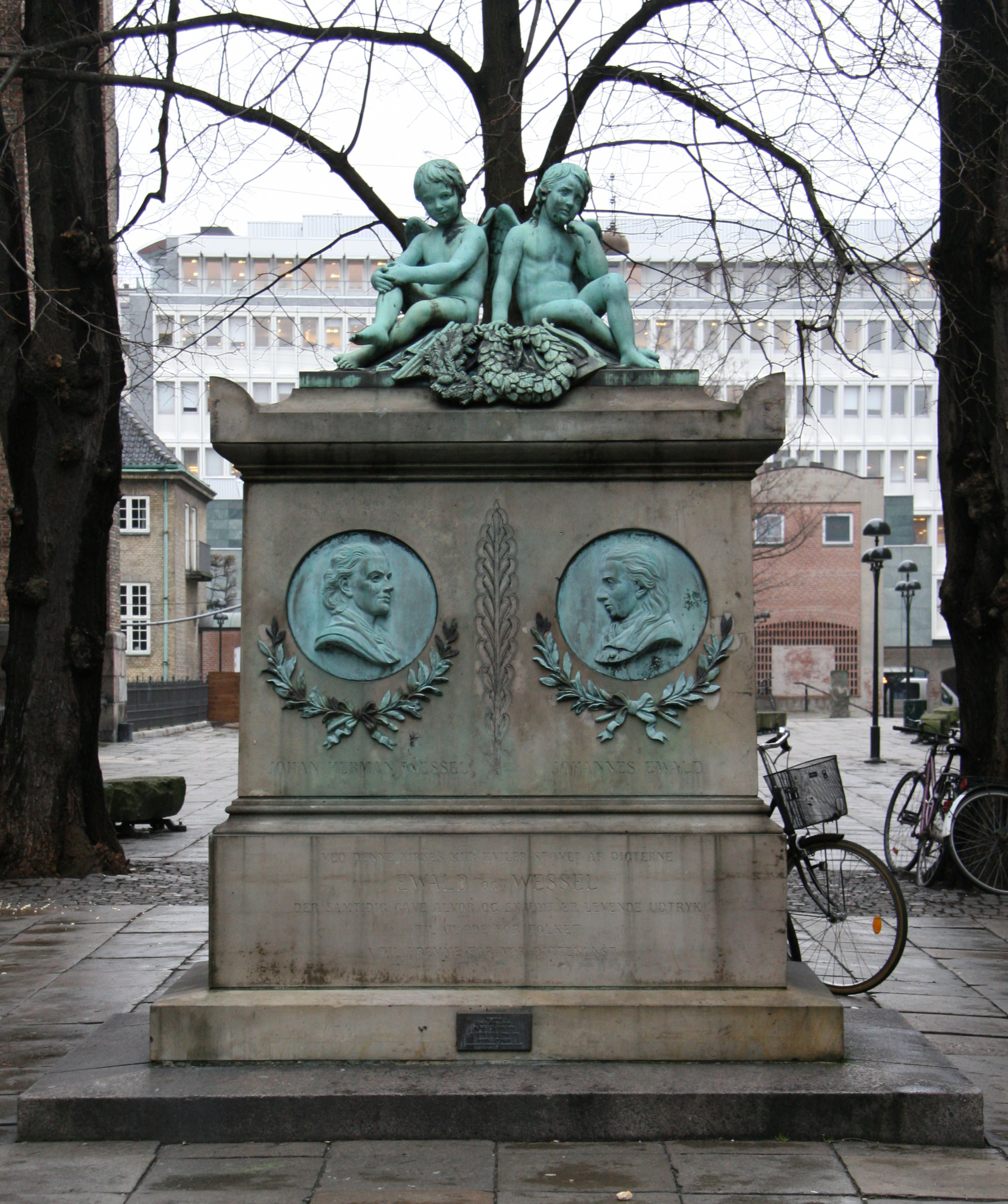
Monument to Ewald and Wessel: Otto Evens (1879)

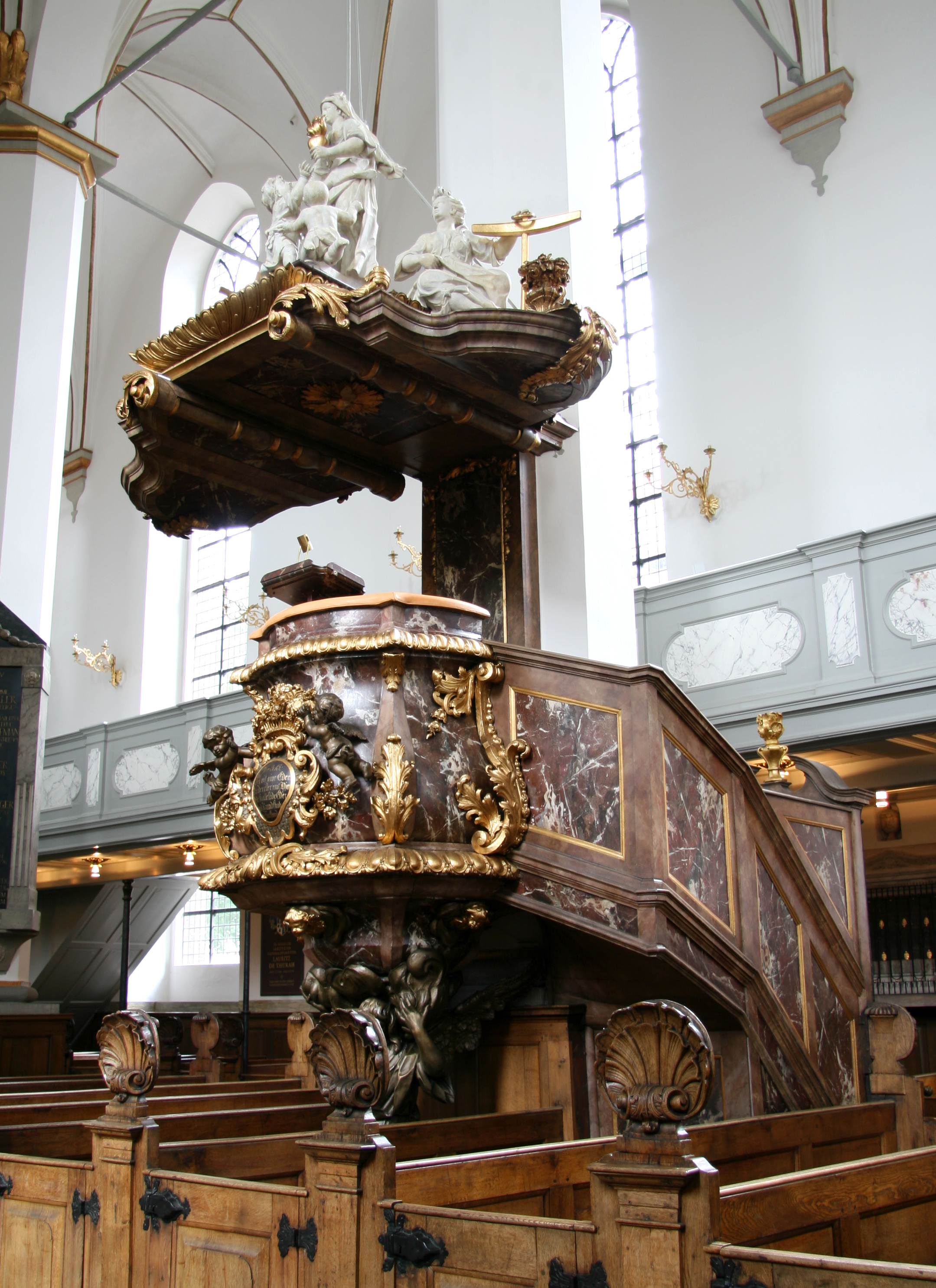
Pulpit: Ehbisch (1731)

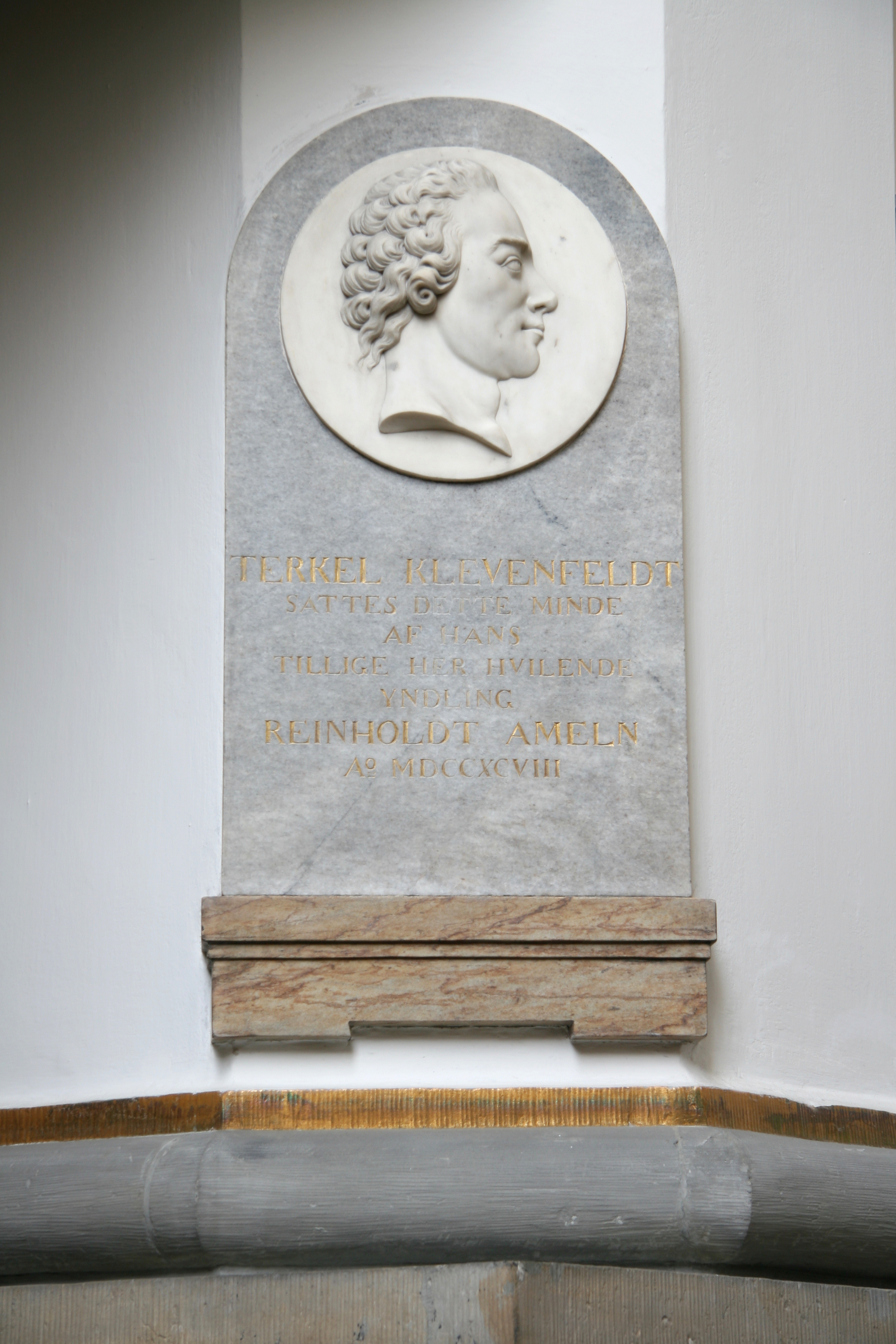
Terkel Klevefeldt's Epitaph
