= Bolle Willum Luxdorph =

Danish civil servant (1716–1788)

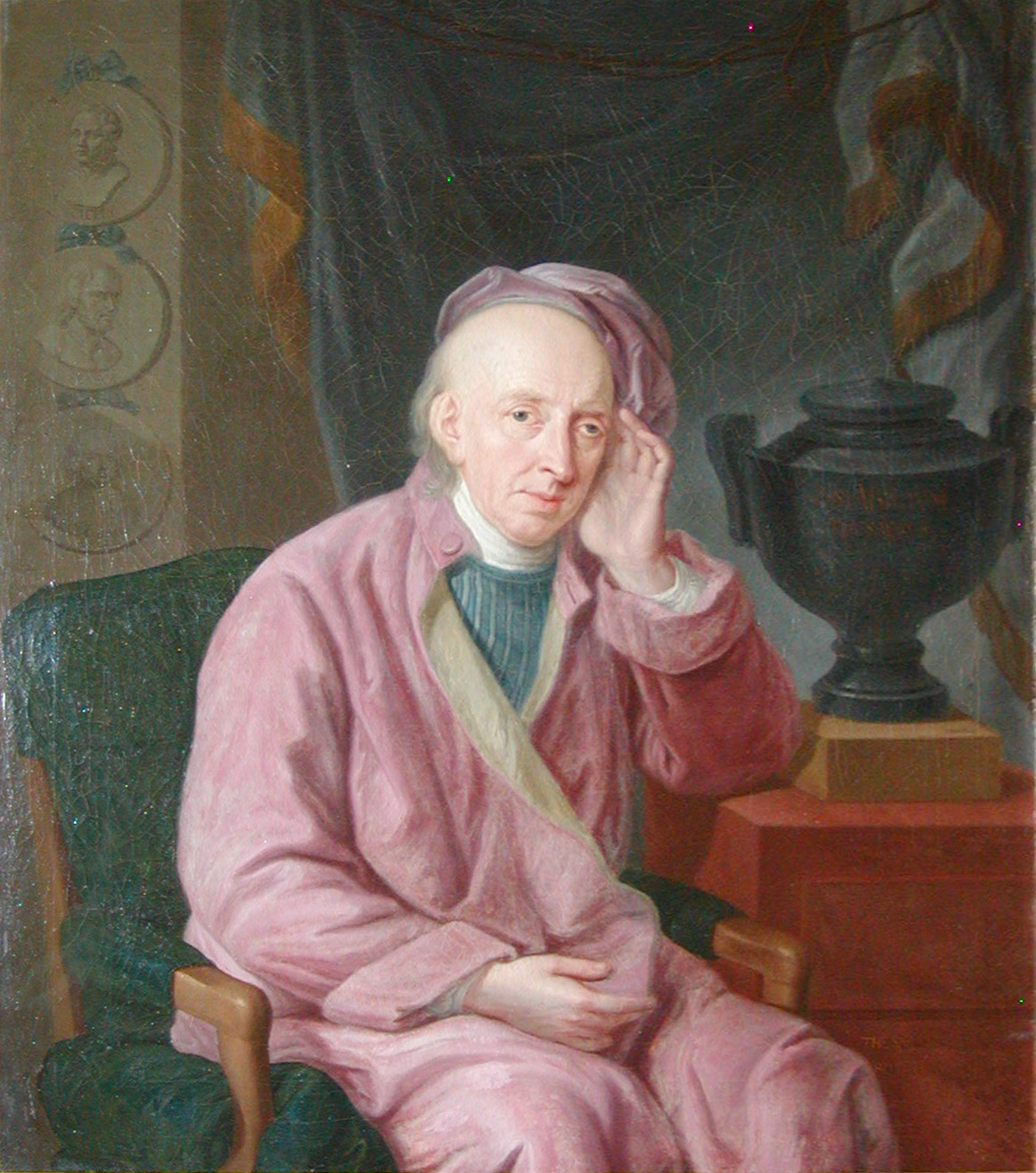
- Portrait by Georg Mathias Fuchs from 1782
- Born: 24 July 1716; Copenhagen, Denmark
- Died: 13 August 1788 (aged 72); Copenhagen, Denmark
- Resting place: Trinitatis Church
- Occupations: Civil servant, writer
- Known for: His book collection
- Awards: Order of the Elephant, 1774

Bolle Willum Luxdorph (24 July 1716 – 13 August 1788) was a Danish government official and book collector. Today, he is best remembered for his diaries and his collection of uncensored books.

== Career ==
Luxdorph graduated from the University of Copenhagen in 1733 with a bachelor's degree. He chose not to take the civil service exam after graduating, as he had already become secretary to the Danske Kancelli.

In 1738, he received a post in the Zealand Landsting. There, he became a supreme court assessor in 1744 and a county judge in 1747. In 1749 he became an attorney general. He returned to the Danske Kancelli in 1753 as Master of Requests, where he took on the additional role of archivist in 1759. He left the Kancelli in 1771 to briefly work for the Guineanske Handelsselskab (lit. 'Guinean Trading Company') before returning as a deputy and head of its first department in 1771. In 1773, he became the first deputy of the Kancelli. He was offered the position of Justice of the Supreme Court. Having reject the offer, Luxdorph had written his letter resignation from the Kancelli, but died three days after having written it and never formally sent it.

Within the civil service, Luxdorph was highly detail oriented, thorough, and cautious—enough so that his lack of speed caused complaints. He was conservative and wary of change, who increasingly found himself at odds with the reforms and scandals created by Johann Friedrich Struensee.

== Book collection ==
Luxdorph left a book collection of 15,000 volumes. It was sold at auction after his death. Many of them are now in the Royal Danish Library. His collection is particularly valued for its works from the Trykkefrihedstiden (lit. 'Free-Press Era') which lasted from 1770 to 1773. Although the freedom of the press existed for less than three years, Luxdorph eagerly collected as many pamphlets as he could and had them bound in 47 volumes. His diaries, which have since been published are also a valuable source of 18th century history.

Books from his library feature his bookplate, which featured an elephant's head holding a crown in its trunk with three arrows. The symbol used in his bookplate are part of the Luxdorph family coat of arms which his grandfather received when he was ennobled in 1679.

== Personal life ==
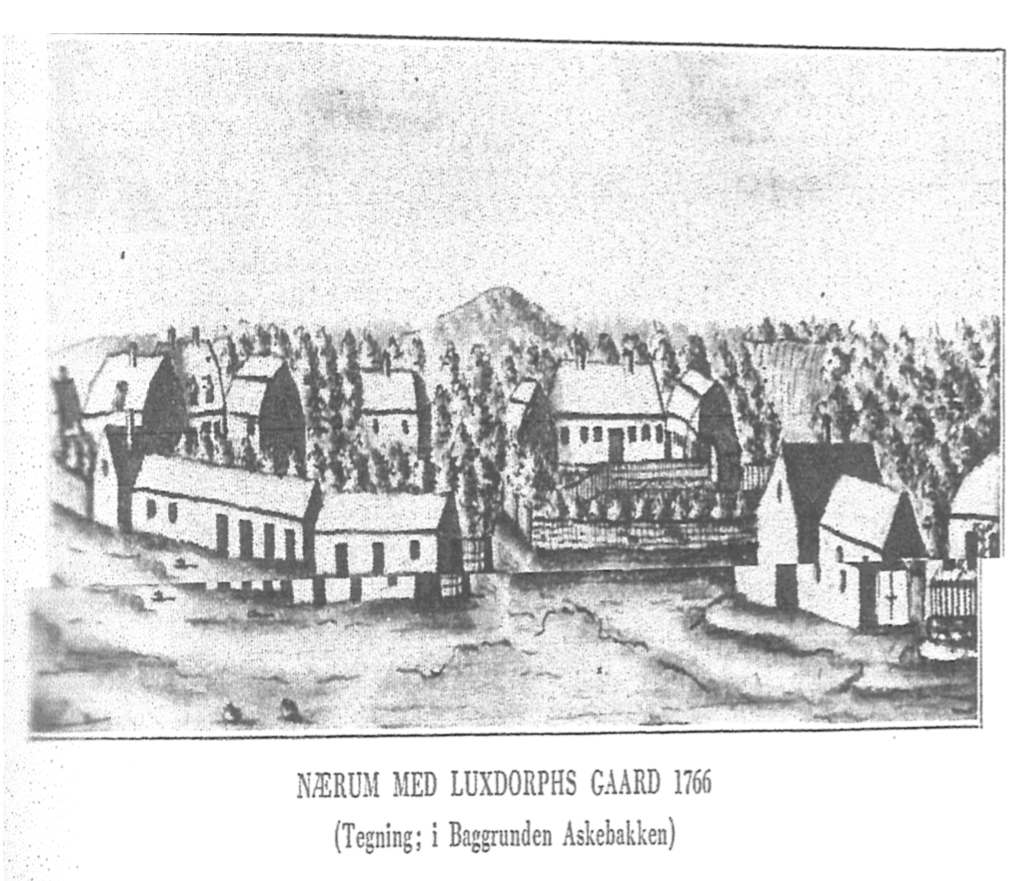
Luxdorph's house in Nærum, 1766

Bolle Willum Ludxdorph was born on 24 July 1716 in Copenhagen, the son of colonel Christian Luxdorph (1684–1726) and Susanne Magdalene Worm (1680–1735). His paternal grandfather was Bolle Luxdorph.

Luxdorph married Anna Bolette de Junge (1719–1781) on 14 June 1748 in Copenhagen at the Church of the Holy Spirit. She was the daughter of Severin de Junge and Catharine Wissing (1693–1724).

His father had owned Mørup, which he then inherited after his death. In 1748, the estate burned down and his entire inheritance was lost. He was forced to sell the property to cover its mortgages. Luxdorph then moved to a modest apartment near Gammel Strand in Copenhagen. In 1753, he purchased a country house in Nærum, which later became known as the Hartmann Hus. There, he had his summer residence until 1782.

He died on 13 August 1788 in Copenhagen and is buried in Trinitatis Church.
