= Peder Luxdorph =

Danish judge (1648–1702)

Peder Luxdorph (1648 – 5 January 1702) was a Danish landowner and judge who was ennobled in 1679 under the name Luxdorph. He was headmaster of Herlufsholm School.

== Early life and education ==
Luxdorph was born in Copenhagen, the son of Christen Bollesen Luxdorph (died 1669) and Maren Olufsdatter Stafrofski (died1689). He was the younger brother of Bolle Luxdorph. He graduated from Herlufsholm School in 1666 and then studied law at universities abroad.

== Career and property ==
In 1678, Luxdorph was appointed as deputy judge of Lolland-Falster Landsting. In 1679, he was ennobled under the name Luxdorph.

He acquired Fjellebro Manor Skovgård on Funen in 1783 and was two years later appointed as district judge (landsdommer) of Funen and Langeland. In 1786, he acquired Nybøllegaard Manor. In 1687, he was appointed as Chancellery Councillor (kancelliråd) and in 1700 as justitsråd.

== Family ==
Luxdorph married Anna Margrethe Helverskov, a daughter of rådmand Henrik Jacobsen and Helene Helverskov and the widow of Peder Hansen Hovenbek of Hanstedgård.
