= Nybøllegård, Funen =

Danish manor house

Coordinates: 55°12′25″N 10°22′23″E

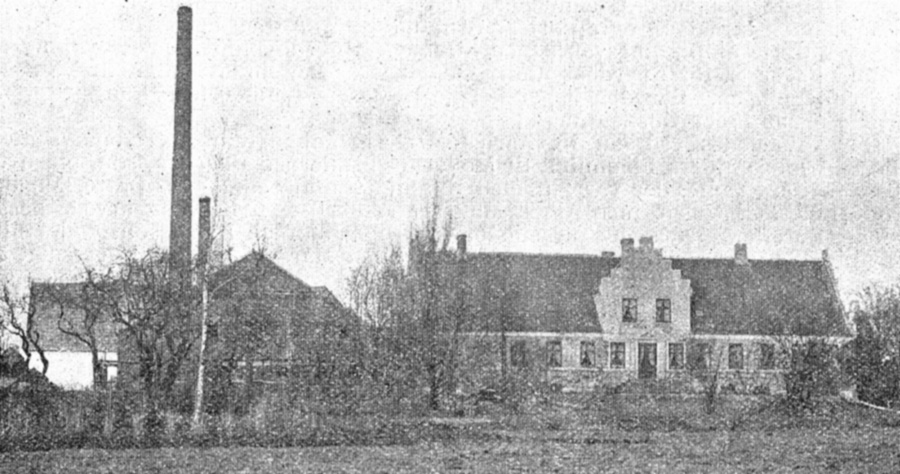
Nybøllegård in 1906

Nybøllegård is a manor house in Funen, Denmark. It has been in the possession of a number of Danish noble families, including the Rosenkrantz and Bille families.

== History ==
The manor of Nybøllegaard is first mentioned in 1580 when it was owned by Laurits Brockenhuus. His widow kept the estate until her death in 1625. Their daughter Rigborg Brockenhuus lived on the estate until her death in 1641.

== Architecture ==
The main building was constructed from 1856 to 1858 with a single storey over a walk-out basement. The building has a red tile roof with crow-stepped gables.

== List of owners ==
- ( –1604) Lauritz Brockenhuus
- (1604–1625) Karen Skram, m. Brockenhuus
- (1625–1641) Rigborg Brockenhuus
- (1641–1647) Ludvig Rosenkrantz
- (1641–1647) Maximillian Rosenkrantz
- (1647–1657) Anders Bille
- (1657–1682) Mette Rosenkrantz, m. 1) Bille, 2) Bille, 3) Krabbe
- (1682–1684) Pernille Bille, m. Trolle
- (1684–1685) Anders Eriksen Bille
- (1685–1699) Peder Luxdorph
- (1699–1705) Peter Jørgensen Møller
- (1705–1715) Clemens Jørgensen Møller
- (1715–1729) Erik Skeel
- (1729–1742) Ide Skeel
- (1742–1766) Erik Skeel v. Holsten
- (1766–1770) Frederik Christian Ludvig von Pentz
- (1770–1773) Ditlev von Pentz
- (1773–1798) Frederik Siegfried Rantzau
- (1798–1801) Christian Heinrich August Hardenberg-Reventlow
- (1801–1805) Frederik Wilhelm Rasmussen
- (1805– ) Niels Byskov
- ( –1820) Frederik Byskov
- (1820– ) Tibotius Strange
- ( –1840) Hans Hansen
- (1840–1845) Peder Kristian Hansen
- (1845–1854) Ludvig Ditlev Schaffalitzky de Muckadell
- (1854–1856) Carl Emil Bay
- (1856–1858) Jørgen Andersen
- (1858–1870) Hans Christian Andersen
- (1870–1918) Henry Alfred Oxholm Smidt
- (1918–1925) Edvard E. Oxholm Smidt
- (1925–1934) Mads Larsen
- (1934–1965) Hugo Føge Jensen
- (1965–1989) Hans Peter Aagaard Andersen
- (1989– ) H.L. Aagaard Andersen
