= Rosengaard =

Danish manor house

- Interactive map of the Rosengaard area

General information
- Location: Kirkevej 26; 4100 Ringsted, Denmark
- Coordinates: 55°27′41″N 11°52′44″E
- Completed: 1869

Rosengaard is a manor house and estate in Ringsted Municipality, Denmark.

== History ==
=== Early history ===
In the 14th and 15th centuries, Kværkebygaard was a manor under Ringsted Abbey. Kværkeby was, with its 30 farms, one of the larger villages in the area. Kværkebygaard was from 1340 to 1346 held in fee by Niels Jensen Kværkby. K. Tetz was lensmann from 1414 to 1420. He was in 1436 succeeded by his son, Jens Tetz Rosengaard, and from then on the estate was frequently referred to as Rosengaarden after him.

Ringsted Abbey was confiscated by the Crown during the Reformation in 1536. In 1662, Lellinge was granted to supervisor of the royal kitchen (køkkenskriver) Hans Olufsen, Abel Cathrine's husband, as payment for an old debt. Two years later his brother, a court butcher, received Ringsted Ladegård. The farms in the villages of Kværkeby, Kongsted and Vigersted were, however, ceded to Hans Olufsen. Rosengaard was then a large farm with 30 tønder hartkorn of land.

Olufsen's widow and other heirs sold Rosengaard to Bolle Luxdorph in 1685. Luxdorph expanded the estate to 200 tønder hartkorn and in 1693 unsuccessfully tried to convert it into a manor.

=== Knuth family ===
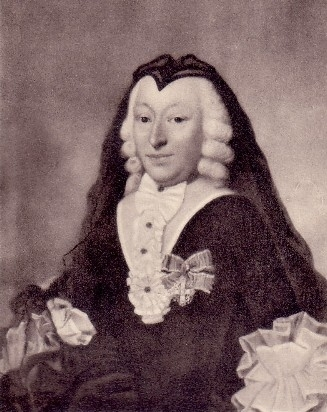
Ida Margrethe Reventlow

Luddorph's daughter, Hedevig Ulrikke, in 1713 brought Rosengaard into her marriage with Adam Christoffer Knuth. After the death of his first wife, Knuth married a second time to Ide Margrethe Reventlow. Reventlow kept the estate after her husband's death in 1736. In 1743, she converted Rosengaard, Sørupgaard and Sandbygaard into the Barony of Conradsborg for her son Conrad Ditlev Knuth.

Conrad Ditlev Knuth achieved a successful career at the court. In 1784, he ceded the barony to his son Adam Christoffer Knuth. Due to economic difficulties, the barony was converted into a fideikommis in 1796.

=== Later history ===
In 1797, Rosengaard was sold at auction to Lars Lassen. In 1806, he sold it to Peter Octavius Andersen. A lieutenant named Pingel acquired it in 1816. He sold it to Frederik Hilarius Kalkau in 1832.

In 1866, Rosengaard was purchased by Johannes Theodor Suhr, a member of the wealthy Suhr family from Copenhagen. After his death in 1888, the estate was passed on to his son by the same name. He was succeeded by his son Erik Suhr who owned the estate until 1968.

== Architecture ==
The current main building is from 1869. It consists of three single-storey, detached wings. The complex is built in yellow brick and has a half-hipped red tile roof. The central, main wing has a four-bay median risalit. The buildings underwent a comprehensive refurbishment in 1941.

== Today ==
Rosengaard is now owned by Niels Christian Engelsborg Voss.

== List of owners ==
- ( –1536) Ringsted Abbey
- (1536–1664) The Crown
- (1664–1670) Hans Olufsen
- (1670–1685) Heirs of Hans Olufsen
- (1685–1698) Bolle Luxdorph
- (1698–1713) Hedevig Ulrikke Luxdorph (married Knuth)
- (1713–1736) Adam Christoffer Knuth
- (1736–1743) Ida Margrethe Reventlow (married Knuth)
- (1743–1784) Conrad Ditlev Knuth
- (1784–1797) Adam Christoffer Knuth
- (1797–1806) Lars Lassen
- (1806–1816) Peter Octavius Andersen
- (1816–1832) Pingel
- (1832–1866) Johan Frederik Hilarius Kalkau
- (1866–1888) Johannes Theodor Suhr
- (1888–1920) Johannes Theodor Suhr
- (1920–1933) Eva Fabricius (married Suhr)
- (1933– ) Johannes Theodor Suhr
- (1933–1968) Erik Suhr
- (1968–2016) Bent Engelsborg
- (1968– ) Ruth Engelsborg Suhr
- (1992– ) Helle Engelsborg Olsen
- (1998– ) Niels Christian Engelsborg Voss
