= Bolle Luxdorph =

Danish civil servant

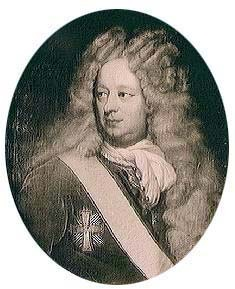
- Born: 19 February 1643; Copenhagen, Denmark
- Died: 5 September 1698 (aged 55); Stockholm, Sweden
- Occupation: Civil servant
- Awards: Order of the Elephant, 1685

Bolle Luxdorph (19 February 1643 – 5 September 1698) was a Danish civil servant and landowner. He was ennobled under the name Luxdorph in 1679. He owned the estates Rosengaard, Sandbygaard, and Sørupgaard. He left them to his daughter, Hedevig Ulrika Luxdorph, who would later marry Christopher Knuth, 1st Count of Knuthenborg. His other child, Christian Luxdorph, was the father of Bolle Willum Luxdorph.

== Early life and travels ==
Luxdorph was born in Copenhagen, the son of Christen Bollesen Luxdorph (died 1669) and Maren Olufsdatter Stafrofski (died 1689). He was the elder brother of Peder Luxdorph. His father was employed as economist at Herlufsholm from 1651 and he graduated from the school in 1660. He worked then for a while in the household of professor Peder Resen and from 1662 to 1664 served as a tutor at his old school. In 1675, he accompanied the Danish minister in London Simon de Petkum to England by way of Germany and Belgium. He then spent four years in France.

== Civil servant ==
In 1669, Luxdorph was appointed to secretary in the Danish chancellery. He had close ties to Peder Schumacher (Griffenfeld) and was first appointed as ordenssekretær (1671) and then ceremonimester (1672). Griffenfeld's fall from power did not stop his career. In 1676, he was promoted to assessor of the Danish chancellery and in 1680 to kancelliråd and secretary of Kommercekollegiet. In 1688, he was appointed as oversekretær. He was awarded the title of etatsråd in 1684.

Accusations of nepotism and acting against the will of the king made him fall out of favor; he was dismissed in 1690. The incident was related to Thomas Kingo's monopoly on publishing a hymnal. Kingo was a personal friend and Luxdorph attempted to grant him a more extensive monopoly than approbated by the king.

Ulrik Frederik Gyldenløve ultimately arranged for him to make amends and in 1691 he was appointed as Danish minister in Stockholm. He assisted Jens Juel in connection with the conclusion of the armed neutrality pact in 1693.

== Property ==
Luxdorph owned a house in Pustervig in Copenhagen, A combination of inheritance, dowries and royal favours contributed to his wealth and over the years he became a major landowner. He acquired Sørup (1672 and 1674), Sandbygård (1684), Rosengaard (1685) as well as Bispegården's land in Holstebro (1697).

Luddorph was created a White Knight in 1695.

== Personal life ==
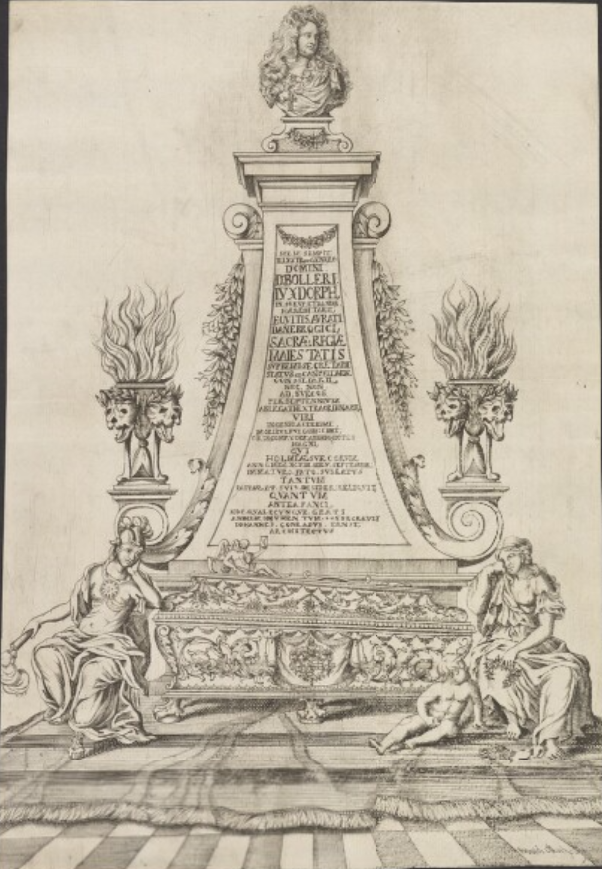
Copperprint engraving

Luxdorph married twice. His first wife was Jytte Bering (1654–1684), a daughter of Historiographer Royal Vitus Bering (1617–1675) and Anne Nielsdatter (1630–1657). They married on 29 November 1671 in the Church of Our Lady in Copenhagen. They had one son, Christian Bollesen Luxdorph (1684–1726). He was in turn the father of Bolle Willum Luxdorph.

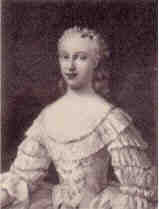
Hedevig Ulrika Luxdorph

Luxdorph's second wife was Frederikke Amalie Adeler (1667–1712), daughter of Admiral Cort Adeler (1622–1675) and Anna Pelt (1640–1692). They had four children, of whom only a daughter lived to adulthood.

Bolle Luxdorph died on 5 September 1698 in Stockholm. He is buried in Trinitatis Church in Copenhagen. He left Rosengaard, Sandbygaard and Sørupgaard to his surviving daughter by his second wife, Hedevig Ulrika Luxdorph, who married Christopher Knuth in 1813. He who was elevated to the status of count the following year.
