= Danske Kancelli =

Administrative body in Denmark (12th c. – 1848)

The Dansk Kancelli (lit. 'Danish Chancellery') was an administrative and partially governmental body in Denmark from the 12th century to 1848.

== History ==
=== Before the Reformation ===
From the 12th century to the Reformation in 1536 its name was simply the Chancellery (Danish: Kancelli). The chancellor was appointed by the king from among bishops. It had the responsibility of the expedition of letters and orders from the king. Later it also gained the responsibility of copying and archiving the king's regulations.

=== From the Reformation to the introduction of absolute monarchy ===
After the Reformation the Chancellery was renamed Danish Chancellery (Danish: Danske Kancelli) to distinguish it from the German Chancellery (Danish: Tyske Kancelli). The Danish Chancellery was responsible for all correspondence in Danish and the civil administration of Denmark, Norway and Sweden. The German Chancellery had similar responsibility for the German and Latin correspondence and the civil administration of duchies of Schleswig and Holstein. Before, 1770, when it was separated into its own ministry, the German Chancellery was also responsible for foreign policy towards all but the Nordic countries.

The chancellor was now a noble and not a clergyman.

Over the years the chancellery gained a strong governmental power in additional to its administrative responsibilities.

First mentioned in 1550s Rentekammeret (lit. Rent Chamber) was a part of the Danish Chancellery. It had the responsibility of the state financial administration. Under and after Christian IV the central administration grew rapidly. Bureaus such as a postal service and customs where created.

=== Under absolute monarchy ===
At the introduction of absolute monarchy in Denmark, a number of equivalent administration and governing bodies was introduced including the War Chancellery (Danish: Krigskancelliet), and Kommercekollegiet. Rentekammeret was elevated and renamed to Skatkammerkollegiet.

== Chancellors ==
=== Kongens Kansler ===
Years	Kongens Kansler	Notes
1190-1201	Anders Sunesen	
1201-1214	Peder Sunesen	
1214-1232	Niels	
1232-1245	Niels Stigsen Galen	
1245-1252	Peder Ranesen Prælat	
1252-1267	Niels, Bishop of Viborg	
1267-1282	Niels Jyde	
1296-1304	Martin of Dacia	
1313-1320	Guido of Halland	
1328-29	Peder Jensen Galen	
1376	Niels Jacobsen Ulfeldt	
1396-1398	Peder Jensen Lodehat	
1400-1413	Jacob Prælat	
1413-1416	Jens Andersen Lodehat	
1418	Jens Jacobsen Prælat	
1419-34	Johannes Petri	
1435-39	Laurencius Brand	
1439-46	Oluf Mortensen Baden	
1448-50	Oluf Jensen	
1452	Oluf Mortensen Baden	
1452-53	Jens Clausen Prælat	
1454-55	Oluf Mortensen Baden	
1455-57	Tetz Rosengaard	
1458	Mogens Krafse	
1459-60	Daniel Kepken	
1460	Jens Brostrup	
1460-64	Daniel Kepken	
1465	Johannes Theoderi	
1469-72	Jens Brostrup	
1473	Johannes "Nicholas" Prælat	
1473-80	Jens Pedersen	
1482	Lage Johannis Mester	
1483-85	Niels Skave	
1486-93	Johan Jepsen Ravensberg	
1493-1496	Hans Clausen	
1502-1510	Hartvig	
1511-12	Lage Urne	
1509-20	Ove Bille, Bishop Århus	
1520-22	Jesper Brochmand (acting)	
1522-23	Claus Pedersen	
1523-26	Gotskalk Eriksen Rosenkrantz	

=== Danske Kansler ===
Years	Danske Kansler	Notes
1523-1532	Claus Gjordsen	
1533-1570	Johan Friis til Borreby	
1570(73)-1594	Niels Kaas til Tårupgård	
1594-1616	Christian Friis til Borreby	
1190-1201	Christian Friis til Kragerup	
1640-1657	Christian Thomesen Sehested til Bækmark	

== See also ==
- Rentekammeret
