= Knuthenborg =

Manor house on the Danish island of Lolland

Coordinates: 54°49′41″N 11°29′19″E

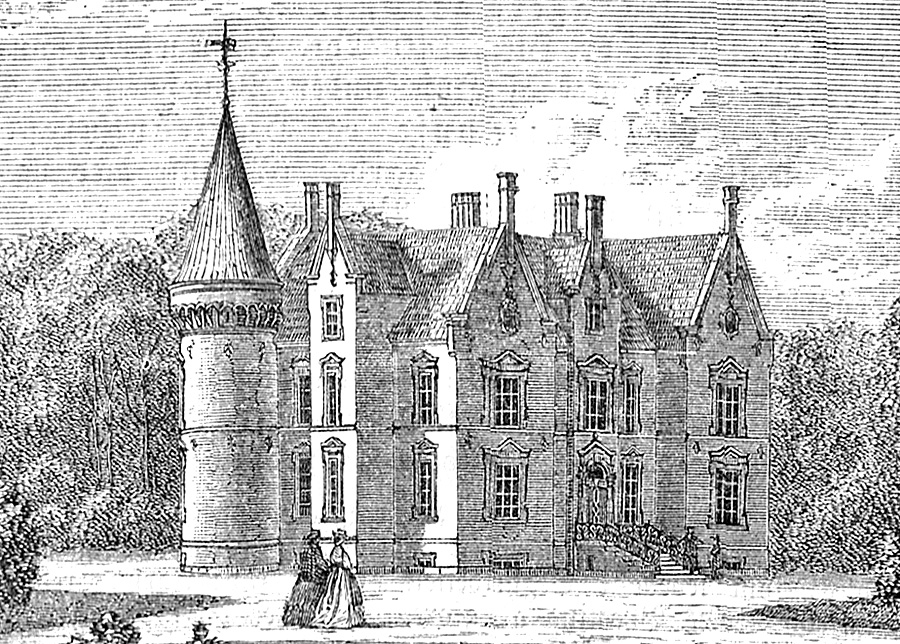
Knuthenborg c. 1870, drawing by J.P. Trap

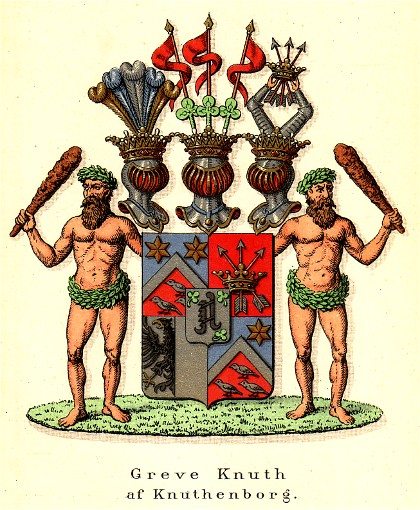
Coat of arms

Knuthenborg is a manor house located six kilometres (3 1/2 miles) north of Maribo on the Danish island of Lolland. Originally known as Årsmarke, it was first mentioned in 1372. Today's building was completed in 1866 to a design by Henrik Steffens Sibbern. The medieval manor of Årsmarke, with its more than 300 years of history, was once Denmark's largest private estate; it is now part of Knuthenborg Safaripark. The exotic shrubs and trees planted during the era of the Counts of Knuthenborg are situated on the grounds.

== Geography ==
The 800-hectare (2,000-acre) estate is surrounded by beech forests. Since 1969, Knuthenborg Safari Park has attracted large numbers of visitors who come to see some 40 species of exotic animals and birds as well as special attractions for children.

== History ==
First mentioned in 1372, Aarsmarke was owned by the Urne family from 1527. Under King Frederick III, Cornelius Pederson Lerche was granted ownership of the estate in 1667. In 1677, his daughter Sister Lerche married the Mecklenburg nobleman Christoffer von Knuth who, on inheriting Aarsmarke, did much to improve it through extensions and increased prosperity. In 1714, their son Adam Christoffer von Knuth was elevated to the status of a count under Frederick IV which resulted in the change of name of the estate to Knuthenborg.

== Buildings ==
An older residence was still standing when the current structure was under construction. Today's manor house, also known as Enkesædet, was built by the architect Henrik Steffens Sibbern in 1866 in the Victorian style and was extended in 1886. A tower of French design with a pointed spire crowns one of its corners. Several other interesting buildings on the estate were built by Sibbern in the 1860s and 1870s, all with distinct appearances and features. Egehuset (the Oak House) in the Swiss style looks a little like a Tyrolean chalet. Flinterhuset (the Flint House), built literally in flint, is the most elaborate building with many fireplaces and chimneys true to the English tradition. The imposing Godsforvalterboligen (Forest Superintendent's Residence) is accessed through the corner tower. Sibbern also built Maglemerporten, the majestic main gatehouse and porter's residence while Vilhelm Tvede (1826–1891) added the gatehouses at Snapind.

== Park ==
It was Eggert Knuth (1838–1874) who called upon the English landscape architect Edward Milner to lay out the park in the late 1860s, creating artificial lakes fed by streams running through the estate. During his travels to England, Knuth visited nurseries where he purchased rare trees, plants and seeds which he sent back to his estate. Nils Stenson was then working as the Chief Landscape Gardener to the Count of Kunthenborg. His son, Herman Stenson, who was assisting his father as a young boy and grew up in the estate's Hunting pavilion, had also made very lovely drawings of the Kunthenborg palace and the garden. Eggert Knuth died in 1870 at the young age of 36, when the basic layout had been completed as can be seen from a relatively simple map dated 1881. Many of the finer details from Milner's original design were missing but today's garden nevertheless reflects his general concept. Adam V. Knuth who succeeded Eggert added the fanciful ruin near the main entrance, typical of the follies in English gardens of the times. In 1926, the park was the first of its kind to be listed. As a result, it was opened to visitors and further developed, especially, with large displays of rhododendrons. In addition to beech, there are oak, poplar, and coniferous trees, and a Sequoia gigantea. The property is encircled by a wall of granite, 7.2 kilometres (4 1/2 mi) in length, and 2.0 metres (6 1/2 ft) in height.

== Owners ==
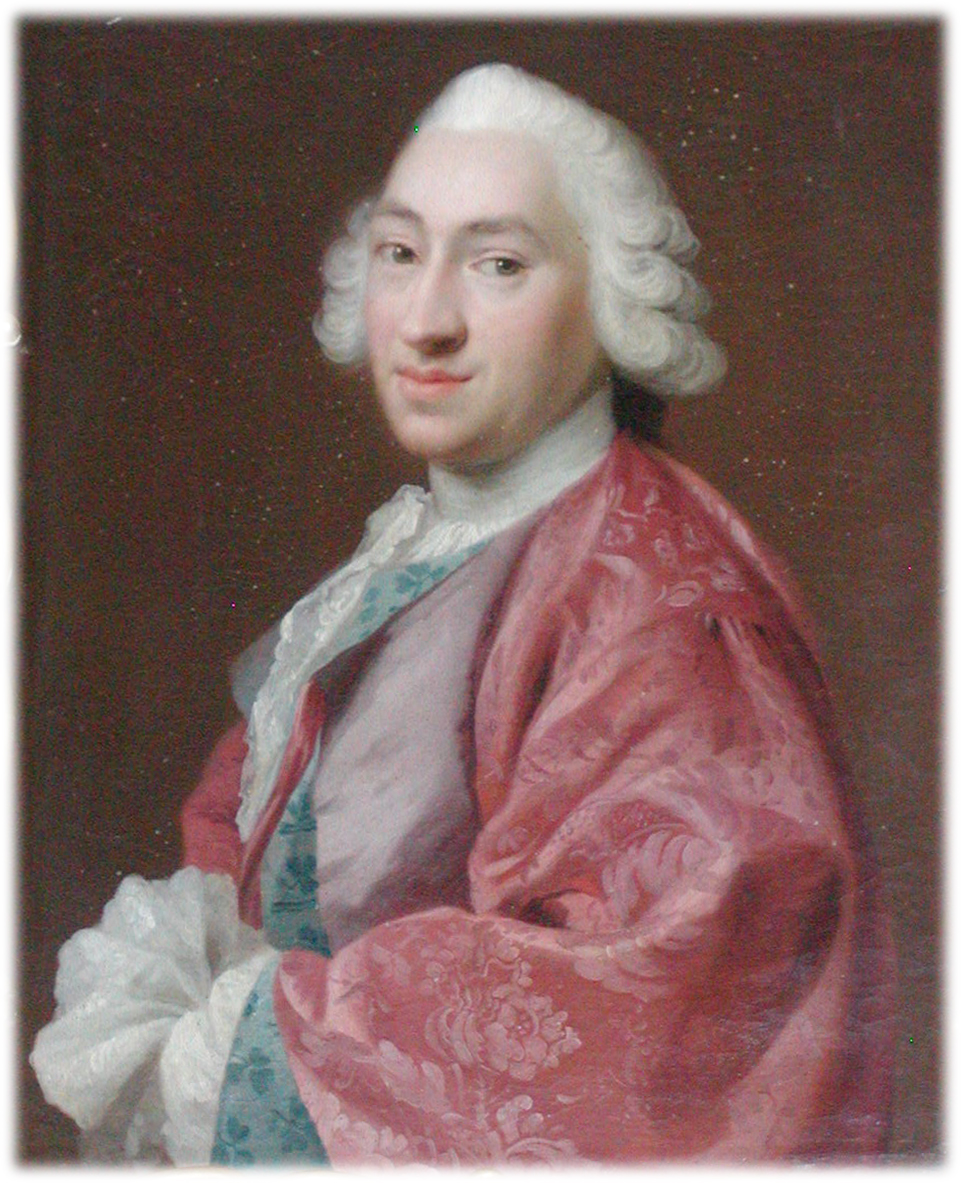
Eggert Christopher Knuth til Knuthenborg (1722–1776)

There are full records of the owners of Knuthenborg since the 14th century:

- (1372–1425) Niels Sivertsen Grubendal
- (1425–1465) Hans Albreckt Nielsen Grubendal
- (1465–1500) Jørgen Olsen Baad
- (1500–1527) Albreckt Jørgensen Baad
- (1527–1543) Knud Jørgensen Urne
- (1543–1552) Hans Knudsen Urne
- (1552–1577) Axel Knudsen Urne
- (1577–1622) Knud Axelsen Urne
- (1622–1663) Christopher Knudsen Urne
- (1663–1667) Christopher Knudsen Urnes dødsbo
- (1667–1681) Cornelius Pedersen Lerche
- (1681) Søster Corneliusdatter Lerche married von Knuth
- (1681–1697) Eggert Christopher von Knuth
- (1697–1714) Søster Corneliusdatter Lerche
- (1714–1736) Adam Christopher Knuth
- (1736–1747) Ide Margrethe Reventlow married von Knuth
- (1747–1776) Eggert Christopher Knuth (1722-1776)
- (1776–1802) Johan Henrik Knuth
- (1802–1818) Frederik Knuth
- (1818–1856) Frederik Marcus Knuth (1813-1856)
- (1856–1876) Eggert Christopher Knuth (1838-1874)
- (1876–1888) Adam Wilhelm Knuth (1854-1888)
- (1888–1920) Eggert Knuth
- (1920–1967) Frederik Marcus Knuth (1904–1970)
- (1967–1970) Frederik Marcus Knuth / Adam Wilhelm Knuth (born 1933)
- (1970–1987) Adam Wilhelm Josef Knuth
- (1987–2001) Adam Wilhelm Josef Knuth / Charlotte Birgitte Bille-Brahe-Selby
- (2001–2006) Adam Wilhelm Josef Knuth / Charlotte Birgitte Bille-Brahe-Selby / Adam Christoffer Knuth
- (2006–) Adam Christoffer Knuth
