= Roskilde County =

Coordinates: 55°39′N 12°05′E

Roskilde County Roskilde Amt (Danish)
- County of Denmark
- Coat of arms

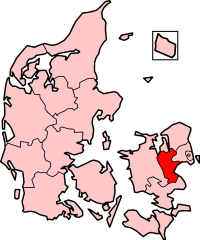
- Roskilde County in Denmark
- Seat: Roskilde

Area
  - Total: 891 km^{2} (344 sq mi)

Population (2006)
  - Total: 241,523
  - Density: 271/km^{2} (702/sq mi)

Roskilde County (Danish: Roskilde Amt) is a former county (Danish: amt) on the island of Zealand (Sjælland) in eastern Denmark. The county was abolished from 1 January 2007, when it merged into Region Sjælland (i.e. Region Zealand).

Roskilde is also the name of the county's capital, and the name of a municipality (Danish: kommune). The small city of Roskilde is located 30 km west of Copenhagen. Danish kings were traditionally crowned there, in the Roskilde Cathedral. Roskilde is also home to the Viking Ship Museum, an "alternative" university, and the popular Roskilde Festival, annual music festival.

== Municipalities (1970-2006) ==
- Bramsnæs
- Greve
- Gundsø
- Hvalsø
- Køge
- Lejre
- Ramsø
- Roskilde
- Skovbo
- Solrød
- Vallø

== List of county governors ==
| Portrait | Incumbent | Term | Notes |
|---|---|---|---|
| | Ove Skade | 1660–1661 | |
| | Johan Christopher Körbitz | 1662–1682 | |
| | Otto Krabbe | 1682–1717 | |
| | Frederik Christian Adeler | 1717–1721 | |
| | Rudolph von Gersdorff | 1721–1729 | |
| | Christian Frederik Holstein | 1729–1730 | |
| | Johan Ludvig Holstein | 1730–1735 | |
| | Frederik Oertz | 1734—1737 | |
| | Adolf Andreas von der Lühe | 1737—1750 | |
| | Holger Skeel | 1750–1764 | |
| | Eggert Christopher Knuth | 1764–1776 | |
| | Henrik Adam Brockenhuus | 1776–1787 | |
| | Werner Jasper Andreas Moltke | 1787—1796 | |
| | Johan Henrik Knuth | 1796—1799 | Acting county governor |
| | Michael Treschow | 1799—1808 | |
| | Johan Henrik Knuth | 1799—1802 | |
| | Frederik Hauch | 1802—1810 | |
| | Werner Jasper Andreas Moltke | 1810—1816 | |
| | Christopher Schøller Bülow | 1816—1821 | |
| | Frederik von Lowzow | 1821—1831 | |
| | Julius Knuth | 1831—1845 | |
| | Henrik Moltke | 1845—1847 | |
| | Peter Tetens | 1847—1859 | |
