= List of county governors of Copenhagen =

This list of county governors of Copenhagen lists county governors (Danish: Amtmand) of Copenhagen County, Denmark.

== List ==
Portrait	Incumbent	Term	Notes
	Johan Christoph von Körbitz	1658—1682	
	Adam Levin Knuth	1682—1699	
	Knud Juel	1699—1709	
	Iver Rosenkrantz	1709—1723	
	Hans Seidelin	1724—1730	
	Johan Ludvig Holstein	1730—1735	
	Niels Gersdorff	1735—1748	
	Conrad Ditlev Reventlow	1749—1750	
	Christian Siegfried Scheel von Plessen	1750—1752	
	Christian Ulrich Nissen	1752—1756	
	Jens Krag-Juel-Vind	1756—1769	
	Christian Lebrecht von Prøck	1769—11771	
	Christian Ludvig Scheel von Plessen	1771—1799	
	Johan Henrik Knuth	1799—1802	
	Frederik Hauch	1802—1810	
	Werner Jasper Andreas Moltke	1810—1816	
	Christopher Schøller Bülow	1816—1821	
	Frederik von Lowzow	1821—1831	
	Julius Knuth	1831—1845	
	Henrik Moltke	1845—1847	
	Peter Tetens	1847—1859	
