= Johan Henrik Knuth =

Count and diocesan governor of Zealand

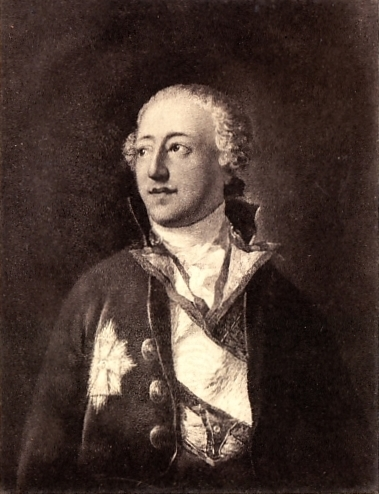

Diocesan Governor of Zealand
- In office 1790–17802
- Monarch: Christian VII
- Preceded by: Gregers Christian Haxthausen
- Succeeded by: Frederik Hauch
- Constituency: Diocese of Zealand

Personal details
- Born: 22 August 1746 Copenhagen, Denmark
- Died: 12 July 1802 (aged 55) Copenhagen, Denmark
- Occupation: Diocesan governor

Johan Henrik (Heinrich) Knuth (22 August 1746 – 12 July 1802) was a Danish nobleman and the third Count of Knuthenborg. He served as Diocesan Governor of Zealand and the Faroe Islands from 1790 until his death. He also served as county governor (Danish: amtmand) of Roskilde County (1796–1799) and Copenhagen County (1800–1802).

== Early life and education ==
Knuth was born on 22 August 1746 to Eggert Christopher Knuth (1722–1887) and Marguerite Maurice Francoise de Monteleone (1723–1752). He was appointed chamberlain (kammerherre) in 1772. In 1777, he was created a White Knight. In 1780, he was appointed as Danish envoy at the Prince-elector's court (det kurfyrsteligge hof).

== Career ==
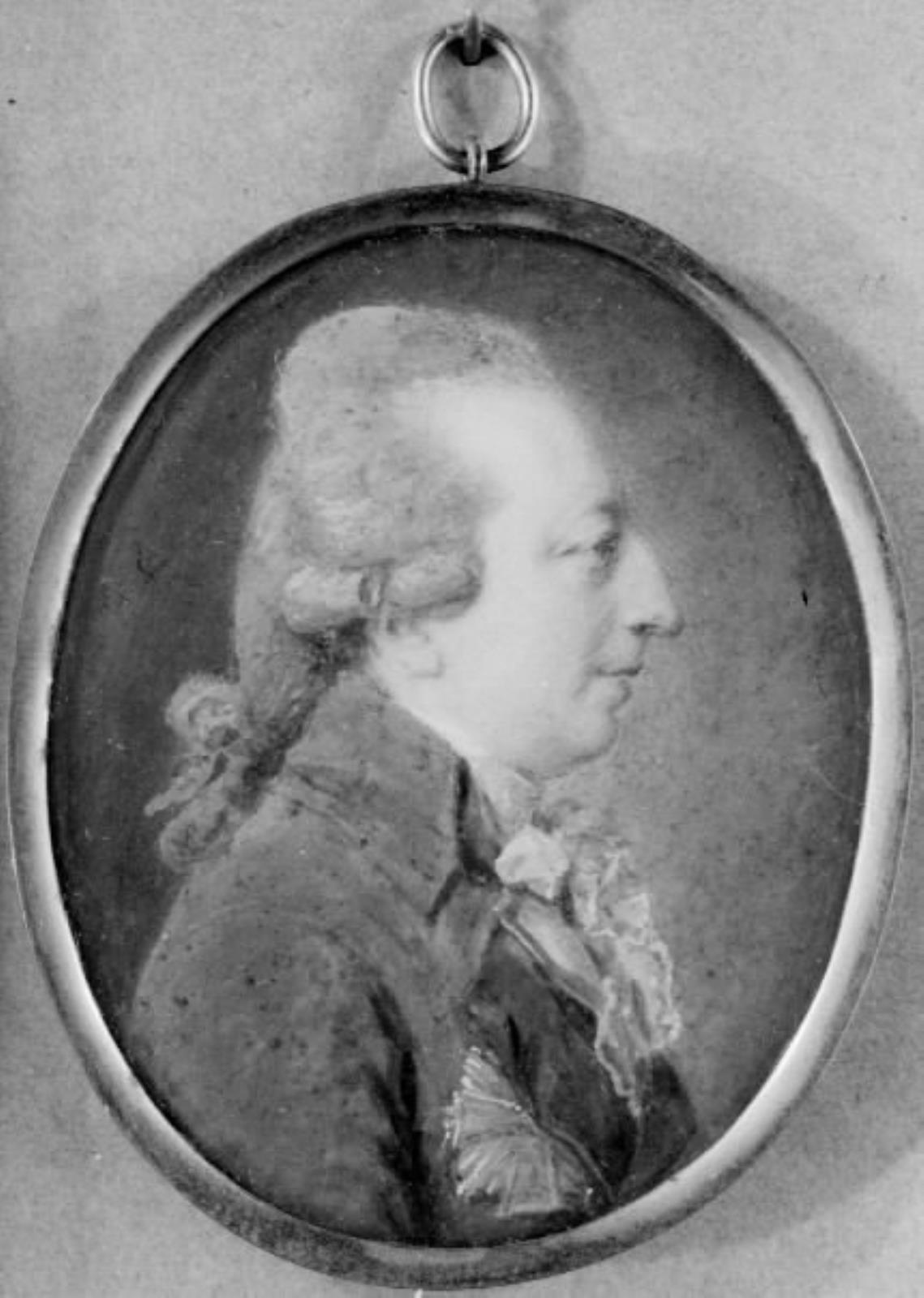
Miniature portrait of Johan Henrik Knut painted by Cornelius Høyer.

Knuth succeeded his father to the counties of Knuthenborg and Gyldensten in 1776. In 1796, he was awarded the title of gehejmeråd.

On 26 May 1790, he was appointed as Prefect (stiftsamtmand) of the Diocese of Zealand ( and the Faroe Islands. On 27 May 1796, he was appointed as county governor (amtmand) of the Roskilde County. On 28 December 1799, he was appointed county governor of the Copenhagen County, with effect from January 1800.

== Personal life ==
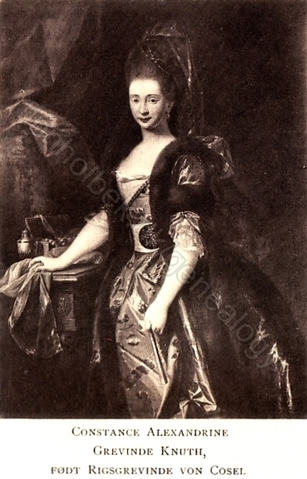
Constantia Alexandrina Knuth, née von Cosel.

On 26 February 1772 in Dresden, he married Constance Alexandrine von Cosel (1756–1804).

He was survived by four daughters; his only son had already died in 1782. Therefore, his brother inherited his title and the county of Knuthenborg.

Civic offices
Preceded by Gregers Christian Haxthausen	Prefect of Zealand; 1790–1802	Succeeded by Frederik Hauch
Preceded by Gregers Christian Haxthausen	Prefect of the Faroe Islands; 1790–1802	Succeeded by Frederik Hauch
Preceded by Werner Jasper Andreas Moltke	County Governor of Roskilde County; 1796–1802	Succeeded by Michael Treschow
Preceded by Christian Ludvig Scheel von Plessen	County Governor of Copenhagen County; 1800–1799	Succeeded by Frederik Hauch
