= Hauch =

Hauch may refer to:

- Carsten Hauch (1790–1872), Danish poet, son of Frederik Hauch
- Frederik Hauch (1754–1839), Danish postmaster general, father of Carsten Hauch
- HDMS Hauch, a gunboat serving the Royal Danish Navy
- Wes Hauch, a guitarist for the American technical death metal band The Faceless
