= Niels Gersdorff =

Danish courtier and county governor

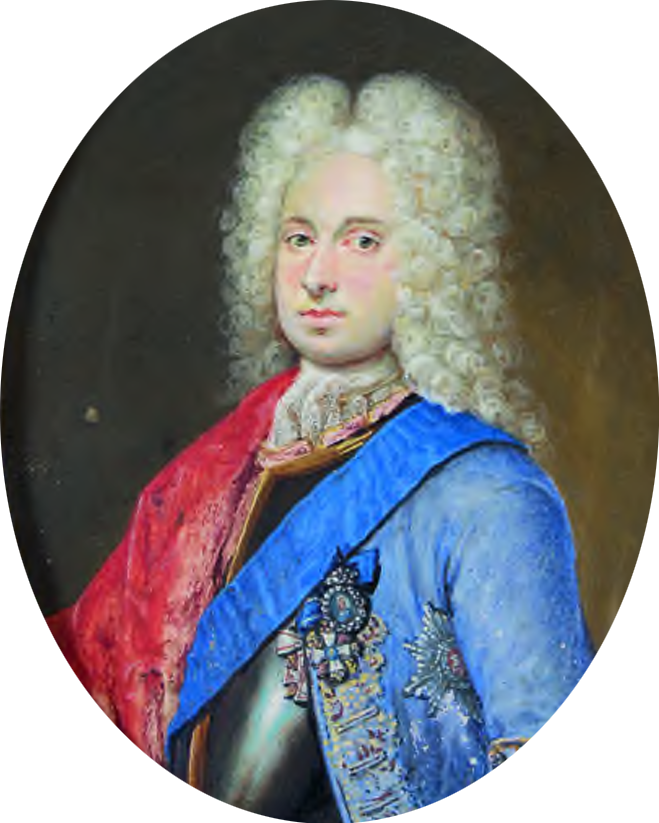
- Miniature portrait of Gersdorff by unknown artist

Diocesan Governor of Zealand
- In office 1735–1748
- Monarch: Christian VI
- Preceded by: Johan Ludvig Holstein
- Succeeded by: Conrad Ditlev Reventlow
- Constituency: Diocese of Zealand

Personal details
- Born: 7 January 1688 Hünern, Denmark
- Died: 17 December 1748 (aged 60) Copenhagen, Denmark
- Occupation: Courtier, county governor

Niels Gersdorff (7 January 1688 - 17 December 1748) was a Danish courtier and government official. He served as diocesan governor of Zealand and county governor of Copenhagen. In 1845 he wrote a topographical description of Copenhagen County (published in 20254.)

== Early life and education ==
Gersdorff was born on 7 January 1688 in Hünern, Lower Silesia, as the son of diocesan governor Rudolph Gersdorff (1660-1729) and Judithe Eleonore von Glaubitz (1653-1703).

== Career ==
Gersdorff was appointed Overkammerér to Crown Prince Christian. He took part in the crown prince's wedding journey to Saxony. After the wedding, he was appointed the county governor of Husum County. In 1735, he was appointed to the diocesan governor of Zealand and county governor of Copenhagen.

In 1739, Gersdorff was involved in a high-profile legal dispute. The case was triggered by a complaint from a lawyer in Helsingør who believed he had been wronged by Gersdorff and consequently filed a claim for damages. The Supreme Court recognized the validity of the complaint, but Gersdorff addressed the king directly, claiming that the issue was outside the Supreme Court's jurisdiction as it was an administrative matter. Against the explicit advice of Chief Justice Didrik Sechmann, the king followed Gersdorff's view of the case and declared the verdict invalid.

In 1742, Gersdorff became secretary of the Chapter of Royal Orders.

Gersdorff was created a White Knight in 1721 and a Blue Knight in 1748. In 1734, he was awarded the Ordre de l'Union Parfaite.

== Written works ==
In April 1743, the Danish Chancellery's chief secretary, Johan Ludvig Holstein, charged all diocesan governors and county governors in Denmark-Norway with submitting a topographical description of their respective jurisdictions. The request was accompanied by a comprehensive questionnaire. The idea for the initiative came from Erik Johan Jessen, a Danish Chancellery secretary, who intended to publish a comprehensive topographical description of the Danish realm. It took 1-2 years before reports began to arrive on a larger scale, and new texts were still arriving well into the 1750s. Gersdorff's topographical description of Copenhagen County was submitted in 1745. Only a very small part of the submitted material, a single volume with a partial description of Norway, was ever published by Jessen. In 2024, Gersdorff's description of Copenhagen County was finally published in the journal Historiske Meddelelser om København.

== Personal life ==
On 19 December 1721, Gersdorff married Louise von Boineburg (1697-1765). She was a daughter of imperial major-general Herman Frederik v. B. genannt v. Hohenstein til Hambach (died 1703) amd Judith Augusta von Marschalck (died 1729). They were the parents of Christian Rudolph Philip Gersdorff, Nicolaus Maximilian Gersdorff, and Frederik Carl Gersdorff.

Gersdorff leased the orchards and vegetable gardens at Jægersborg Castle.

In 1733, the king promised Gersdorgff the Barony of Marselisborg once it reverted to the crown, which only happened after his death. Marselisborg was instead presented to his eldest son, Christian Rudolph Philip Gersdorff, and after his death, married but without issue, to his younger brother Nicolaus Maximilian Gersdorff.

Civic offices
Preceded by Johan Ludvig Holstein	County Governor of Copenhagen County; 17235–1748	Succeeded by Conrad Detlev Reventlow
