= Christian Siegfried Scheel von Plessen =

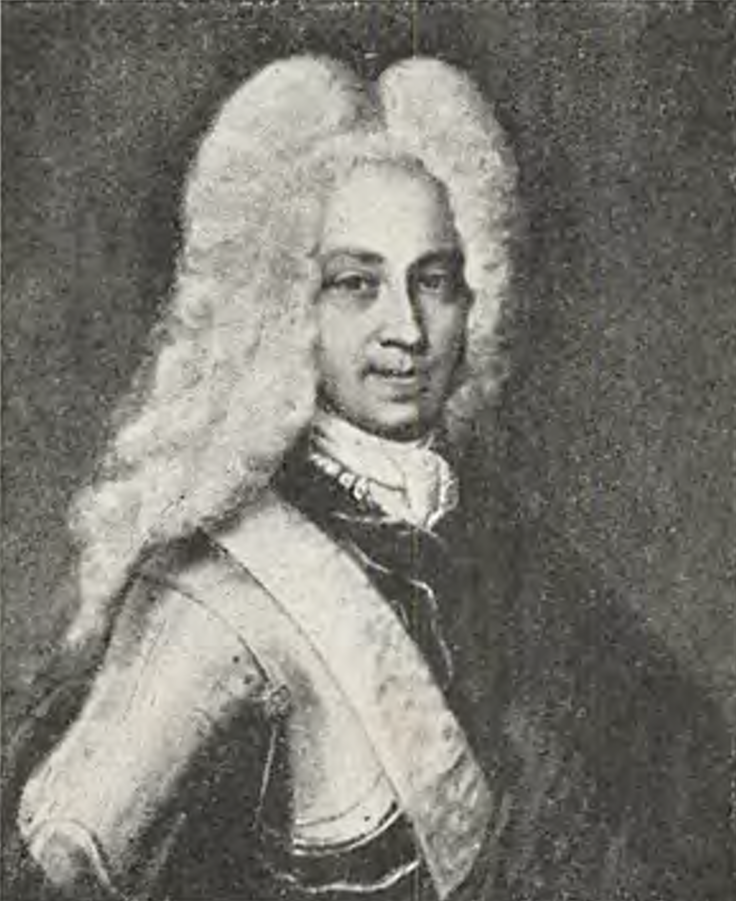
Christian Siegfried Scheel von Plessen

Christian Siegfried (Sigfred) Scheel von Plessen (1716—1755), also referred to as Christian Siegfried von Plessen or Christian Siegfried Scheel-Plessen, was a Danish army officer, county governor and landowner. He owned Glorup Manor on Funen. He was married to Louise von Plessen.

== Early life and education ==
Plessen was born on 10 June 1716 to Christian Ludvig von Plessen and Charlotte Amalie Skeel. He studied in Leipzig in 1735.

== Career ==
Plessen became a junior court official (Danish: Kammerjunker) in 1737. In the same year, he became a captain in the Royal Life Guard Regiment. On 20 June 1742, he became a chamberlain. On 9 November 1746, he was promoted to major in the Royal Life Guards on Foot. In 1748, he was transferred to an infantry regiment, now with rank of colonel.

On 15 October 1650, he left the army to assume a position as county governor of Copenhagen. He also served as a financial councillor (deputeret for finanserne). On 4 September 1752, he was created a Knight of the Order of the Dannebrog. He was replaced as county governor of Copenhagen just two weeks later due to poor health.

== Property ==
Plessen succeeded his father to Glorup on Funen. His brother, Mogens Scheel-Plessen, who became Lord Master of Ceremonies at the royal court, inherited Fussingø, Lindholm and Selsø.

== Personal life ==
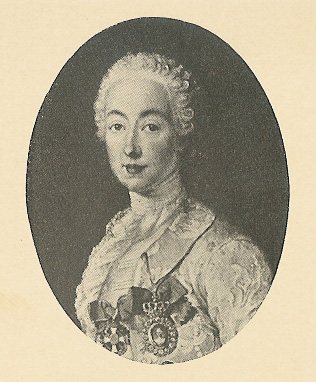
Louise von Plessen

On 11 March 1744, Plessen married Louise Berckentin (1725–1799). She was a daughter of Minister of State Christian August Berckentin and Susanne Margrethe von Boisenburg. She served as chief court mistress to Queen Caroline Mathilde. Plessen and his wife had no children.

Plessen died on 2 April 1755. His wife survived him by 44 years.

Civic offices
Preceded by Conrad Detlev Reventlow	County Governor of Copenhagen County; 17250–1752	Succeeded by Ulrik Christian Nissen
