= Vibeke Storm Rasmussen =

Danish politician

Vibeke Storm Rasmussen (born 14 September 1945, in Copenhagen) is a Danish politician and the chairman of the Capital Region of Denmark from 2007 to 2014, elected for the Social Democrats. Prior to the establishment of the regions, she was mayor of Copenhagen County.

== Early life ==
Vibeke Storm Rasmussen is the daughter of chief mechanic Jørgen Rasmussen and nurse Birte Storm, and grew up on Amager. She graduated highschool in 1964, and in 1969 she finished her education as a public school teacher. Vibeke Storm Rasmussen has written several books and pamphlets on education. From 1974 to 1993, she worked in Ballerup Municipality as a consultant in the school system, focusing among other things on children from ethnic minorities and their school-related problems.

== Political career ==
After graduating she became a member of the Social Democratic Youth of Denmark. In 1974, she was elected to the city council in Albertslund Municipality as the only woman. She set up an interest group aimed at engaging more women in politics. She has run for parliament and sometimes served as a substitute therein, but her primary focus has been regional politics. In 1984, she was elected to the county council of Copenhagen County, and in 1992 became its first female county mayor. She was re-elected in 1997 and in 2001, continuing until the county was disbanded as a result of the Danish municipal reform.

In the first election for the council of the Capital Region of Denmark, in 2005, Vibeke Storm Rasmussen ran in the election as the leader of the Social Democrats. She received 47,000 personal votes. Having formed an agreement with the Socialist People's Party and the Red-Green Alliance, she became the first chairman of the Capital Region of Denmark, as well as the first female regional chairman in Denmark.

She did not run for election in November 2013. Instead Sophie Hæstorp Andersen (born 26 September 1974 in Copenhagen) ran as the leader of the Social Democrats and was elected as chairman of the regional council. Sophie is one of two regional chairmen who are women.
