= Diocese of Zealand =

Former diocese of the Church of Denmark (1537–1922)

The Diocese of Zealand (Danish: Sjællands Stift) was a Lutheran diocese in Denmark that existed from 1537 to 1922. The diocese had been formed in 1537 following the Reformation of Denmark, and was dissolved in 1922 when it was divided into the Diocese of Copenhagen and the Diocese of Roskilde. While it existed, the diocese functioned as the head of the Church of Denmark, beneath the crown, and its bishop was regarded as Primus inter pares.

== History ==
The Diocese of Zealand was established in 1537 following the Reformation. During the Reformation, the former Catholic bishops in Denmark—who had led the country's dioceses—were removed from their positions and their property was confiscated by the Crown. From that point onward the monarch of Denmark functioned as the head of the newly formed Church of Denmark. At the onset of the church, bishops were officially styled as superintendents, to reflect their diminished authority beneath the crown, though this proved temporary. The title of archbishop was also abolished with the reformation, though the Bishop of Zealand was considered primus inter pares, and regarded as the head of the church beneath the authority of the crown.

The diocese of Zealand replaced the Catholic Diocese of Roskilde, though it maintained much of its infrastructure. The Roskilde Cathedral remained the diocese's central cathedral and the official residence of the bishop remained in Copenhagen, as had been the case for his Catholic predecessors, although it moved to the former city hall, now known as Bispegården, which translates literally to the Bishop's House.

Apart from the island of Zealand, from which the diocese took its name, the diocese covered Møn, Amager and various smaller islands in the area. Various dependencies and distant islands also fell under the diocese's jurisdiction, including the Faroe Islands, the Danish colonies in Greenland, and other overseas territories. The island of Bornholm was included in 1662, following the 1660 Treaty of Copenhagen which ceded the rest of the Diocese of Lund to Sweden.

In 1922, the diocese was divided into the Diocese of Copenhagen and the Diocese of Roskilde. Harald Ostenfeld, the last Bishop of Zealand, continued as the Bishop of Copenhagen while Henry Fonnesbech-Wulff became the Bishop of Roskilde.

== Bishops of Zealand ==
- 1537–1560 Peder Palladius
- 1560–1569 Hans Albertsen
- 1569–1590 Poul Madsen
- 1590–1614 Peder Jensen Vinstrup, not to be confused with his son Peder Pedersen Winstrup (1605–1679)
- 1614–1638 Hans Poulsen Resen
- 1638–1652 Jesper Rasmussen Brochmand
- 1652–1653 Hans Hansen Resen
- 1653–1655 Laurids Mortensen Scavenius
- 1655–1668 Hans Svane (titular Archbishop)
- 1668–1675 Hans Wandal
- 1675–1693 Hans Bagger
- 1693–1710 Henrik Bornemann
- 1710–1737 Christen Worm
- 1737–1757 Peder Hersleb
- 1757–1783 Ludvig Harboe (Hersleb's son-in-law)
- 1783–1808 Nicolai Edinger Balle (Harboe's son-in-law)
- 1808–1830 Friedrich Christian Carl Hinrich Münter
- 1830–1834 Peter Erasmus Müller
- 1834–1854 Jacob Peter Mynster
- 1854–1884 Hans Lassen Martensen
- 1884–1895 Bruun Juul Fog
- 1895–1909 Thomas Skat Rørdam
- 1909–1911 Peder Madsen
- 1911–1922 Harald Ostenfeld

== List of prefects (Stiftamtmænd) ==
- 1660–1661 Ove Skade
- 1662–1682 Johan Christopher Körbitz
- 1682–1717 Otto Krabbe
- 1717–1721 Frederik Christian Adeler
- 1721–1729 Rudolph von Gersdorff
- 1729–1730 Christian Frederik Holstein
- 1730–1735 Johan Ludvig Holstein
- 1735–1748 Niels Gersdorff
- 1749–1750 Conrad Ditlev Reventlow
- 1750–1750 Adolph Andreas von der Lühe
- 1750–1764 Holger Skeel
- 1764–1776 Eggert Christopher Knuth
- 1776–1787 Henrik Adam Brockenhuus
- 1787–1790 Gregers Christian Haxthausen
- 1790–1802 Johan Henrik Knuth
- 1802–1810 Frederik Hauch
- 1810–1816 Werner Jasper Andreas Moltke
- 1816–1821 Christopher Schøller Bülow
- 1821–1831 Frederik von Lowzow
- 1831–1850 Julius Knuth
- 1850–1859 Peter Tetens
- 1859–1872 Carl Simony
- 1873–1889 Johan Christian Bille-Brahe
- 1889–1909 Christian Bache
- 1909–1911 Frederik de Jonquières
- 1911–1915 Anders Dybdal
- 1915–1922 Emil Ammentorp (Continued in the Dioceses of Copenhagen and Roskilde)

== See also ==
- Church of Denmark
- Diocese of Copenhagen
