= Jesper Brochmand =

Danish clergyman (1585–1652)

- Bishop of Zealand
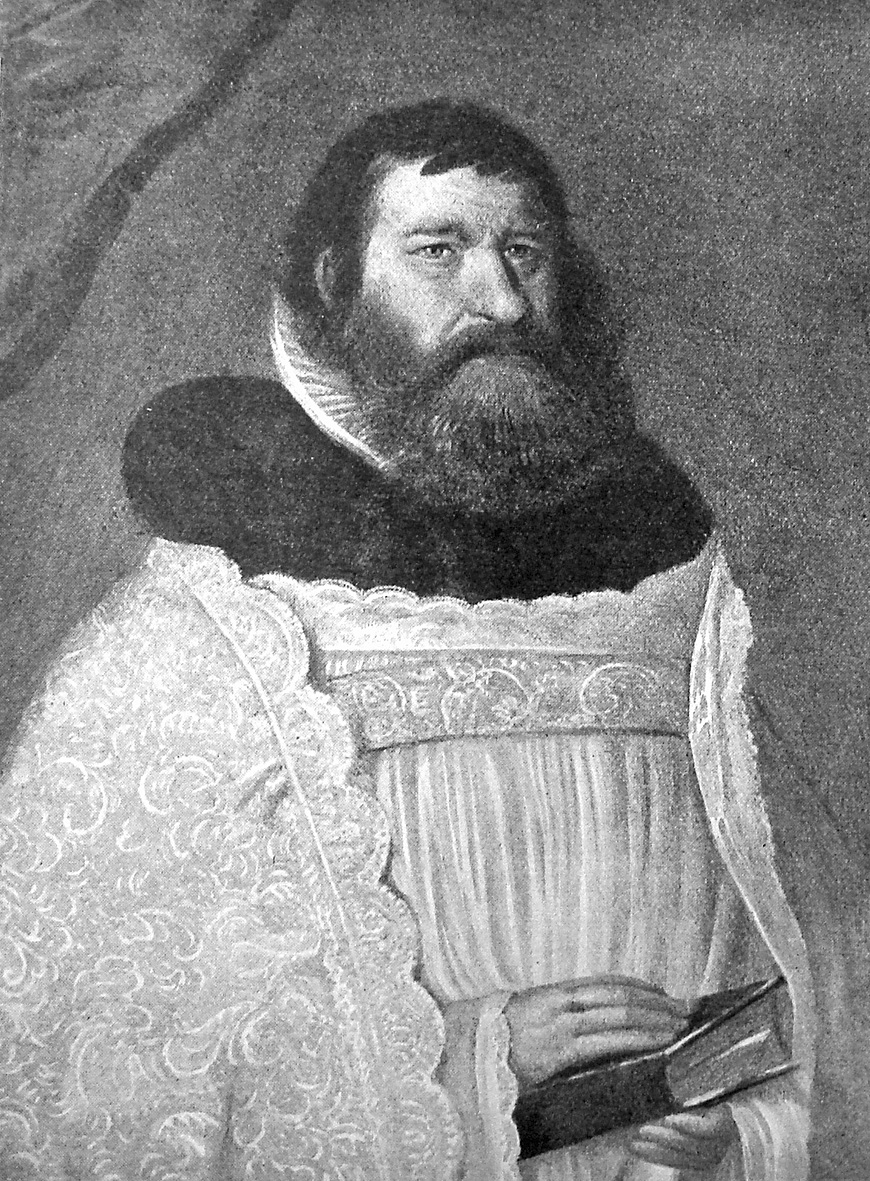
- Church: Church of Denmark
- In office: 1638–1652
- Predecessor: Hans Poulsen Resen
- Successor: Hans Hansen Resen

Personal details
- Born: 5 August 1585 Køge, Denmark-Norway
- Died: 19 April 1652 (aged 66) Copenhagen
- Denomination: Lutheranism
- Education: Leiden University; University of Franeker

Jesper Rasmussen Brochmand (5 August 1585 - 19 April 1652) was a Danish Lutheran clergyman, theologian and professor who served as Bishop of the Diocese of Zealand from 1638 until his death.

Brochmand was a key founder of the dogmatic system that formed the basis for the lutheran orthodoxy in Denmark.

== Biography ==
Jesper Rasmussen Brochmand was born in Køge, Zealand. He attended Herlufsholm Academy in Copenhagen, followed by training as a theological student in the Netherlands at Leiden University and the University of Franeker. He returned to Copenhagen in 1608 to serve as Rector of Herlufsholm Academy. In 1610, he became a Professor Pædagogicus at University of Copenhagen, professor of Greek in 1613 and a member of the theological faculty in 1615. In 1617 he was appointed tutor to Crown Prince Christian, eldest son of King Christian IV, returning to the university three years later.

He was ordained Bishop of Zealand (Bisperække for Sjællands stift) in 1639. During his long and fruitful activity in this office, he reorganized the worship service of the Church of Denmark, especially by abolishing the Latin choir and by introducing Wednesday services during Lent.

At this same time, Denmark-Norway was effected by the Counter-Reformation efforts of the Roman Catholic Church through propaganda generated by the scholastic revival. Brochmand made the controversy with Rome a subject of his public lectures. In 1626–28, he published his Controversiæ sacræ (3 parts), a reply in the style of Lutheran scholasticism to Cardinal Bellarmine's attacks on the Lutheran Church. In 1634, at the king's order, he engaged in a polemic with the Jesuits, who endeavored to defend the conversion of Christian William, Margrave of Brandenburg to Roman Catholicism.

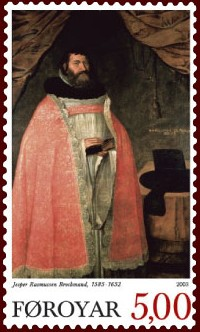
Bishop Brochmand featured on Postverk Føroya stamp, 2003

Against this pamphlet Brochmand delivered a series of lectures which, after his death, were collected and published under the title Apologiæ, speculi veritatis confutatio (1653). His reputation as a dogmatist was established by his Systema universae theologiae (2 vols., 1633) in which he proved himself a firm opponent, not only of the Roman Catholics, but also of Calvinism. He wrote several devotional works, of which his Sabbati sanctificatio was for more than two centuries a favorite collection of sermons with the Danish people.

== Legacy ==
The street Jesper Brochmands Gade in Copenhagen's Nørrebro district is named after him. He has also been depicted on the Faroese stamp.

== Selected works ==
- Controversiarum sacrarum Pars I (1626)
- Controversiarum sacrarum Pars II (1627)
- Controversiarum sacrarum Pars III: Akropolis pontificatus (1628)
- Systema universae theologiae didacticae, polemicae, moralis (1633)
- Lychnos logou prophetikou oppositus veritatis pontificiae speculo (1634)
- Päpstischer Warheit (1638)
- Sabbati sanctificatio aller Gudelig Betaenkning over alle Evangelier og Epistler paa Sondage og alle hellige Dage (1638)
- Apologiae speculi veritatis confutatio (1653)

== Related Reading ==
- Dahl, Gina (2010) Book Collections of Clerics in Norway, 1650–1750 (Brill Academic Pub) ISBN 9789004188990
- Kolb, Robert (2008) Lutheran Ecclesiastical Culture, 1550-1675 (Brill Academic Pub) ISBN 978-9004166417
- Garstein, Oskar (1992) Rome and the Counter-Reformation in Scandinavia (Brill Academic Pub) ISBN 978-9004093959
- Grell, Ole Peter (1995) The Scandinavian Reformation. From evangelical movement to institutionalization of reform (Cambridge University Press) ISBN 9780521441629
