= Gregers Christian Haxthausen =

Danish courtier and county governor (1732–1802)

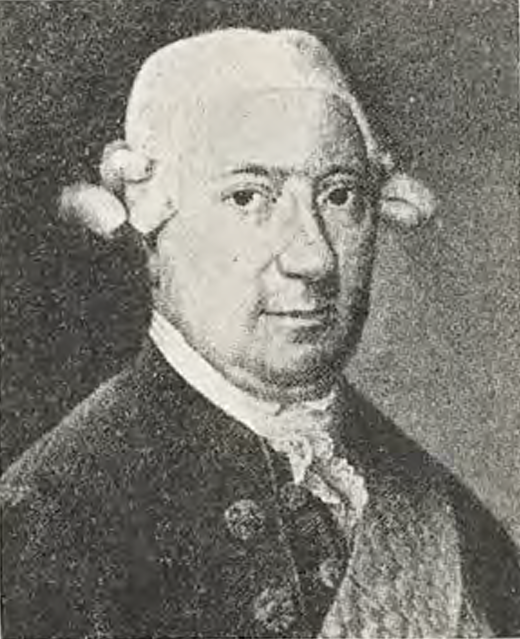

Diocesan Governor of Zealand
- In office 1776–17790
- Monarch: Christian VII
- Preceded by: Henrik Brockenhuus
- Succeeded by: Johan Henrik Knuth
- Constituency: Diocese of Zealand

Personal details
- Born: 1 January 1733 Copenhagen, Denmark
- Died: 10 July 1802 (aged 69) Copenhagen, Denmark
- Occupation: Diocesan governor

Gregers Christian Haxthausen (1 February 1733 – 10 July 1802) was a Danish government official. He was one of the few Danish noblemen whom Johan Peter Suhr entrusted with a number of important posts and tasks. After Struense's fall, he was initially removed from the central administration. After some ten years as county governor in the provinces, first in Flensburg and then in Sorø and Ringsted, he was promoted to diocesan governor of Zealand. In November 1790, he made a come-back to the central administration as geheimestatsminister.

== Early life and education ==
Haxthausen was born on 1 February 1733 in Copenhagen, the son of Christian Friedrich von Haxthausen and Margrethe Hedevig Juel. The father was naturalized as a Danish count on 6 April 1736. Haxthausen's brother was lieutenant-general Clemens August Haxthausen. Karl Christian Gärtner was his hofmester from the age of six. He was later sent to school in Altona and Copenhagen before continuing his education at Sorø Academy and the university in Leipzig.

== Career ==
Haxthausen was appointed court page (kammerjunker) in 1749. He returned to the Danish court after completing his education in 1755.

In 1758, he was appointed envoyé extraordinaire at the Polish and Saxon court. Shortly prior to his departure, in early 1759, he was awarded the title of chamberlain (kammerherre). In 1760, he was transferred to Saint Petersburg. He replaced Wilhelm August von der Osten, who had fallen out of favour with Prince Peter (Peter III). After Peter III's fall, Haxthausen was again replaced by Osten.

After Haxthausen's return to Copenhagen in 1763 he was appointed to councillor (deputeret) in the Admiralitets- og Generalkommissariatskollegiet. In 1770, he was appointed 1st Councillor (førstedeputeret) in the combined Admiralitets- og Generalkommissariatskollegium. During Striense's de facto rule of Denmark, he was made a member of the Gehejmekonferencekommission. He was tasked with creating a plan for the improved management of the navy (together with Willebrandt). In 1771, he was appointed 1st Councillor (førstedeputeret) in the reorganized Admiralitets- og Kommissariatskollegium.

After Struense's fall, Haxthausen was dismissed from his posts in Copenhagen. He was instead appointed county governor of Flensburg and Bredsted counties. In 1784, he was appointed to county governor of Ringsted and Sorø counties, as well as overhofmester at Sorø Academy. In 1787, he was appointed to the more senior post of diocesan governor of Zealand and county governor of the Faroe Islands. In 1790, Haxthausen returned to the central administration. Back in 1784, Joachim Otto Schack-Rathlou had unsuccessfully tried to persuade the crown prince to make Haxthausen a member of the new Council of State. After Schack-Rathlou and Frederik Christian Rosenkrantz had resigned from the council in 1788, followed by Henrik Stampe's death one year later, the crown prince found it necessary to have the "Danish Party" represented in the government. On 27 November 1789, Haxthausen and Jørgen Erik Skeel were therefore appointed to the post of geheimestatsminister. In 1794, Haxthausen was also appointed as president of the Vestindisk-Guineisk Rente- og Generaltoldkammer. At the same time, he was appointed as one of the directors of the Postpensionskassen (Postal Pension Fund). Later in the same year, he was dismissed from all his posts.

== Personal life ==
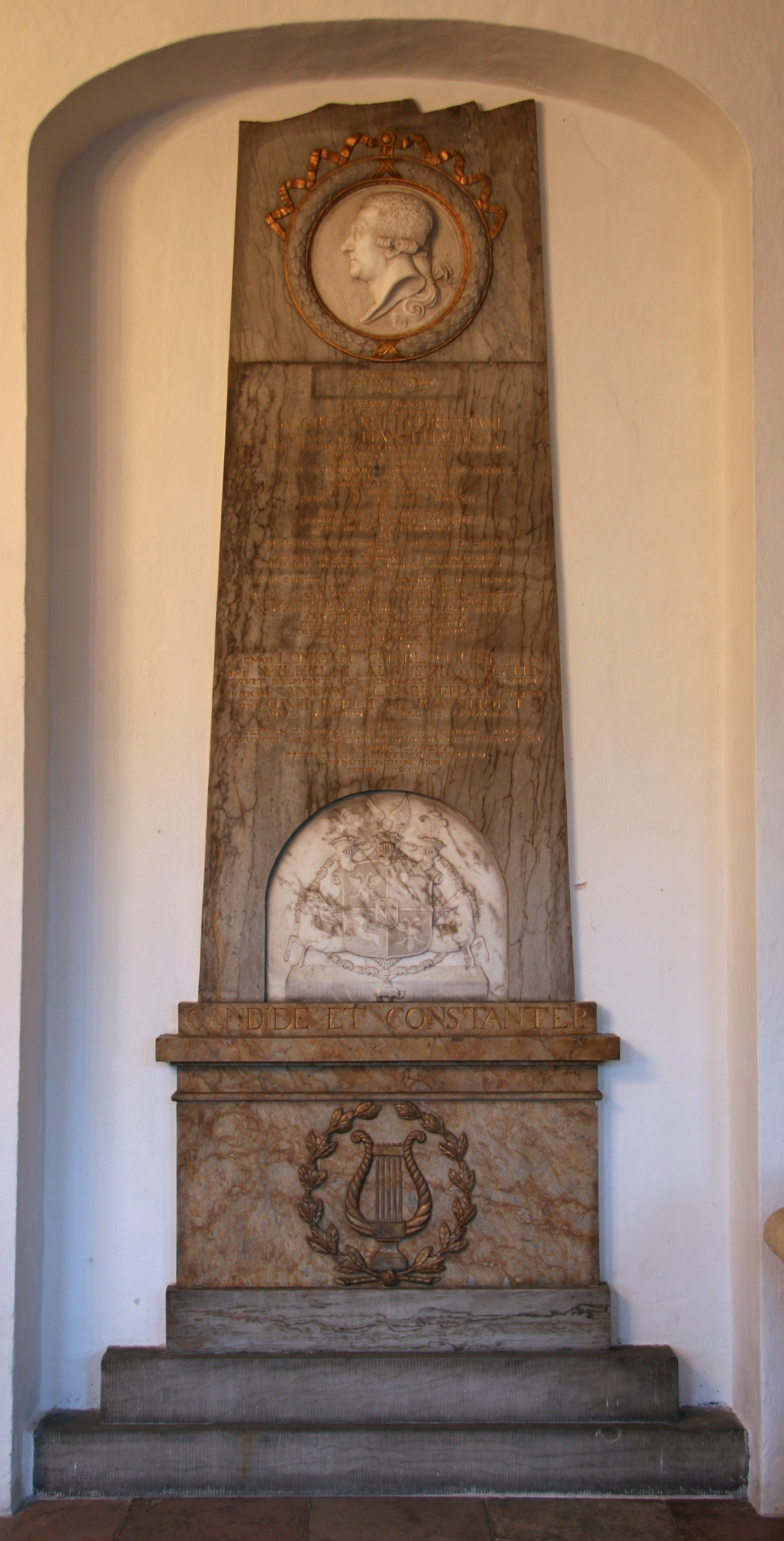
Epitaph to Haxthausen in Holmen Church in Copenhagen

Haxthausen was married twice. His first wife, Louise Charlotte Gräfin von der Osten (1735–1766), was the daughter of Wilhelm August von der Osten and Charlotte Amalie von Lützow. Their only child, a son, died as an infant. Louise Charlotte died at just 30 years old on 5 July 1766 at the country house Solitude. Haxthausen was then married for a second time to Anna Elisabeth Juul (1750–1813) on 18 September 1767. She was a daughter of Ove Frederiksen Juul and Sophie Hedevig Friis-Frijsenborg. He and Anna Elisabeth had six children.

In the 1760s, Haxthausen owned the country house Solitude in Nørrebro. His first wife died on the estate in 1766. In 1769, he sold it to the government and a Smallpox research institute was established on the site by Johann Friedrich Struensee and a Professor Berger. A newly invented inoculation method, which was a precursor to the modern smallpox vaccine, was tested there.

He later owned the property Amaliegade 22 next to Amalienborg Palace from at least 1787 until his death. He inherited the estate Tienhausen and Hemsen in present-day Germany.

He died on 10 July 1802. His sarcophagus, in reddish sandstone, stands in the Haxthausen family's crypt (No. 15) in Holmen Church. He is also commemorated by an epitaph in the church which features a portrait relief of him. His large book collection was sold at auction to the Royal Danish Library. The house on Amaliegade was still owned by his widow in 1806.

== Awards ==
In 1766, Haxthausen was created a Knight of the Order of the Dannebrog. In the same year, he was awarded the Ordre de l'Union Parfaite. In 1774, he was awarded the title of gehejmekonferensråd. In 1783, he was created a Knight in the Order of the Elephant.

Government offices
Preceded by Johan Albrecht With	County Governor of Flensburg Amt; 1738–1742	Succeeded by Cay Reventlow
Preceded by Carl Adolph Raben	County governor of Sorø Amt; 1784—1787	Succeeded by Vilhelm Mathias Skeel
Preceded by Carl Adolph Raben	County Governor of Ringsted Amt; 1784—1787	Succeeded by Vilhelm Mathias Skeel
Preceded by Henrik Brockenhuus	Diocesan Governor of Zealand Stiftamt; 1787&–1790	Succeeded by Johan Henrik Knuth
Preceded by Henrik Brockenhuus	County Governor of the Faroe Islands; 1787–1790	Succeeded by Johan Henrik Knuth
