= Henrik Brockenhuus =

Danish courtier

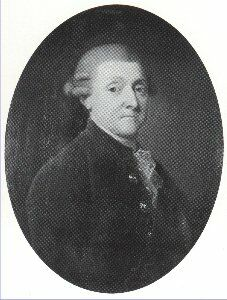

Diocesan Governor of Zealand
- In office 1776–1786
- Monarchs: Frederick V, Christian VII
- Preceded by: Eggert Christopher Knuth
- Succeeded by: Gregers Christian Haxthausen
- Constituency: Diocese of Zealand

Personal details
- Born: 30 May 1720 Vang, Norway; Denmark-Norway
- Died: 11 June 1803 (aged 83) Jungshoved, Denmark; Denmark-Norway
- Occupation: Supreme Court justice, diocesan governor and privy councillor

Henrik Adam Brockenhuus (30 May 1720 - 11 June 1803) was a Danish-Norwegian courtier, landowner and local administrator on Zealand. He owned the estates of Jungshoved, Oremandsgaard and Nysø. He served as prefect (amtmand/stiftsamtmand) of Vordingborg county from 1767 to 1776 and of the Diocese of Zealand from 1776 to 1787.

== Early life ==
Brockenhuus was born in Vang, just outside Hamar, in Norway. He was the son of colonel Jørgen Otto Brockenhuus (1664–1728) and his second wife Bertha (Barte) Magdalene Brockenhuus (1684–1769). As a young man he became a close friend of crown prince Frederick (V).

== Career and property ==
He was appointed to hofjunker in 1744, then stable master for the crown prince and squire (kammerjunker) in 1745 and finally chamberlain (kammerherre) in 1752.

In 1761, he purchased the estate of Jungshoved and Oremandsgaard near Præstø from the king. A few years later he also purchased Nysø Manor. In 1767, he was appointed to prefect (amtmand) of Vordingborg County and in 1776 he became prefect (Stiftsamtmand) of the Diocese of Zealand as well as curator of Vemmetofte. He was appointed to entlediget in 1787.

== Awards ==
In 1760, he was created a Knight of the Order of the Dannebrog. In 1767, he was awarded the Ordre de l'Union Parfaite. In 1773, he was created a Knight in the Order of the Elephant.

In 1760, he was awarded the title of Gehejmeråd. Ub 1779, he was awarded the more prestigious title of Gehejmekonferensråd

== Personal life ==
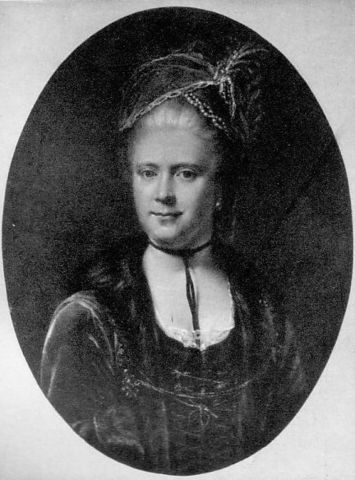
Hedevig Sophie Elisabeth Holstein-Ledreborg.

In 1757, Brockenhuus married to Hedevig Sophie Elisabeth Holstein-Ledreborg (1737-1786). She was a daughter of Datter af Lensgreve Johan Ludvig von Holstein-Ledreborg, til Ledreborg and Hedevig Christiansdatter Vind. They were the parents of two sons and a daughter. Their elder son Frederik Brockenhuus (1758-1846) settled with his Italian wife in Naples where he served as Danish envoy. The younger son Johan Ludvig Brockenhuus (1759-1830) served as overhofmester. The daughter Vibeke Margrethe Brockenhuus (1764-1836) was married to lord chamberlain and director of the Royal Danish Theatre Adam Wilhelm von Hauch (1755-1838).

Civic offices
Preceded by Christian Ditlev Rantzau (county governor)	County Governor of Vordingborg Amt; 1767–1776	Succeeded by Rudolph Bielke (county governor)
Preceded by Eggert Christopher Knuth (1722-1776)	Diocesan governor of Zealand; 1776–1787	Succeeded by Christian Haxthausen
