= Carsten Hauch =

Danish poet (1790–1872)

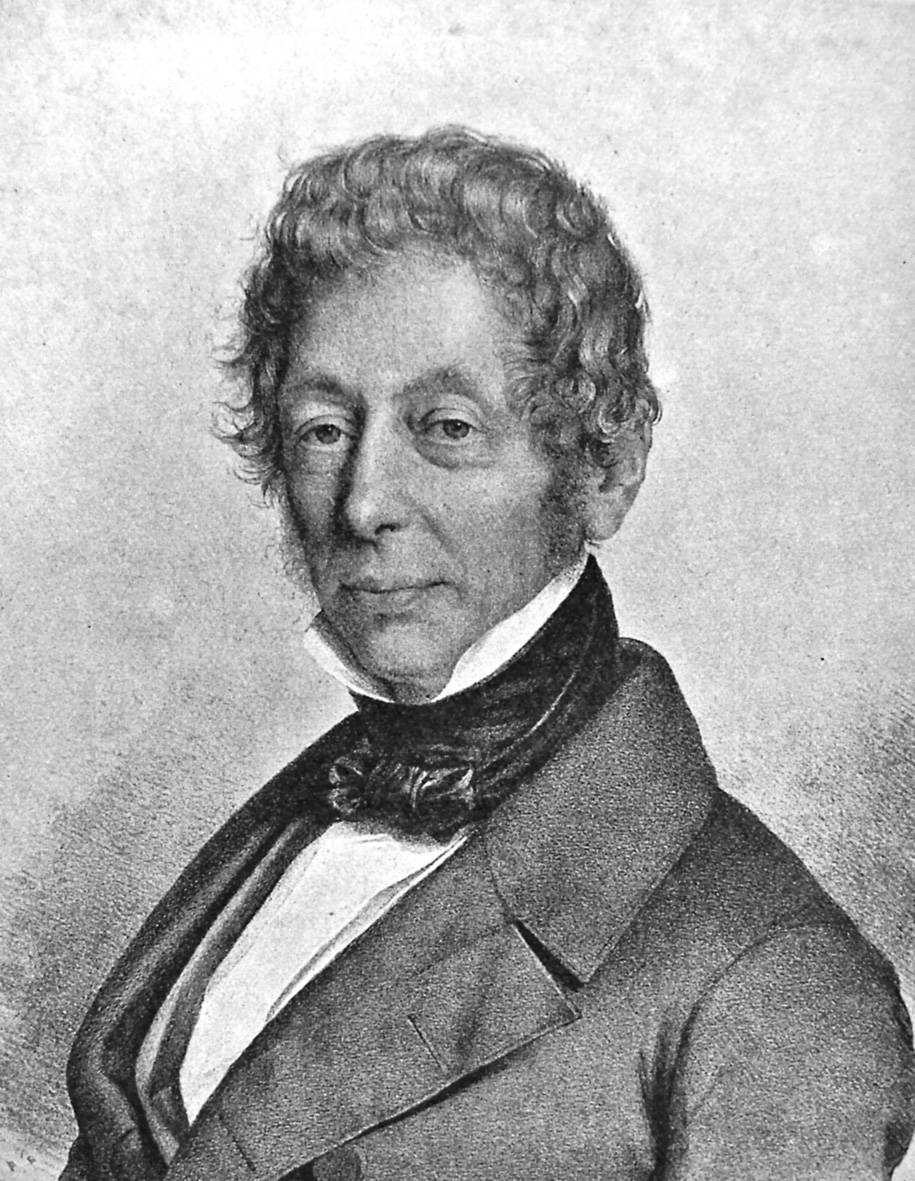
Johannes Carsten Hauch

Johannes Carsten Hauch (12 May 1790 – 4 March 1872) was a Danish poet.

== Biography ==
Hauch was born in Frederikshald in Norway. His father was the Danish bailiff in Smaalenene, Frederik Hauch. His mother, Karen Tank was sister of Norwegian ship merchant and parliament president Carsten Tank. In 1802 Hauch lost his mother, and in 1803 returned with his father to Denmark. In 1807 he fought as a volunteer against the English invasion. He entered the university of Copenhagen in 1808, and in 1821 took his doctors degree. He became the friend and associate of Steffens and Oehlenschläger, warmly adopting the romantic views about poetry and philosophy.

His first two dramatic poems, The Journey to Ginistan and The Power of Fancy, appeared in 1816, and were followed by a lyrical drama, Rosaurn (1817); but these works attracted little or no attention. Hauch therefore gave up all hope of fame as a poet, and resigned himself entirely to the study of science. He took his doctors degree in zoology in 1821, and went abroad to pursue his studies. At Nice he had an accident which obliged him to submit to the amputation of one foot.

He returned to literature, publishing a dramatized fairy tale, the Hamadryad, and the tragedies of Bajazet, Tiberius, Gregory VII, in 1828-1829, The Death of Charles V (1831), and The Siege of Maestricht (1832). These plays were violently attacked and enjoyed no success. Hauch then turned to novel-writing, and published in succession five romances Vilhelm Zabern (1834); The Alchemist (1836); A Polish Family (1839); The isle on the Rhine (1845); and Robert Fulton (1853).

In 1842 he collected his shorter Poems. In 1846 he was appointed professor of Scandinavian languages in Kiel, but returned to Copenhagen when war broke out in 1848. About this time his dramatic talent was at its height, and he produced one admirable tragedy after another; among these may be mentioned Svend Grathe (1841); The Sisters at Kinnekullen (1849); Marshal Sag (1850); Honour Lost and Won (1851) and Tycho Brahe's Youth (1852). From 1858 to 1860 Hauch was director of the Danish National Theatre; he produced three more tragedies: The King's Favourite (1859); Henry of Navarre (1863); and Julian the Apostate (1866). In 1861 he published another collection of Lyrical Poems and Romances and in 1862 the historical epic of Valdemar Seir.

From 1851, when he succeeded Oehlenschläger, to his death, he held the honorary post of professor of aesthetics at the university of Copenhagen. He died in Rome in 1872, and was buried at the Cimitero acattolico.

Hauch was one of the most prolific of the Danish poets. His lyrics and romances in verse are always line in form and often strongly imaginative. In all his writings, but especially in his tragedies, he displays a strong bias in favor of what is mystical and supernatural. Of his dramas Marshal Stig is perhaps the best, and of his novels the patriotic tale of Vilhelm Zabern is admired the most.

Hauch's novels were collected (1873–1874) and his dramatic works (3 volumes, 2nd edition, 1852–1859).
