= Ove Skade =

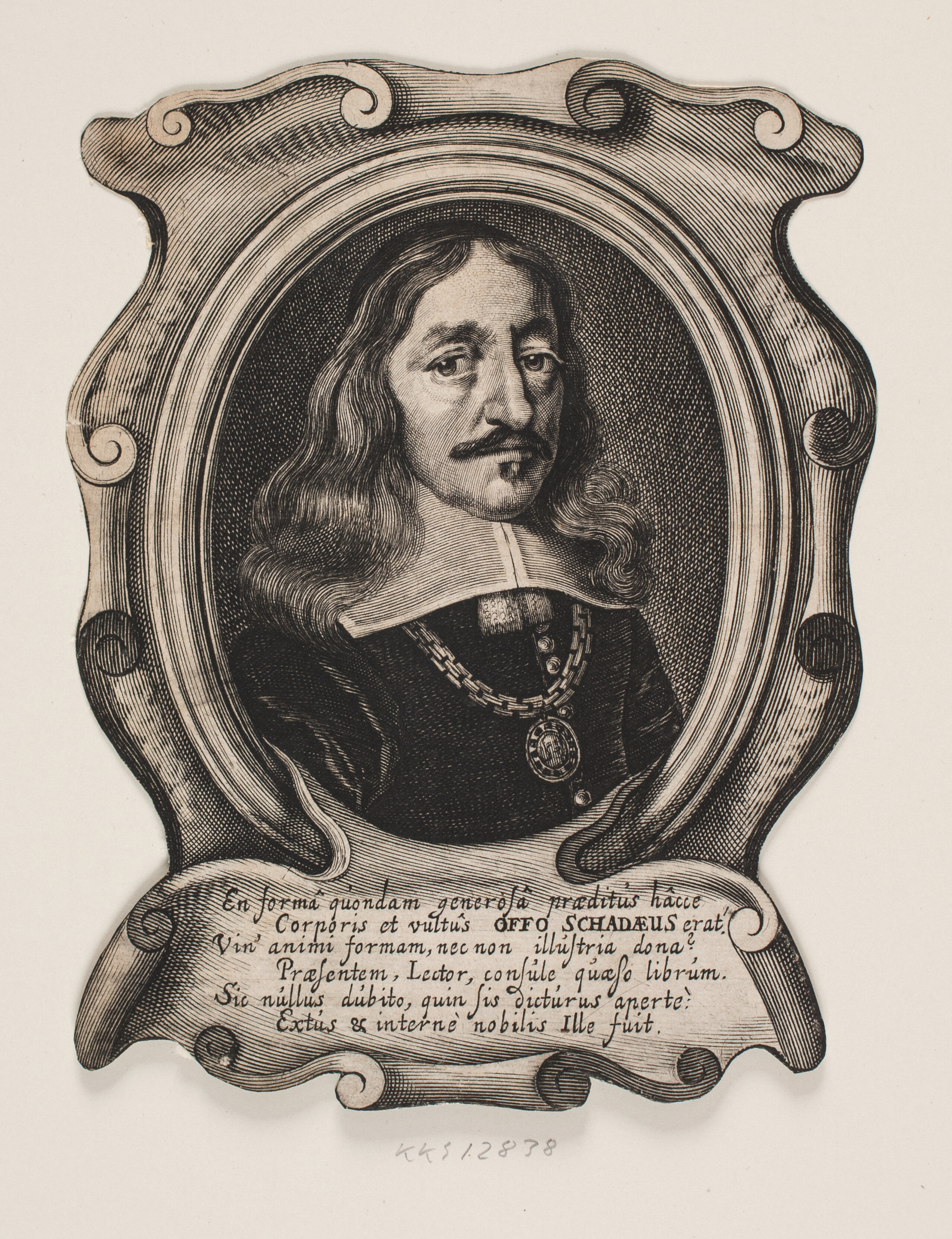
Ove Skade by Albert Haelweghm 1666.

Ove (Offe) Skade (23 August 1609 – 19 October 1664) was a Danish courtier and fiefholder who served as the first Prefect of the Diocese of Zealand.

== Early life ==
Skade was born on 23 August 1609 at Kattrup He was the son of the estate's owner Christoffer Skade and his wife Bodil née Brun..

== Career ==
In 1615, Skade became a Page for Duke Ulrik whom he later accompanied on journeys abroad. In 1629–31, he served as secretary in Danske Kancelli. In 1631, he was sent to Russia with Malte Juul. In 1633, he was appointed hofjunker and sent to Dresden. In 1635, he was appointed kammerjun ker for Duke Frederik.

In 1660, Skade was granted the fief of Roskilde. In the same year, he was appointed the first Prefect of the Diocese of Zealand. He was also created a prive councillor (rigsråd), assessor in Danske Kanvelli and a Supreme Court justice. He was fiefholder of Roskilde County (Roskilde Amt) until 16 November 1661. In 1662, he was succeeded by Kürbitz.

== Personal life ==
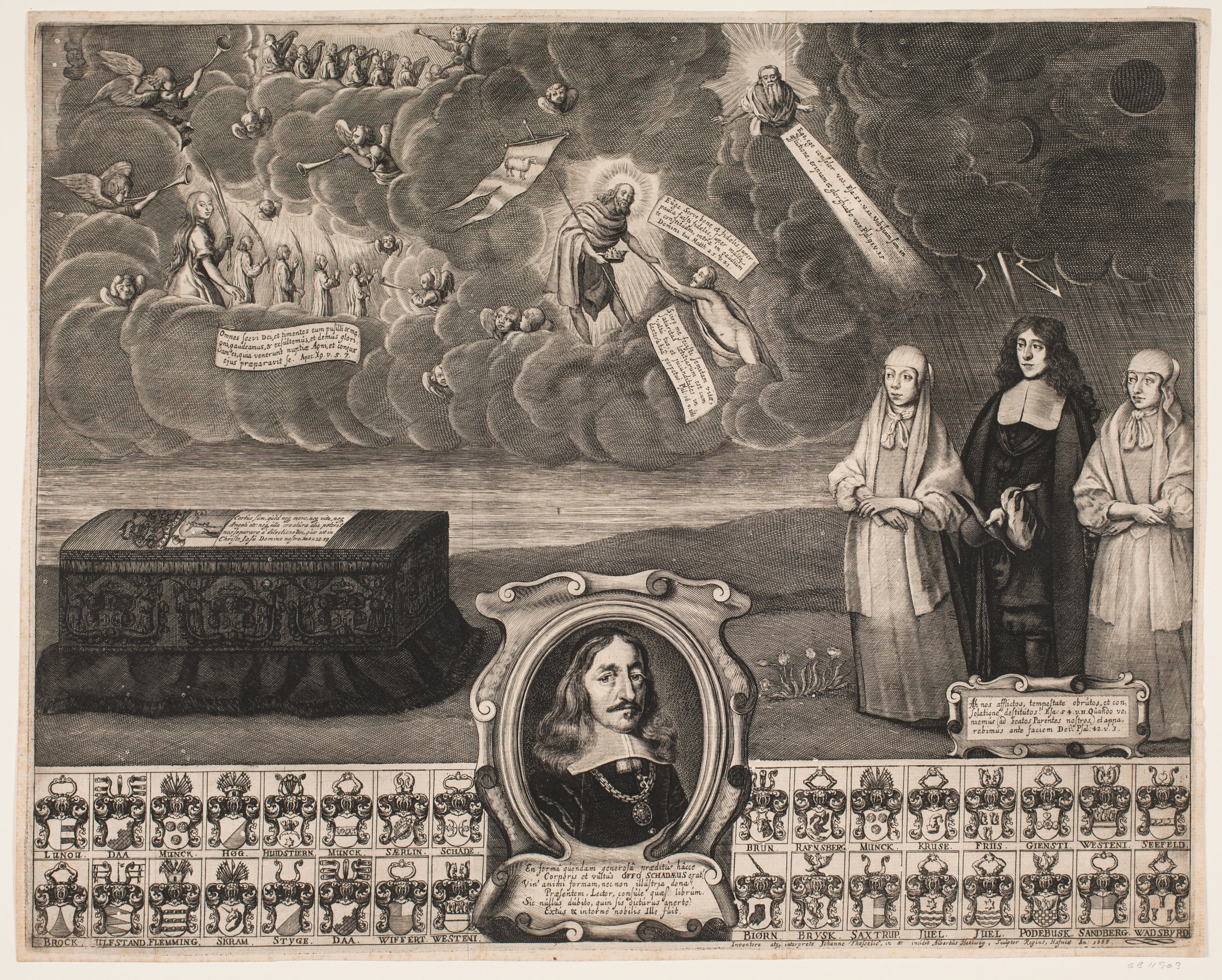
En forma quondam ... Offo Schadæus ....

On 19 November 1637, Skade was married to Augusta Margrethe von Marschalck (1609–54). She was a daughter of chancellor Levin v. Marschalck and wife Judith, née Marschalck.

He died on 19 October 1664.

Civic offices
| Preceded by None | Duocesal governor of Zealand; 1660–1661 | Succeeded by Johan Christopher Körbitz |
