= Hünern =

Hünern may refer to the former German name of the following villages in Poland:

- Psary, Oława County
- Psary, Trzebnica County
