= Frederik von Lowzow =

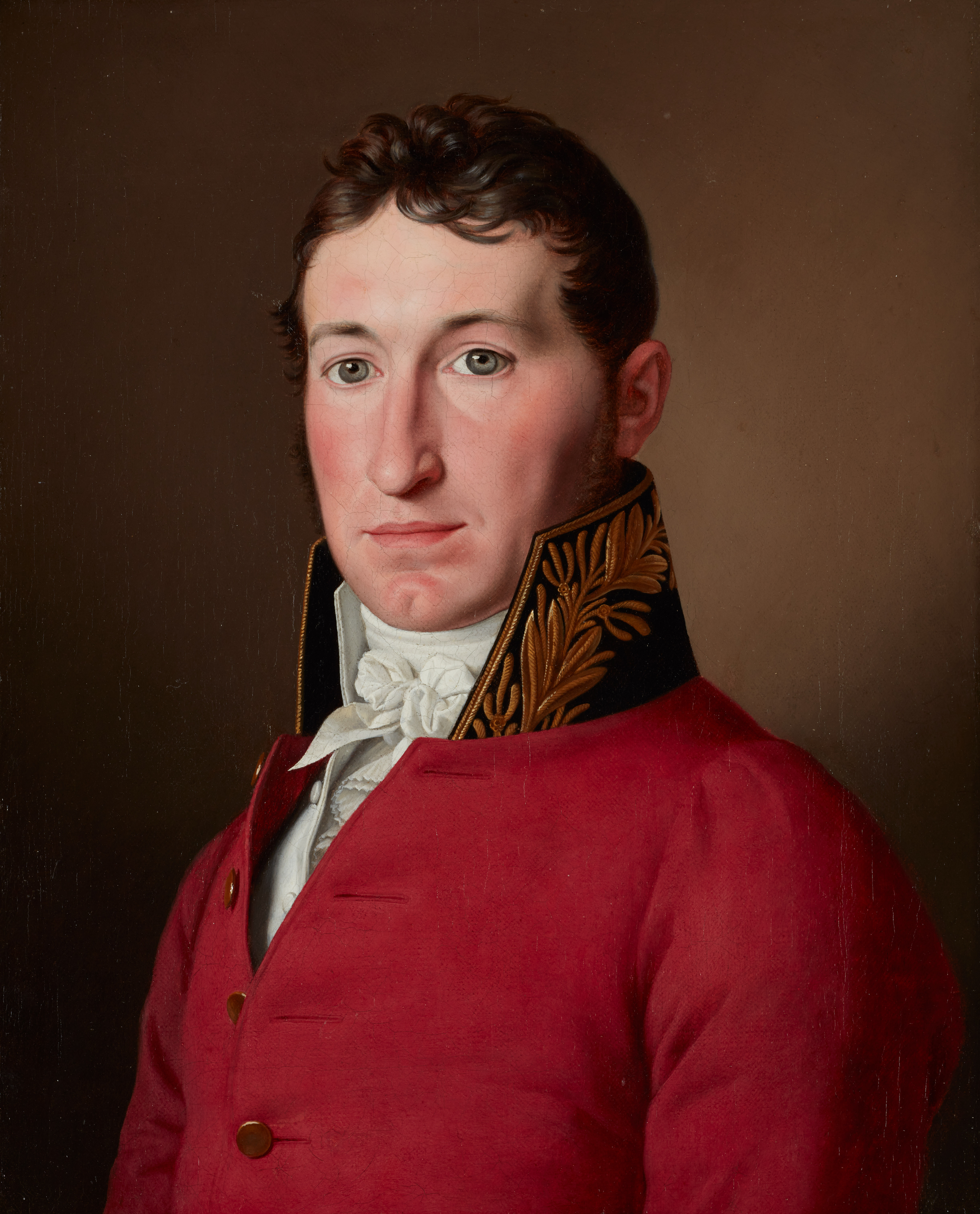
- Portrait of Frederik von Lowzow by Christoffer Wilhelm Eckersberg, 1817.

Diocesan Governor of Zealand
- In office 1821–1831
- Monarch: Frederick VI
- Preceded by: Christopher Schøller Bülow
- Succeeded by: Julius Knuth
- Constituency: Diocese of Zealand

Personal details
- Born: 27 August 1788 Copenhagen, Denmark
- Died: 7 August 1869 (aged 80) Copenhagen, Denmark
- Occupation: Diocesan governor

Fredrik von Lowzow (27 August 1788 – 7 August 1869) was a Danish civil servant and judge. He served as diocesan governor (stiftsamtmand) of Zealand from 1821 to 1831 and President of the Supreme Court of Denmark from 1843 to 1856.

== Early life and education ==
Lowzow was born on 27 August 1788 in Copenhagen, the son of Geheimekonferensraad Adam Gottlieb von Lowzow and Dorothea Sofie Krog. He matriculated from Christiani Institut in 1805 and earned a law degree from the University of Copenhagen in 1809.

== Career ==
After his graduation, Lowzow was appointed as hofjunker. On 21 March 1811, he was appointed amtmann of Larvig County in Norway. He was the same year awarded the title of kammerjunker. In 1815, he left Norway as the result of the dissolution of the Union between Denmark and Norway. On 20 June 1815, he was appointed a Supreme Court justice.

On 28 October 1817, he was awarded the title of chamberlain (kammerherre). On 2 October 1819, he was made a member of Kommissionen til Undersøgelse af Kommuneafgifter. On 26 November 1818, he was appointed acting diocesan governor of Zealand. On 24 March 1821, he was appointed as permanent diocesan governor of Zealand and Copenhagen County. On 2 March 1831, he was appointed director of Generaltoldkammeret og Kommercekollcgict. In 1843, Lowzow was appointed as President (Chief Justice) of the Supreme Court. He retired in 1856.

== Personal life ==
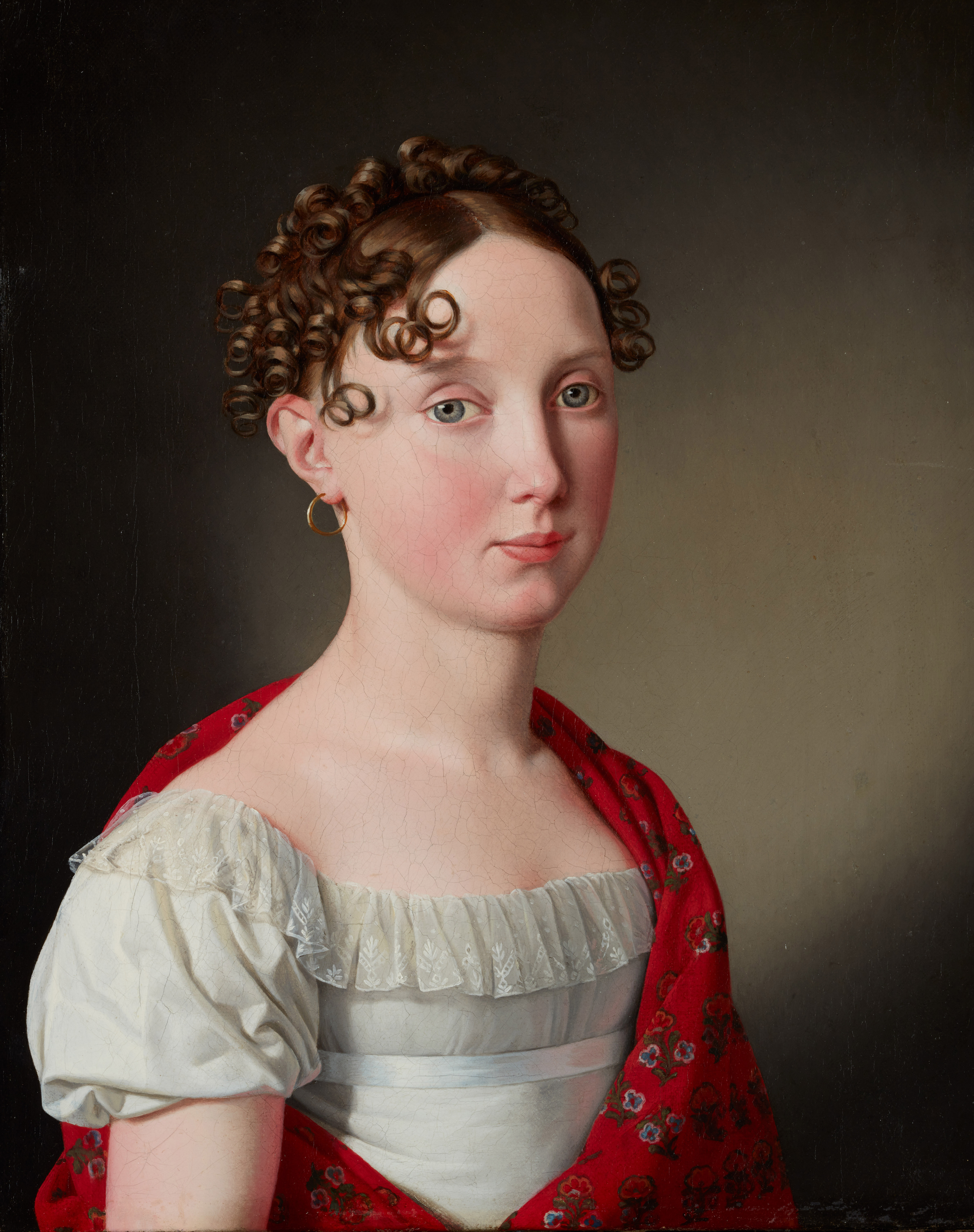
Elisabeth Ida Mariane Brockenhuus, by Eckersberg

Lowzow was married three times. His first wife was Juliane Marie Bech (1788–1813), daughter of mayor Peder Bech and Susanne Theodora Gottlieb. The wedding was held on 14 May 1813 but she died less than three months later. In June 1817, Lowzow was married to Elisabeth Mariane Brockenhuus (1797–1827). She was the daughter of Overhofmester Johan Ludvig Brockenhuus and Anna Ernestine Schack. She gave birth to four children, of whom three survived to adulthood:

- Antoinette Siegfriede von Æpwzpw (1818–1893), married Wilhelm Carl Eppingen von Sponneck
- Louise Juliane von Lowzow (1820–1882), married to chamberlain Frederik Rudoph Edwin Marie friherre Dirckinck-Holmfeld
- Adam Gottlob von Lowzow (1825–1903), owner of Slettegaard

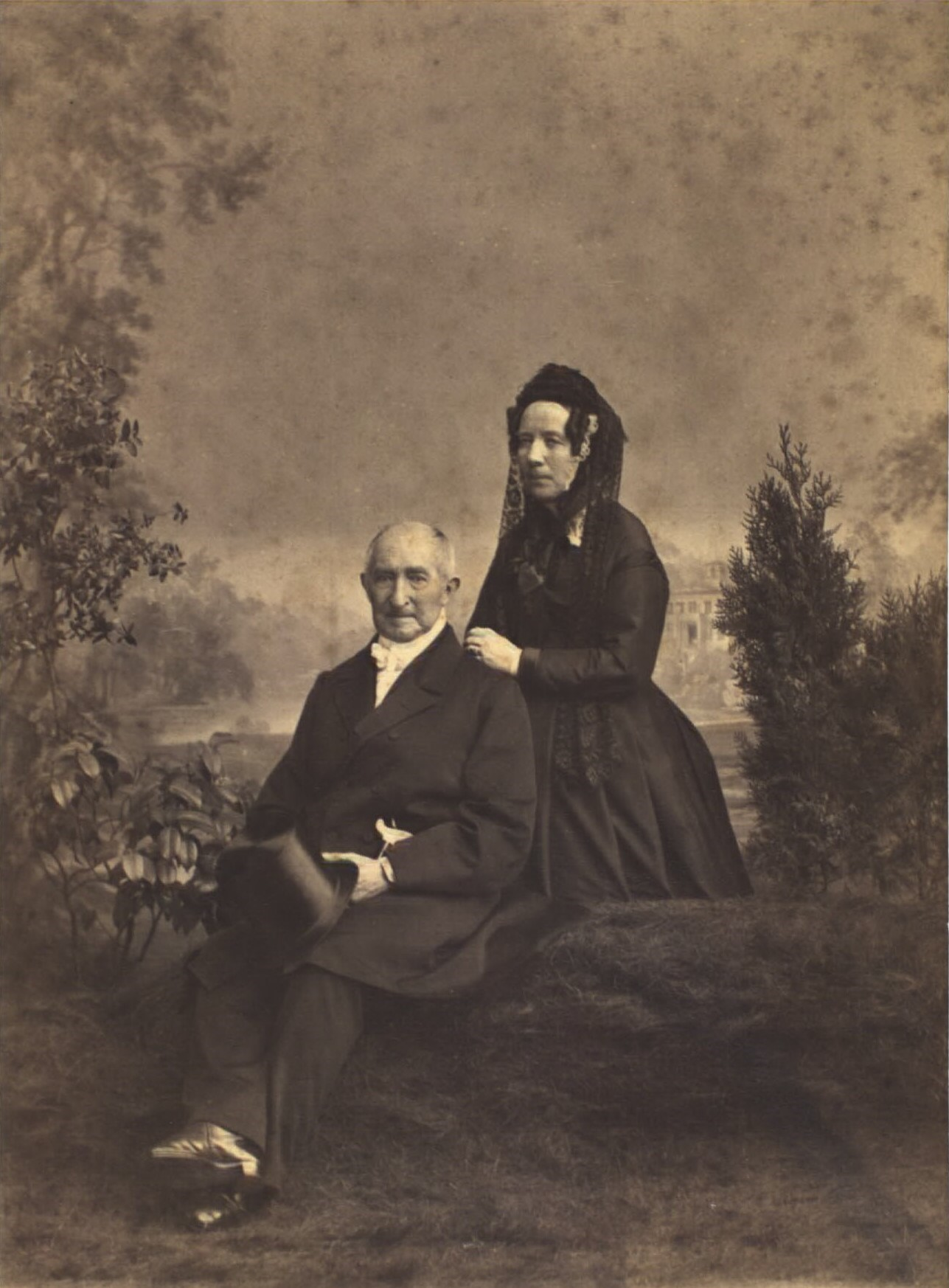
Frederik von Lowzow and his third wife Sophie, photographed by Georg Emil Hansen

On 5 December 1829, Lowzow married thirdly Charlotte Sophie Blücher (1804–1894), the daughter of chief of the Royal Horse Guards Frederik v. Blücherand and Helene de Thygesen. She gave birth to the following children:

- Helene Sophie Caroline Frederikke von Lowzow (1832–1917), married to Knud Bille Brockenhuus-Schack til Giesegaard
- Fanny Manon Georgine von Lowzow (1837–1870), married to Niels Basse Fønss til Hindsgavl
- Bertha Emilie Mathilde Barner (1839–1876), married to Hans Sophus Vilhelm von Barner til Eskildstrup

Lowzow was made an honorary member of Roskilde Shooting Society in 1827. He died on 7 August 1869.

== Awards ==
Lowzow was created a Knight Commander of the Order of the Dannebrog in 1828. He was awarded the Grand Cross in 1836. In 1845, he was awarded the title of Geheimekonferensraad.

Civic offices
Preceded by Christopher Schøller Bülow	Diocesan governor of Zealand; 1821–1831	Succeeded by Julius Knuth
Preceded by Christopher Schøller Bülow	County Governor of Copenhagen County; 1821–1831	Succeeded by Julius Knuth

Legal offices
Preceded by Anker Vilhelm Frederik Bornemann	Chief Justice of the Supreme Court of Denmark; 1843–1856	Succeeded by Johannes Ephraim Larsen
