= Julius Knuth =

Danish landowner and county governor (1787–1852)

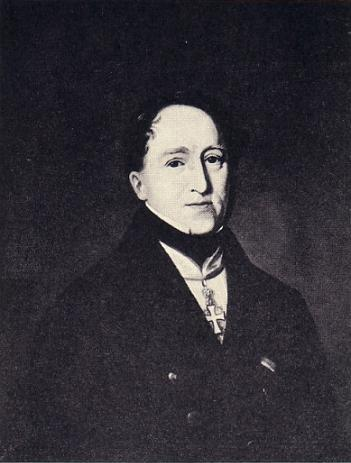
Julius Knuth

Frederik Christian Julius greve Knuth (12 July 1787 – 30 October 1852) was a Danish landowner and county governor. He was the brother of Eggert Christopher Knuth and father of Adam Knuth.

== Early life and education ==
Knuth was the son of Frederik Knuth. He completed his secondary schooling in 1804 and earned a law degree from the University of Copenhagen in 1809.

== Career ==
Knuth spent a year as a volunteer in Danske Kancelli before being employed there as an assistant (auskultant). In 1811, he was employed (deputeret) in Det vestindisk-Guineiske Rente- og Generaltoldkammer.

In 1815, Knut was appointed county governor (amtmand) of Holbæk County. In 1831, he was appointed prefect (stiftsamtmand) of the Diocese of Zealand (including Bornholm and the Faroe Islands and county governor of Copenhagen County. In 1845, he was released from the latter office. In 1851, he was dismissed as diocesan civil servant after it had been decided to abolish the office as an independent office.

He had inherited Bonderup in 1816. From 1804 until his death in 1852, he served as curator of Vemmelev.

== Personal life ==
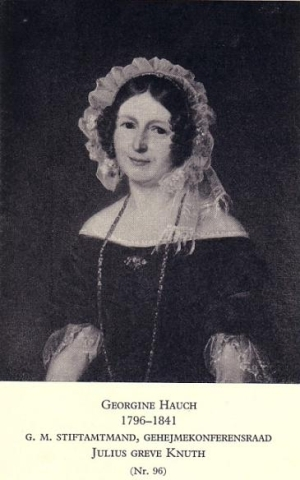
Georgine Frederikke Vilhelmine von Hauch

On 2 August 1811, Knuth was married to Ulrica Christiane Haxthausen (1787–1819). She was a daughter of general-lieutenant Frederik Gottschalck Haxthausen Jr. The marriage ended when Ulrica died.

On 7 December 1822, he was married to Frederikke Vilhelmine Hauch (1796–1841). She was a daughter of county governor Johan Carsten Hauch and Pauline née Rye; She gave birth to the following children:

- Johan Sigismund Ditlev Knuth-Knuthenborg (1923–1885)
- Juliane Pauline Sophie Knuth (1826–1911)
- Adam Vilhelm Frederik von Knuth-Knuthenborg (1829–1902)
- Charlotte Frederikke Knuth (1830–1882)
- Frederik Christian Julius Knuth-Knuthenborg
- Charlotte Frederikke Knuth (1830–1883),

On 4 August 1846, he was married to Cathrine Frederikke Haxthausen (1800–1877), a sister of his first wife. Knuth and his second wife's city home was at Rådhusstræde 46 (Smarem's Quarter, now Rådhusstræde 1) in 1840.

== Awards ==
In 1810, Knuth was awarded the title of kammerjunker. In 1813, he became chamberlain (kammerherre). In 1836, he was created a Knight Commander of the Order of Dannebrog. In 1840, he was awarded the Grand Cross. In 1948, he was appointed gehejmekonferensråd.

Civic offices
Preceded by Herman Løvenskiold	County Governor of Holbæk County; 1715–1731	Succeeded by Mathias Vilhelm Moltke
Preceded by Frederik von Lowzow	Prefect of Nordre Zealand; 1831–1850	Succeeded by None
Preceded by Frederik von Lowzow	County Governor of Copenhagen County; 1831–1850	Succeeded by None
