= Christopher Schøller Bülow =

Danish landowner (1770–1830)

Christopher Schøller Bülow (11 November 1770 - 11 August 1830) was a Danish landowner who served as diocesan governor (stiftsamtmand) of Diocese of Zealand and county governor of Copenhagen County. He went bankrupt in 1818 and fled the country after being convicted of embezzlement. He died in Hamburg.

== Early life and education ==
Bülow was born on 11 November 1770 in Copenhagen to chamberlain Hans Løvenhjelm Bülow til Thestrupgaard (1737-1803) and Isabelle née Schøller (died 1822). He completed his secondary schooling in 1787, was appointed kammerjunker for the crown prince in 1790 and earned a law degree from the University of Copenhagen in 1792.

== Career ==
In 1794, Bülow was employed as an assistant (auscultant) in the Rentekammeret. In 1799, he was appointed chamberlain (kammerherre). In 1801, he was employed as assessor in Danske Kancelli. In 1802, he became a council member (delegeret) in Danske Kancelli.

In 1798, Bülow bought Tybjerggaard at Næstved (sold 1804). In 1800, he bought Gyldenholm at Slagelse (sold 1810). By inheritance he had also become the owner of Veden Manor in Norway. In 1806 he bought the estates Nordfelt and Ålebæk on Møn. In 1816, he was appointed Prefect of Zealand and county governor (amtmand) of Copenhagen County. In 1817, he was awarded the title of gehejmekonferensråd.

== Bankruptcy and death ==
In 1818, Bülow was suspended from his public duties after entering bankruptcy proceedings. Frederik von Lowzow was appointed acting prefect of Zealand and county governor of Copenhagen in his absence. In 1820 he was prosecuted for embezzlement with public funds. In 1821 he was sentenced to prison until he repaid the defrauded sums and deprived of rank and noble rights. He fled before imprisonment to Hamburg, where he died in 1830.

== Personal life ==
Bülow was married twice. His first wife was Anne Margrethe, Baroness Bolten (1778-1804), daughter of baron Henrik Bolten and Anna Nørregaard. They had the daughter Isabella Annette Annette von von Bülow (1796-1873). She was married twice, first to Caspar Hermann Wedel-Heinen til Hollufgaard og Fraugdegaard (1787-1834) and secondly to baron Ove Christian Ludvig Emerentius Gyldenkrone (1795-1863).

In 1806, Bülow married lady-in-waiting Emilie Augusta Marie, Baroness Güldencrone. She was a daughter of baron Christian Frederik Güldencrone and Marie Salome née von Gambs.

Civic offices
Preceded by Werner Jasper Andreas Moltke	Prefect of the Diocese of Zealand; 1816–1821	Succeeded by Frederik von Lowzow
Preceded by Werner Jasper Andreas Moltke	County Governor of Copenhagen County; 1816–1821	Succeeded by Frederik von Lowzow
