= Eggert Christopher Knuth =

Danish landowner, judge, and administrator (1722–1776)

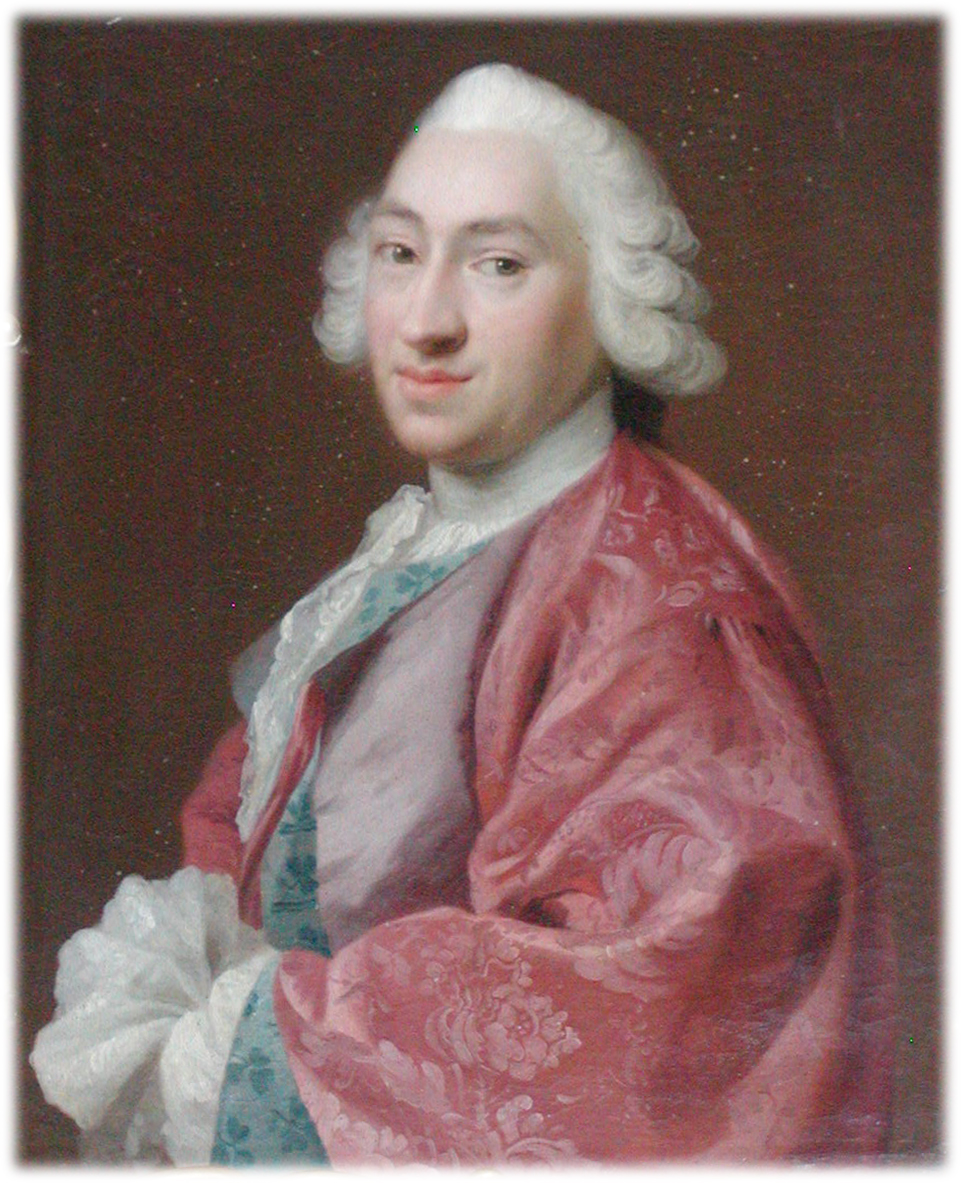
- Knuth painted by Hans Arbien.

Diocesan Governor of Zealand
- In office 1764–17776
- Monarchs: Frederick V, Christian VII
- Preceded by: Holger Skeel
- Succeeded by: Henrik Brockenhuus
- Constituency: Diocese of Zealand

Personal details
- Born: 20 October 1724 Denmark
- Died: 17 December 1748 (aged 24) Denmark
- Occupation: Supreme Court justice, diocesan governor and privy councillor

Eggert Christopher (von) Knuth, Count of Knuthenborg and Gyldensteen (20 October 1722 – 26 February 1776), was a Danish landowner, Supreme Court justice and diocesan governor of the Diocese of Zealand. He was the brother of Christian Frederik and Conrad Ditlev Knuth and the father of Johan Henrik Knuth and Frederik Knuth.

== Early life and education ==
Knuth was the son of Adam Christopher Knuth (1687–1738) and Ida Margrethe Reventlow (1701–1757). He studied in Göttingen in 1739.

== Career ==
On his return to Denmark he enrolled in the army where he became a captain in 1742. In 1732, he joined the Life Guard on Foot. In 1749 he became adjutant-general to the king. In 1751 he resigned from the army (with the rank of colonel) to become a Supreme Court justice. In 1759, he was appointed as geheimeråd. In 1764 he was appointed diocesan governor of the Diocese of Zealand. In 1772, he was appointed as one of the judges in the trial against Queen Caroline Mathilde.

== Property and titles ==
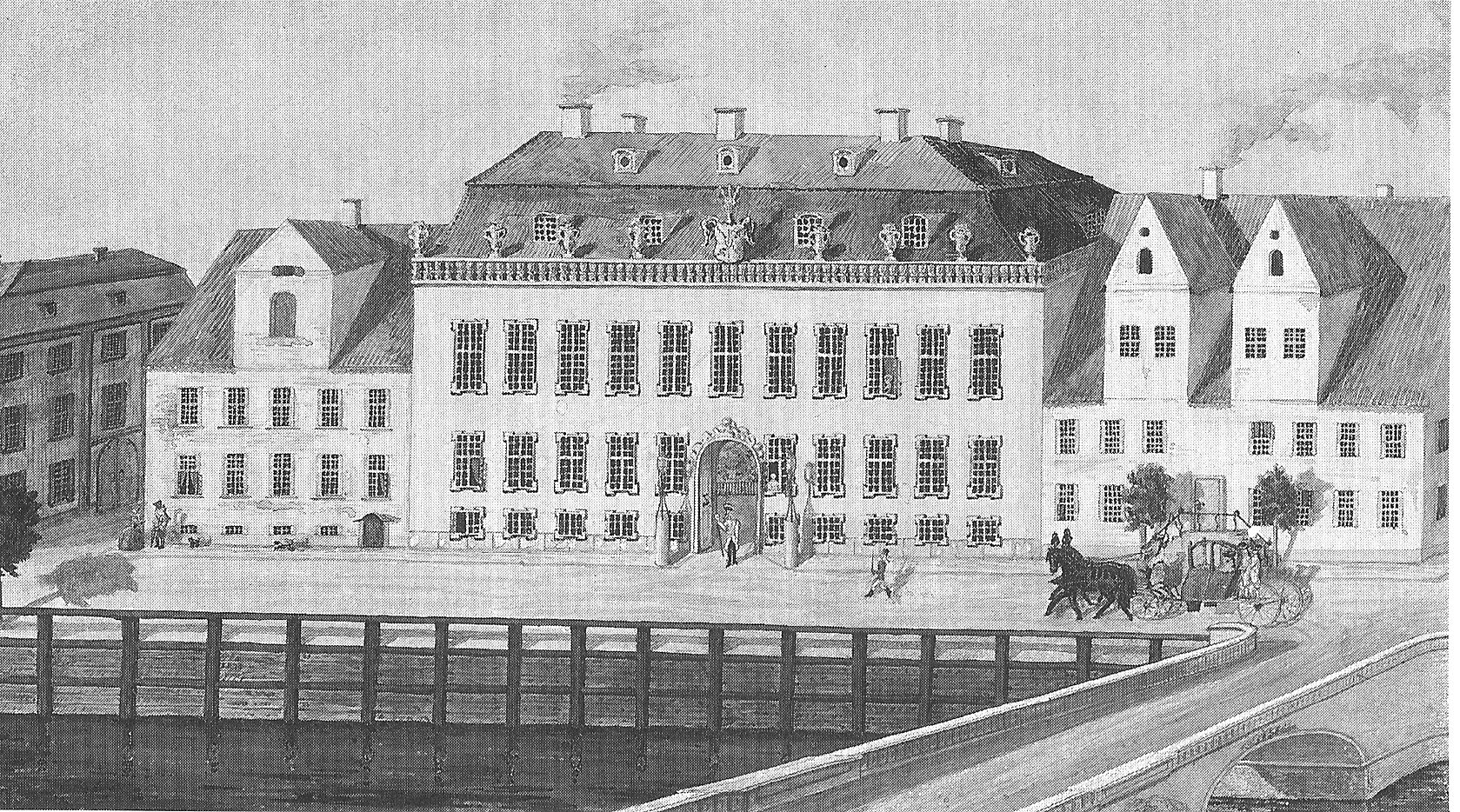
Knuth's mansion at Frederiksholms Kanal in Copenhagen

Eggert Christopher Knuth succeeded his father to the County of Knuthenborg in 1747. Through his first wife he also acquired the County of Gyldensteen on Funen. In 1760 he acquired Ravnstrup at Næstved only to sell it again eight years later. In 1772, he acquired Mørup and converted it into a stamhus (sold in 1803).

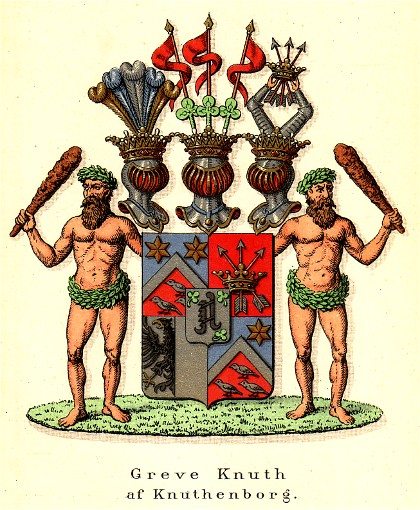
Coat of arms

In 1759, Knuth purchased the Plessen Mansion at Frederiksholms Kanal as his city home in Copenhagen. It was from then on known as "Det Knuthske Hotel" (The Knuth Hotel).

In 1742 Knuth was awarded the title of chamberlain (kammerherre). In 1754 Knuth was created a Knight of the Order of the Dannebrog. In 1763, he was awarded the Ordre de l'Union Parfaite. In 1766, he was awarded the title of gehejmekonferensråd In 1773, he was awarded the Order of the Elephant.

== Personal life ==
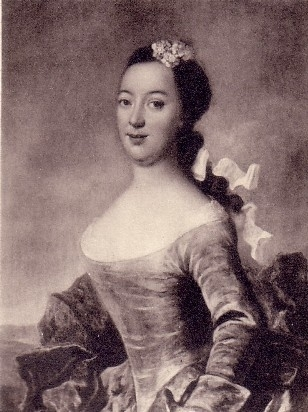
Knuth's second wife Marie von Numsen.

Knuth was married three times. His first wife was Marguerithe Maurice Francoise Isidore Isidore Casado de Monteleone (1723–1752), daughter of Joachim Christoph Moltke, diplomat and ambassador, and Sophia Albertine baroness Wolzogen. The wedding took place on 5 February 1742 in Gunseby Church. Her maternal grandfather was Jean Henri Huguetan Gyldensteen. They had two daughters and a son:

- Christiane Sophie Frederikke Knuth (1743–1790)
- Charlotte Louise Knuth (1745-1812), married to Carl Friedrich von Görtz (1733-1797)
- Johan Henrik Knuth (1746-1802)

Knuth's second wife was Marie Numsen (173-1765), daughter of Michael Mathiasen von Numsen and Anna Sophie Margarethe Marie Thomasine von Ingenhaeff. The wedding took place on 20 October 1752. They had one daughter and one son:

- Frederikke Juliane Marie Knuth (1755–1804), married to Michael Herman Løvenskiold (1751-1807)
- Frederik Greve Knuth (1760-1818)

On 9 September 1765, Knuth married Eleonore Louise Caroline Moltke (1725-1785). She was a niece of Adam Gottlob Moltke.

He died on 26 February 1776. He is buried in Hunseby Church.

Civic offices
Preceded by Holger Skeel	Prefect of Zealand; 1764–1776	Succeeded by Henrik Adam Brockenhuus
