= Frederik Hauch =

Danish government official

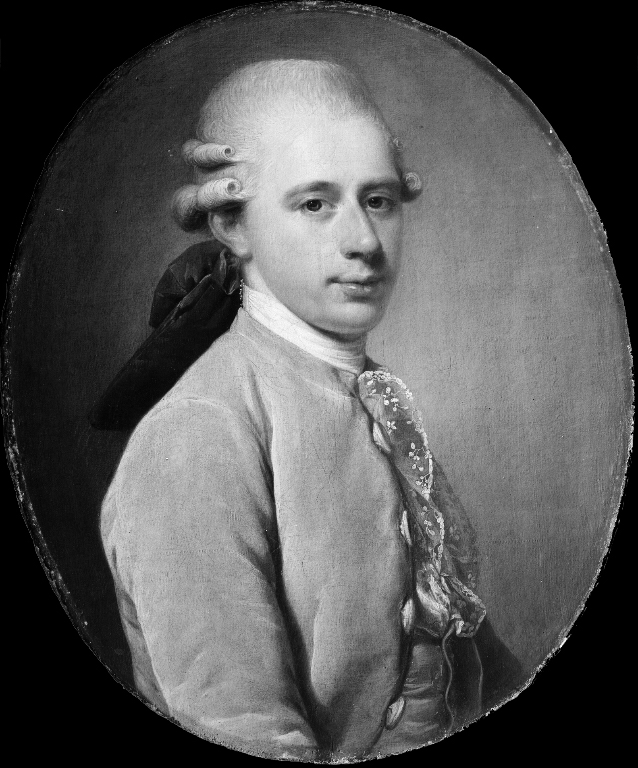
- Hauch painted by Jens Juel.

Diocesan Governor of Zealand
- In office 1802–1819
- Monarchs: Christian VII, Frederick VI
- Preceded by: Johan Henrik Knuth
- Succeeded by: Werner Jasper Andreas Moltke
- Constituency: Diocese of Zealand

Personal details
- Born: 25 August 1754 Copenhagen, Denmark
- Died: 28 October 1839 (aged 85) Copenhagen, Denmark
- Occupation: Diocesan governor

Frederik Hauch (25 August 1754 – 27 October 1839) was a Danish government official who served as postmaster general and county governor. He was the brother of lord chamberlain Adam Wilhelm Hauch and father of author and professor Carsten Hauch.

== Early life and education ==
Hauch was born on 23 August 1754 in Copenhagen to general in the Royal Danish Army Andreas Hauch and Sophie née Styrup. His father was ennobled in 1750.

Hauch started his career as a page (from 1766) and kammerpage (from 1770) for Christian VII with permission to simultaneously attend classes at Sorø Academy. In 1771, he was removed from court by Struense with 400 Danish rigsdaler in temporary salary (ventepenge). The reason for this was that, according to Struensee, Hauch's appointment at court was part of an intrigue that lord chamberlain Conrad Holck had arranged to displace the king's favorite, Fritz von Warnstedt. In 1773, Hauch left Sorø and in the same year passed a Danish law exam (as opposed to the more prestigious one in Latin) at the University of Kiel. He then traveled abroad and continued his studies, first for two years at the University of Göttingen and then for a year at the academy in Angers.

== Career ==
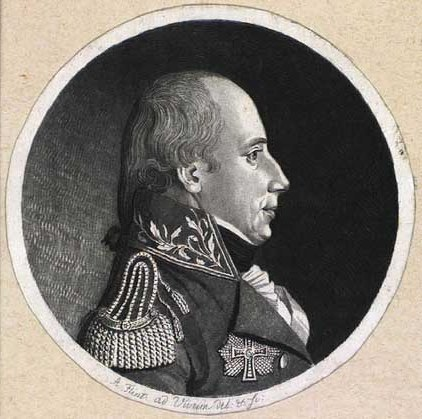
Frederik Hauch by Andreas Flint

After his return in 1777, he became an auscultant in the Supreme Court, despite the fact that he had not submitted to the legal official exam "in Latin". In 1779, he became chamberlain. In 1781, he was appointed county governor of Smålenenes County in Norway. In 1789, he was appointed prefect of the Diocese of Bergen and county governor of Søndre Bergenhus County. In 1802, he returned to Denmark to serve as prefect of the Diocese of Zealand and the Faroe Islands as well as county governor of Copenhagen County and the Faroe Islands. The following year, on 22 May, he became a Knight of Dannebrog and extraordinary judge in the Supreme Court. In 1810, according to a royal decree, he was appointed postmaster general and also in the same year a member of the Postkassepensionsdirektionen. He retired from the end of the year 1833.

== Personal life ==
Hauch married to Karen Tank (1764–1802), daughter of Niels Tank of Rød Manor and Sophia Catharina Tank.

Hauch died on 27 October 1839 in the Stable Master's House in Copenhagen. He was survived by a daughter and two sons. One of his sons was the author and professor Carsten Hauch.

== Awards ==
In 1811, Hauch was awarded the title of gehejmekonferensråd. On 22 May 1823, Hauch was created a Knight of the Order of the Dannebrog. On 25 May 1836, he was awarded the Order of the Danneborg's Cross of Honour.

Civic offices
Preceded by Christian de Schouboe	County Governor of Bergen County; 1798–1802	Succeeded by Johan Randulf Bull
Preceded by Johan Henrik Knuth	Diocesan governor of Zealand; 1802–1810	Succeeded by Werner Jasper Andreas Moltke
Preceded by Johan Henrik Knuth	County Governor of Copenhagen County; 1802–1810	Succeeded by Werner Jasper Andreas Moltke
Preceded by Johan Henrik Knuth	County Governor of the Faroe Islands; 1802–1810	Succeeded by Werner Jasper Andreas Moltke
