= Werner Jasper Andreas Moltke =

German-Danish county governor of Lord President of Copenhagen

Werner Jasper Moltke
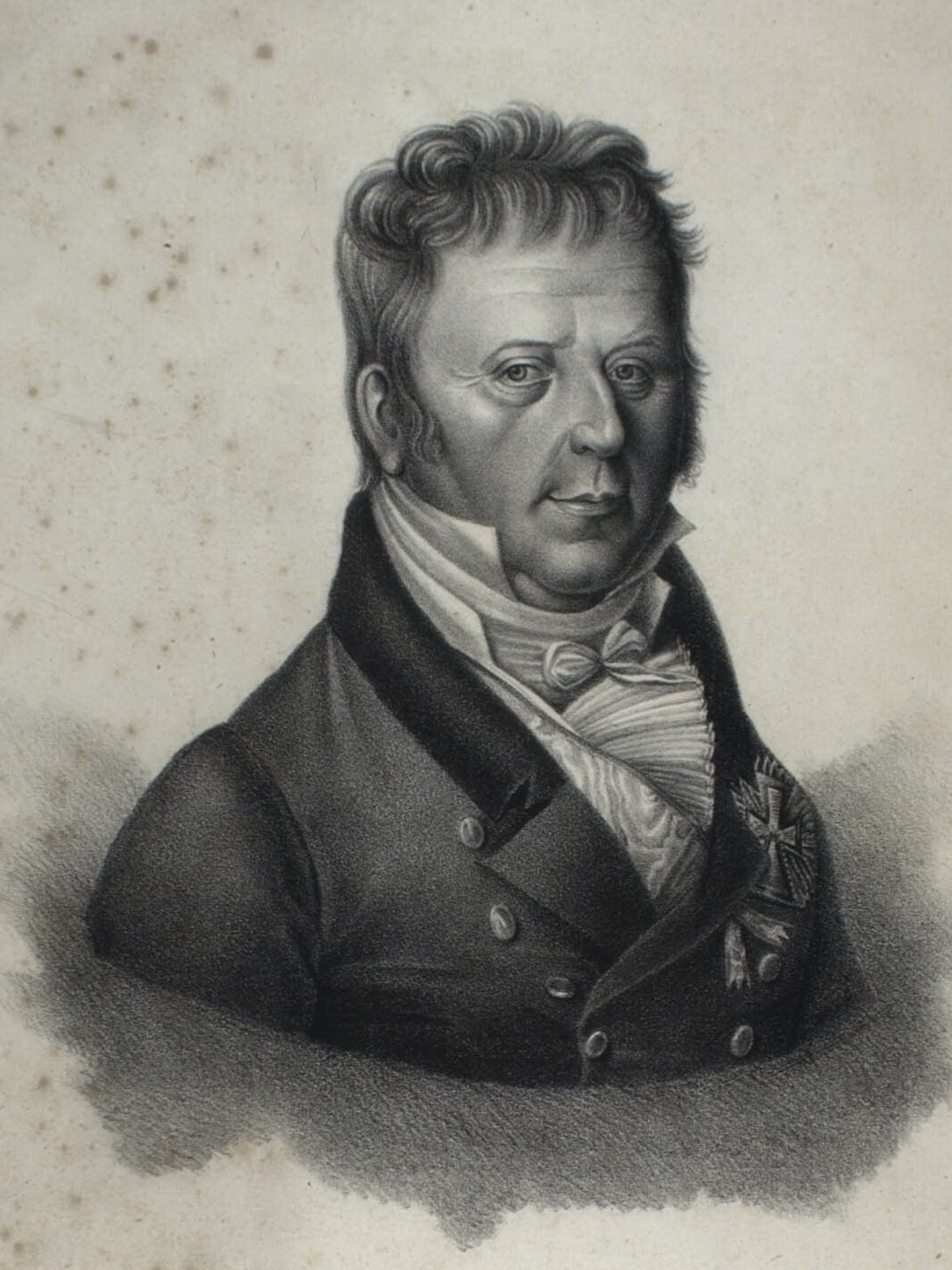

Lord President of Copenhagen
- In office 1816–1834
- Monarchs: Christian VII, Frederick VI
- Preceded by: Frederik Hauch
- Succeeded by: Christopher Schøller Bülow

Personal details
- Born: 15 September 1755 Gut Walkendorf, Mecklenburg
- Died: 15 August 1835 (aged 79) Køge, Denmark

Werner Jasper Andreas Moltke (15 September 1755 - 15 August 1835) was a Danish government official who served as county governor, diocesan governor of Ribe and Zealand and Lord President of Copenhagen.

== Early life and court service ==
Moltke was born on 15 September 1755 at Gut Walkendorf, Mecklenburg, the son of Eberhard Friderich Ehrenreich Moltke and Marie Dorthea von Oertzen. In 1876, he became a court page at the Danish court. In 1772, he briefly worked at Rentekammeret. In 1774, he became an infantry lieutenant. After that, he returned to court service as kammerjunker to Princess Charlotte Amalie, who died in 1782.

== Career ==
In 1787, Moltke was appointed county governor of Roskilde Amt. In 1790–1796, he served as president of the local Roskilde Shooting Society. On his departure from the city, he was created an honorary member of the society.

In 1796, he was appointed diocesan governor of Ribe Stiftsamt and county governor of Riberhus. From 12 November 1810 to 22 May 1816, he served as diocesan governor of Zealand and county governor of Copenhagen, Roskilde and the Faroe Islands.

From 1816 to 1834, he served as Lord President of Copenhagen. On 26 January 1813, he was awarded the title of geheimekonferensråd. In 1834, he became a lensgreve. In his capacity of Lord Mayor, he also served as director of Fødselsstiftelsen, member of the Public School Board (Direktoratet for Voger- og Almueskoler), 1st Member of the Commission for Eater Supply, Cobbling and Provisions.

== Personal life ==
In 1783, Moltke married Ida Elisabeth Lütken (1763—1797). She was a daughter of commander captain Christoffer Lütken and Hustru Charlotte Cathrine Weyse. During this marriage, he had a son, Ehrenreich Christoffer Ludvig Moltke (1790—1864). On 27 June 1798, he married Johanne Caspare Rosenørn (1767—1829). She was a daughter of overskænk Rosenørn and Ulrikke Hedevig von Heinen.

He died on 15 August 1828 in Copenhagen.

== Recognition ==
In 1775, Moltke was naturalized as Danish nobility. In 1782, he was awarded the title of chamberlain (kammerherre). In 1803, he was awarded the Grand Cross of the Order of the Dannebrog. In 1831, he was awarded the title of gehejmekonferensråd. In 1834, he was created a lensgreve.

In 1802, citizens of Ribe erected a memorial in his Moltke's honour. It was moved in 1840, 1939 and 2011.

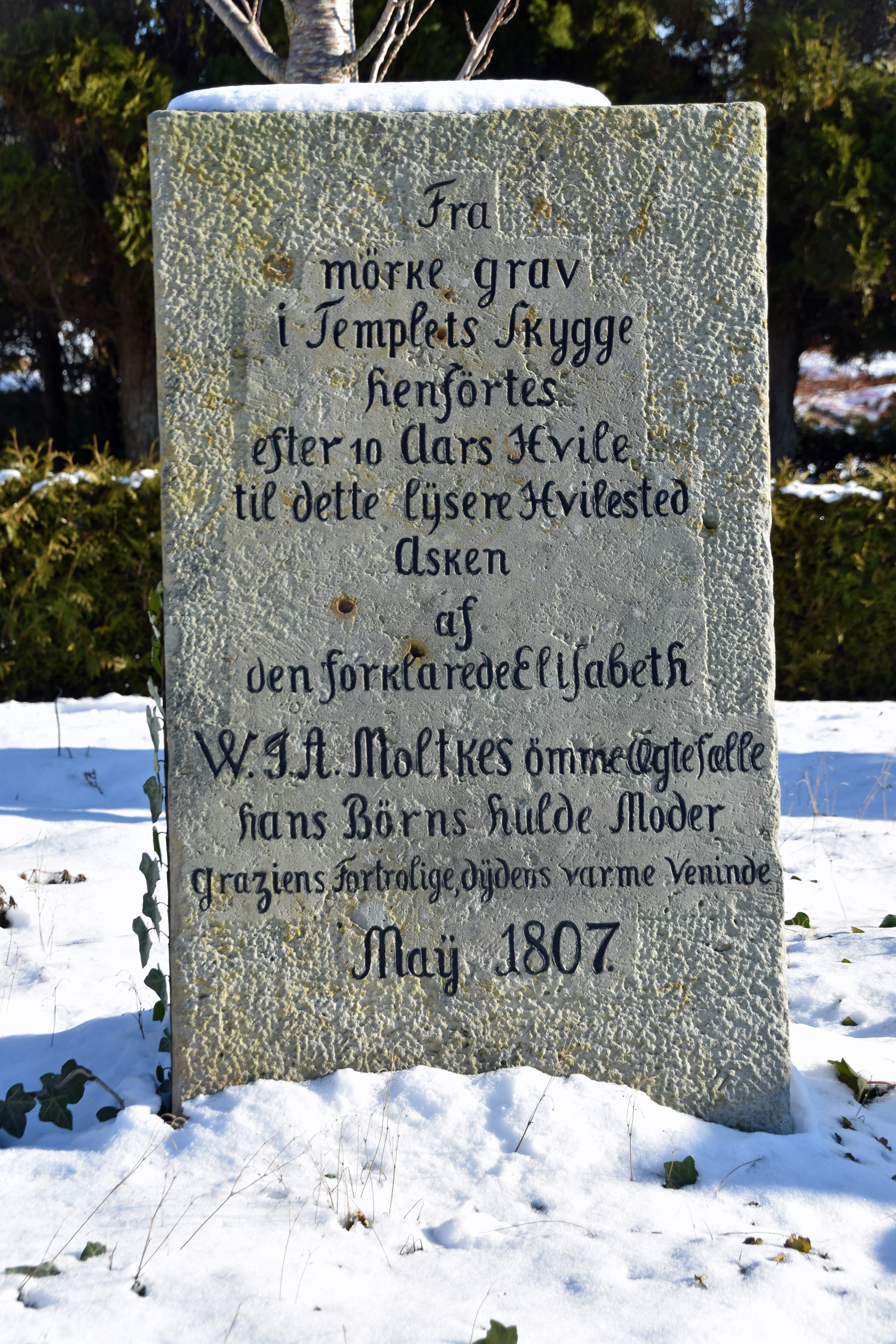
Tombstone of his first wife Uda at Ribe Old Cemetery..

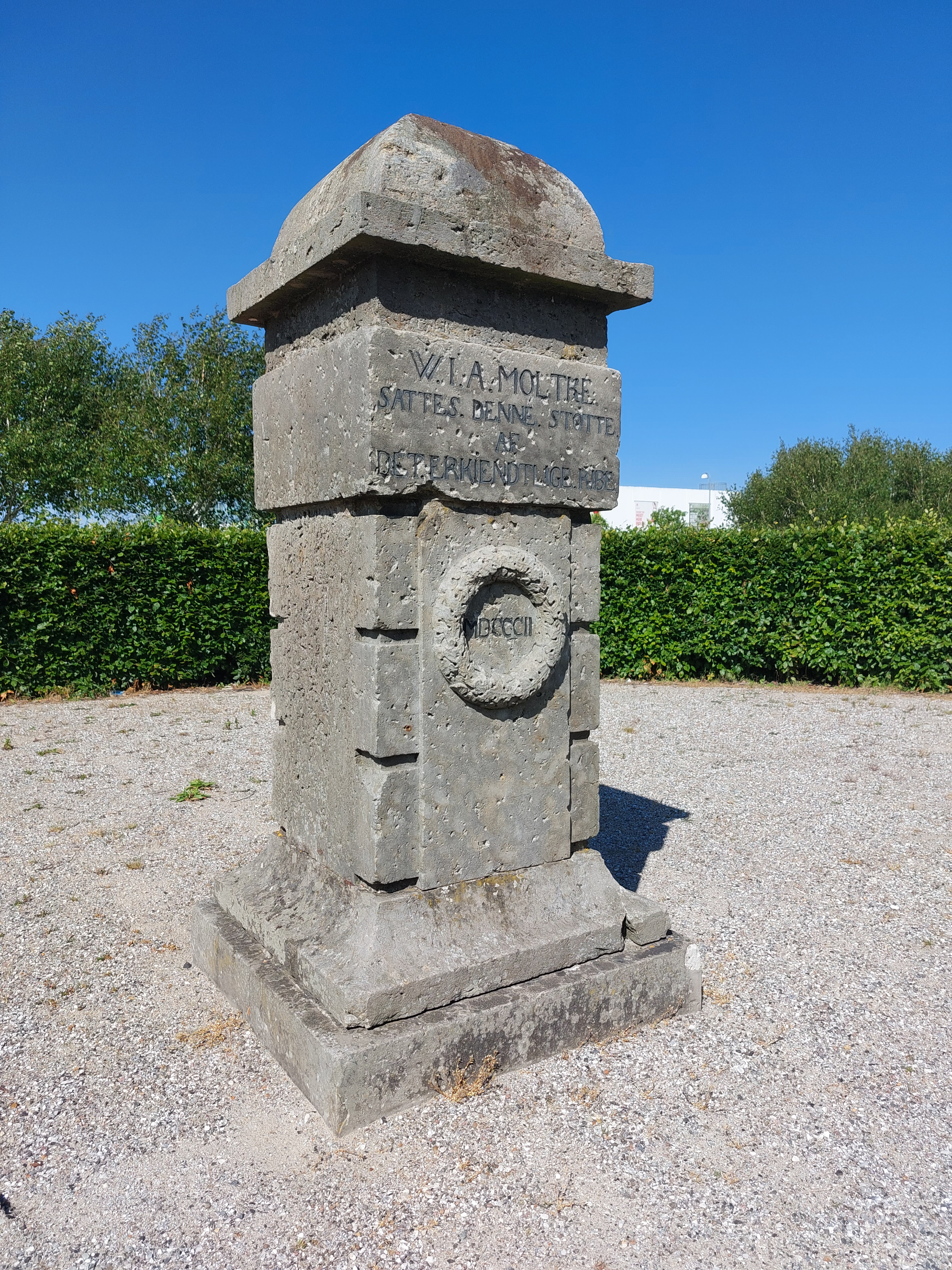
1802 Werner Hasper Moltke Memorial in Ribe.
