= Copenhagen County =

Copenhagen County Københavns Amt (Danish)
- Former county
- Coat of arms

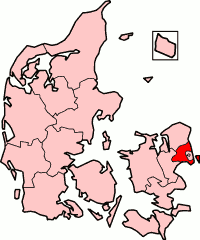
- Copenhagen County in Denmark
- Country: Denmark
- Seat: Glostrup

Area
  - Total: 526 km^{2} (203 sq mi)

Population (2006)
  - Total: 618,529

Copenhagen County (Danish: Københavns Amt) is a former county (amt) on the island of Zealand (Sjælland) in eastern Denmark. It covered the municipalities in the metropolitan Copenhagen area, with the exception of Copenhagen and Frederiksberg. Effective January 1, 2007, the county was abolished and merged into Region Hovedstaden (i.e. Copenhagen Capital Region).

The county was seated in Glostrup (from 1 January 1993; between 1952 and 1992 the county administration was located on Blegdamsvej in Copenhagen Municipality, which was surrounded by, but not part of the county).

== List of County Mayors ==
From	To	County Mayor
April 1, 1970	31 March, 1972	Poul Stochholm (Conservative)
1 April, 1972	31 March, 1974	Viggo Hauch (Venstre)
April 1, 1974	31 December, 1993	Per Kaalund (Social Democrat)
1 January, 1994	December 31, 2006	Vibeke Storm Rasmussen (Social Democrat)

== Municipalities (1970-2006) ==
- Albertslund
- Ballerup
- Brøndby
- Dragør
- Gentofte
- Gladsaxe
- Glostrup
- Herlev
- Hvidovre
- Høje-Taastrup
- Ishøj
- Ledøje-Smørum 2007 merged to form Egedal
- Lyngby-Taarbæk
- Rødovre
- Søllerød merged 2007 to form Rudersdal
- Tårnby
- Vallensbæk
- Værløse merged 2007 to form Furesø
