= Niels Aagesen House =

- Niels Aagesens Gård
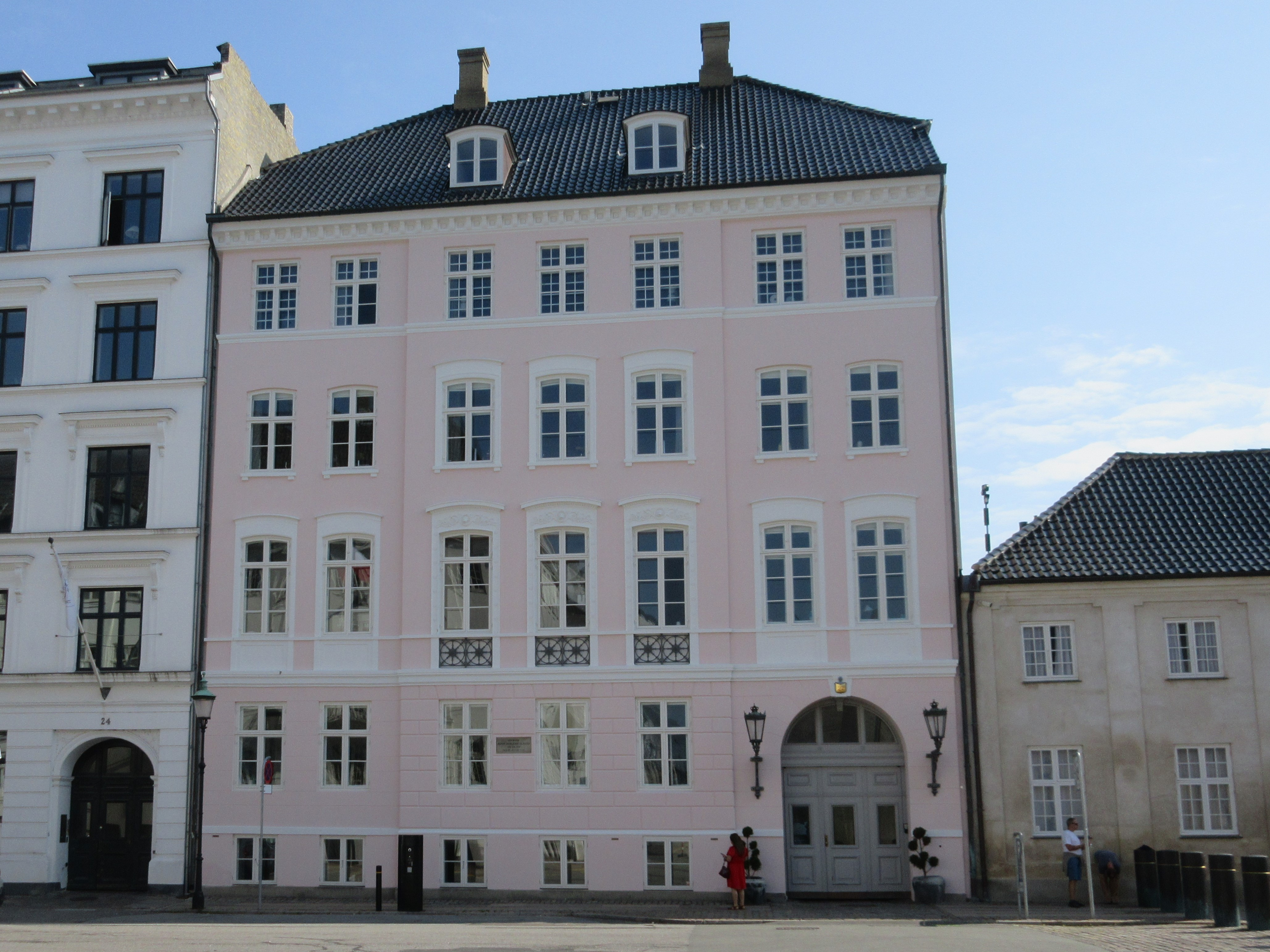
- Interactive map of the Niels Aagesen House area

General information
- Location: Amaliegade 22, Copenhagen, Denmark
- Coordinates: 55°41′5.48″N 12°35′39.01″E
- Completed: 1751

Design and construction
- Architect: Niels Eigtved

The Niels Aagesen House (Danish: Niels Aagesens Gård), Amaliegade 22, is a property situated next to Amalienborg Palace in central Copenhagen, Denmark. It takes its name after Niels Aagesen, a timber merchant for whom it was built as one of the first then-new district Frederiksstaden. It was then a two-storey townhouse built in undressed, red brick to a design by Niels Eigtved who had also created the masterplan for the district. It was not until the 1840 that it was converted into a four-storey apartment building. It was listed on the Danish register of protected buildings and places in 1945. A plaque on the facade commemorates that the poet Adam Oehlenschläger died in the building on 20 November 1840. Other notable former residents include the naval officer Steen Andersen Bille, Tivoli Gardens-founder Georg Carstensen, medical doctor Ole Bang, diplomat and minister H. E. Reedtz (1800-1857), politician Christian Albrecht Bluhme (1794-1866), General Christian de Meza (1792-1865) and politician Aleth Hansen.

== History ==
=== 18th century ===
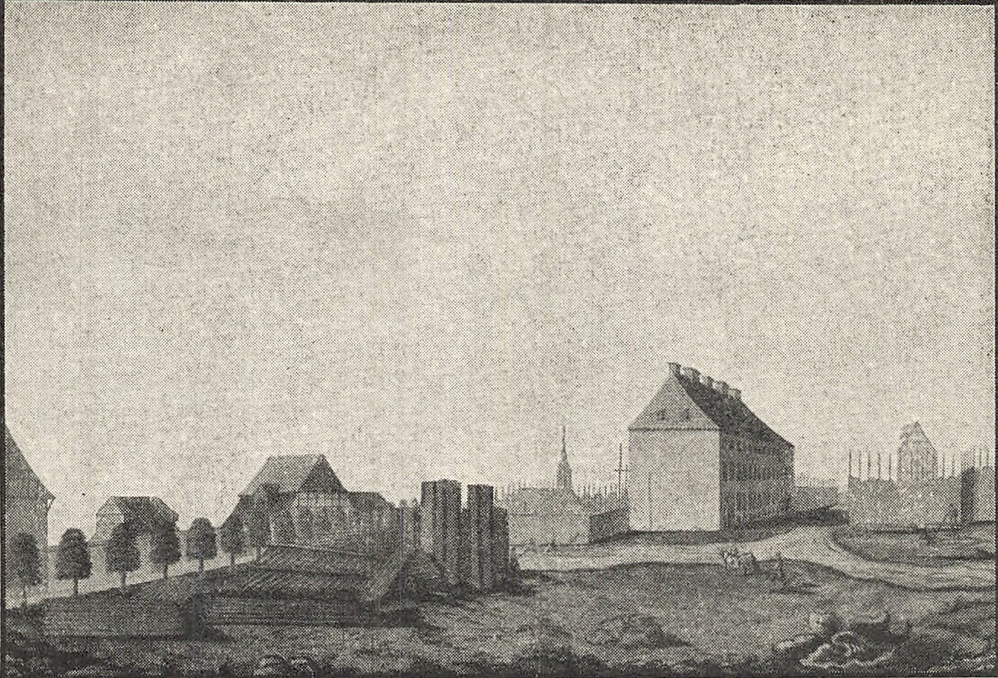
Niel Aagesen's twi buildings shortly after they were completed in 1751. The building to the left is one of the half-timbered rear wings of the Morten Farum House on the other side of the street.

When Frederiksstaden was built, the timber merchants who owned the timber yards along the waterfront were given the first right to purchase the new plots. One of these timber merchants was Niels Aagesen. He bought three adjoining lots (each of them 20 alen wide) just north of the four Amalienborg mansions. He just the site for the construction of two identical houses, each of them seven bays wide, with a facade crowned by a three-bay triangular pediment. The houses were constructed in undressed, red brick to designs by Niels Eigtved who had also created the masterplan for the new district. The two houses were already completed in 1751 as some of the first buildings in the neighbourhood. The southern house was constructed for Aagesen's own use. The other one was immediately sold. Aagesen kept the house until his death. In 1763, his widow sold it to geheimeråd Levetzau. In the same year, on 23 May, 1671, Parsberg was raised to Count.

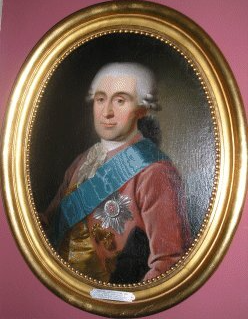
Joachim Otto Schack-Rathlou.

Aagesen's property was listed in the new cadastre of 1756 as part of the vast No. 71 in St, Ann's East Quarter. It was later referred to as No. 71 F 2. The property was marked on Christian Gedde's 1757 cadastral map of St. Ann's East Quarter as No. 336.

The writer and historian Tyge Rothe (1731-1795) resided in the building in 1772. Joachim Otto Schack-Rathlou (1728-1800) were among the residents from 1773 to 1782.

=== Haxthausen family ===
The property was at later acquired by baron Gregers Christian Haxthausen Gregers Christian Haxthausen. He had a long career as a diplomat and government official. On 1 April 1787, he was appointed as Diocesal governor of Zealand.

Haxthausen resided in the building with his second wife Anne Elisabeth Haxthausen (née Juel) and their 24-year-old son Ove Christian Haxthausen at the 1801 census. Their staff comprised two cooks (one male and one female), three male servants, three maids, a coachman and a caretaker.

Haxthausen died on 10 July 1802. He is buried in Golmen Church. The property was listed in the new cadastre of 1806 as No. 126 in St. Ann's East Quarter. It belonged to It belonged to one Anne Elisabeth Haxthausen (née Juel) at that time.

=== Bille family ===
In c. 1816, Steen Andersen Bille (1751-1833) bought the building. From 1803 to 1815, he had lived in one half of the Bernstorff Mansion. Their son Niels Andersen Bille Jr. lived there with them from 1828 to 1829.

Bille died on 15 April 1833. At the 1834 census, Frederikke Vilhelmine Charlott Bille (née Bornemann, 1770-1851) resided in the building with her granddaughter Frederike Marie Levetzau, three male servants and three maids.

=== 1840–1900 ===
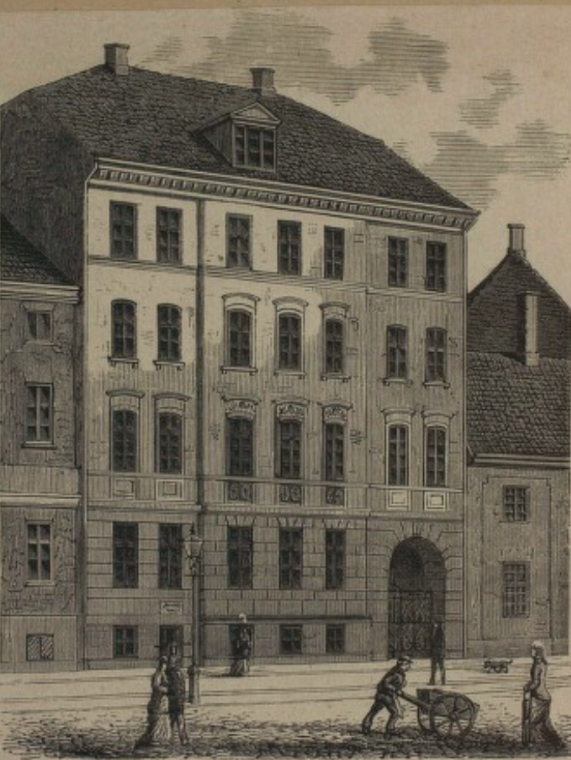
The building in the 19th century

Niels Christensen, a concierge, resided in the building at the 1840 census. He lived there with his wife Juliane Andrea Christensen (née Holst) and their six children (aged three to 14).

Niels Christensen was still the concierge of the building at the 1845 census. He lived there with his wife Juliane Holst and four children (aged seven to 12).

The building was later acquired by master builder Christian Olsen Aagaard (1790–1858). In 1845-1846, he heightened the building. Aagaard had previously also engaged in a number of other construction projects, including the construction of Store Kannikestræde 15, Store Kongensgade 23–25 and Krigsråd Mørks Minde. Tivoli Gardens-founder Georg Carstensen lived in the building in 1847.

The medical doctor Ole Bang resided in the second-floor apartment at the 1850 census. Ulrik Nicolai Fugl (1807-1867), a military prosecutor, notarius publicus in Copenhagen and later bank manager of Privatbanken, resided on the third floor with his wife Henriette Caroline Augusta Fugl (née Moe, 1719-1761), their six children, a nanny, a male servant and a maid.

In 1850, Adam Oehlenschläger moved to an apartment in the building. He died there on 20 November the same year. The diplomat and minister H. E. Reedtz (1800-1857) lived there in the early 1850s and the politician Christian Albrecht Bluhme (1794-1866) lived there in 1855. General Christian de Meza (1792-1865) lived in the building in 1858 and again in 1864-1865. Aleth Hansen, who had recently served as Minister of Education, lived briefly in the building in 1870.

=== 20th and 21st centuries ===
The military physician Martin Ingwersen Grønlund (1856-) was the owner of the building in 1908. He was a board member of the Association of Military Physicians.

Princess Thyra acquired the building in 1930. She lived there until her death in 1945.

Shortly after World War II, Amaliegade 22 was acquired by publisher Valdemar Richter-Friis (1896–1976).

In the 2000s, Amaliegade 22s belonged to Poul Kjærgaard Balle-Petersen. In 2008, he sold it for DKK 86 million to Christian Levin. In 2017, Levin sold it to Claus Molbech Bendtsen for DKK 135 million.

== Today ==
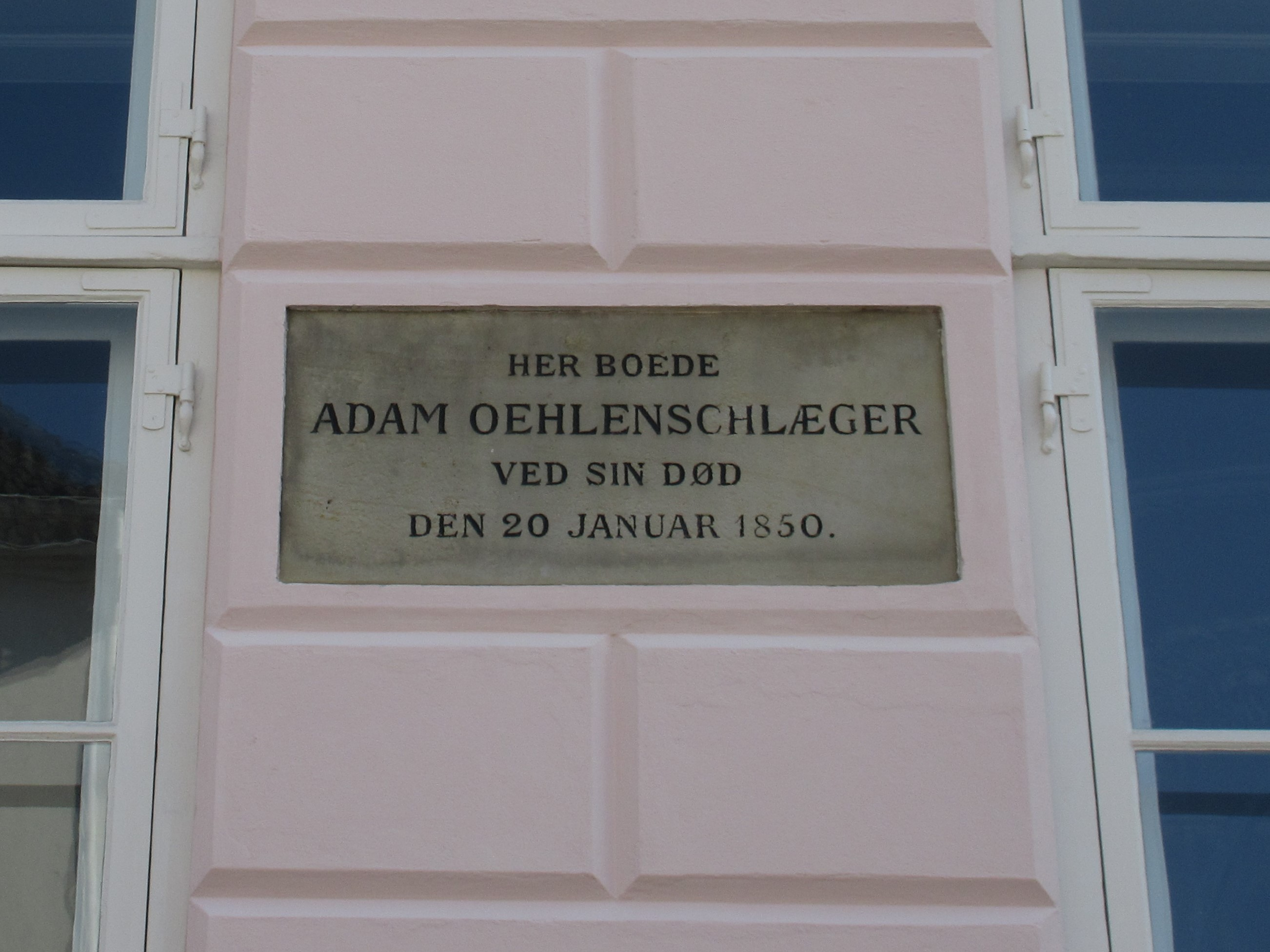
The commemorative plaque

The building has a total floor area of 2,673 square metres, distributed among 11 leases. The tenants include Kønig & Partnere Advokatfirma and Sonha Toft.
