= Krigsråd Mørks Minde =

Danish women's charity

- Krigsråd Mørks Minde
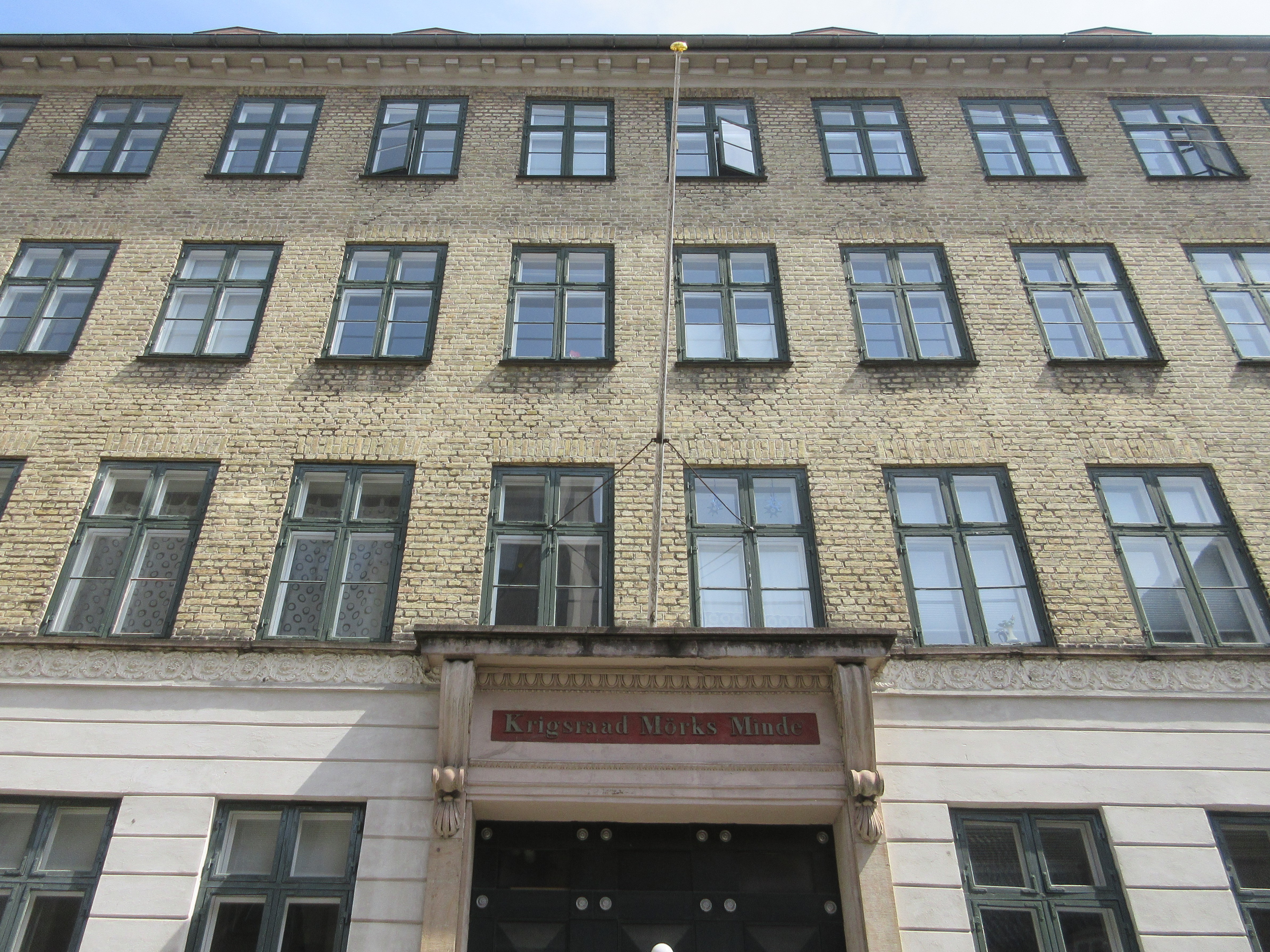
- Interactive map of the Krigsråd Mørks Minde area

General information
- Location: Copenhagen, Denmark
- Coordinates: 55°40′48.65″N 12°34′28.99″E
- Completed: 1831

Krigsråd Mørks Minde, situated at Lille Kannikestræde 4, is a charity with affordable accommodation for widows and unmarried women from the higher classes in Copenhagen, Denmark, established by Emilie Henriette Mørk (Mørch) in 1864–65 in memory of her father, Claudius Mørch, who was awarded the title of krigsråd. The Neoclassical building was constructed by master mason Christian Aagaard in 1830–31. It was listed in the Danish registry of protected buildings and places in 1950. Notable former residents include actor Ludvig Phister, cookbook writer Anne Marie Mangor, painter Emil Carlsen and Professor Nicolai Christopher Kall Rasmussen.

== History ==
=== Early history ===
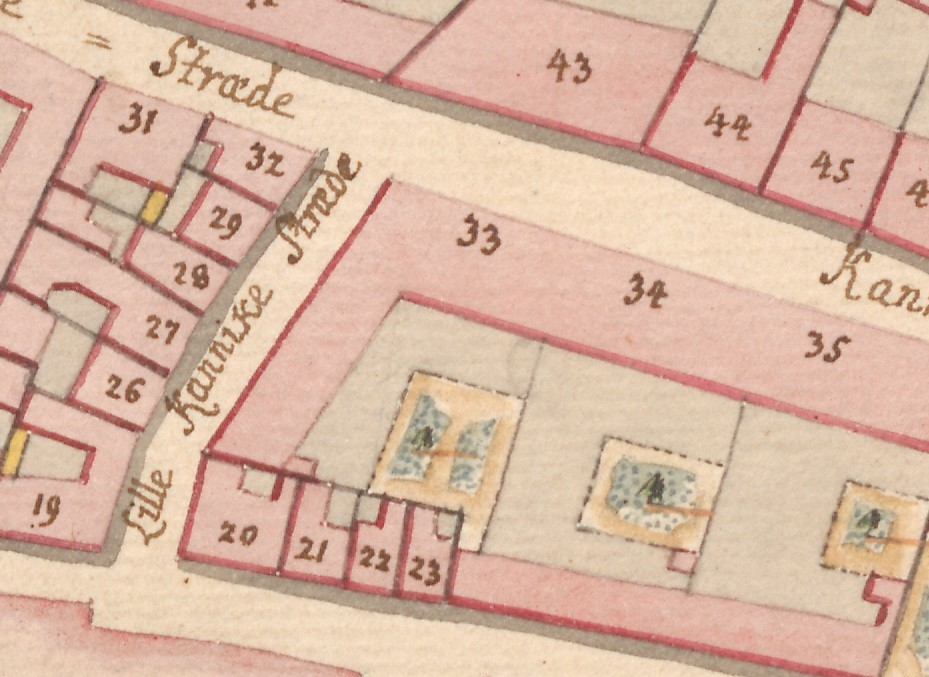
No. 33 seen on a detail from Christian Gedde's map of Klædebo Quarter, 1757.

Store Kannikestræde was formerly dominated by a series of houses available to professors at the University of Copenhagen. Some of these houses, situated at the corner of Store Kannikestræde and Lille Kannikestræde, were in the middle of the 18th century destroyed by fire. Four of the properties were subsequently merged into a single large property, listed in Copenhagen's new cadastre of 1756 as No. 33 in Klædeby Quarter and still described as a fire site at that time. The property comprised what is now Store Kannikestræde 15 and Lille Kannikestræde 4.

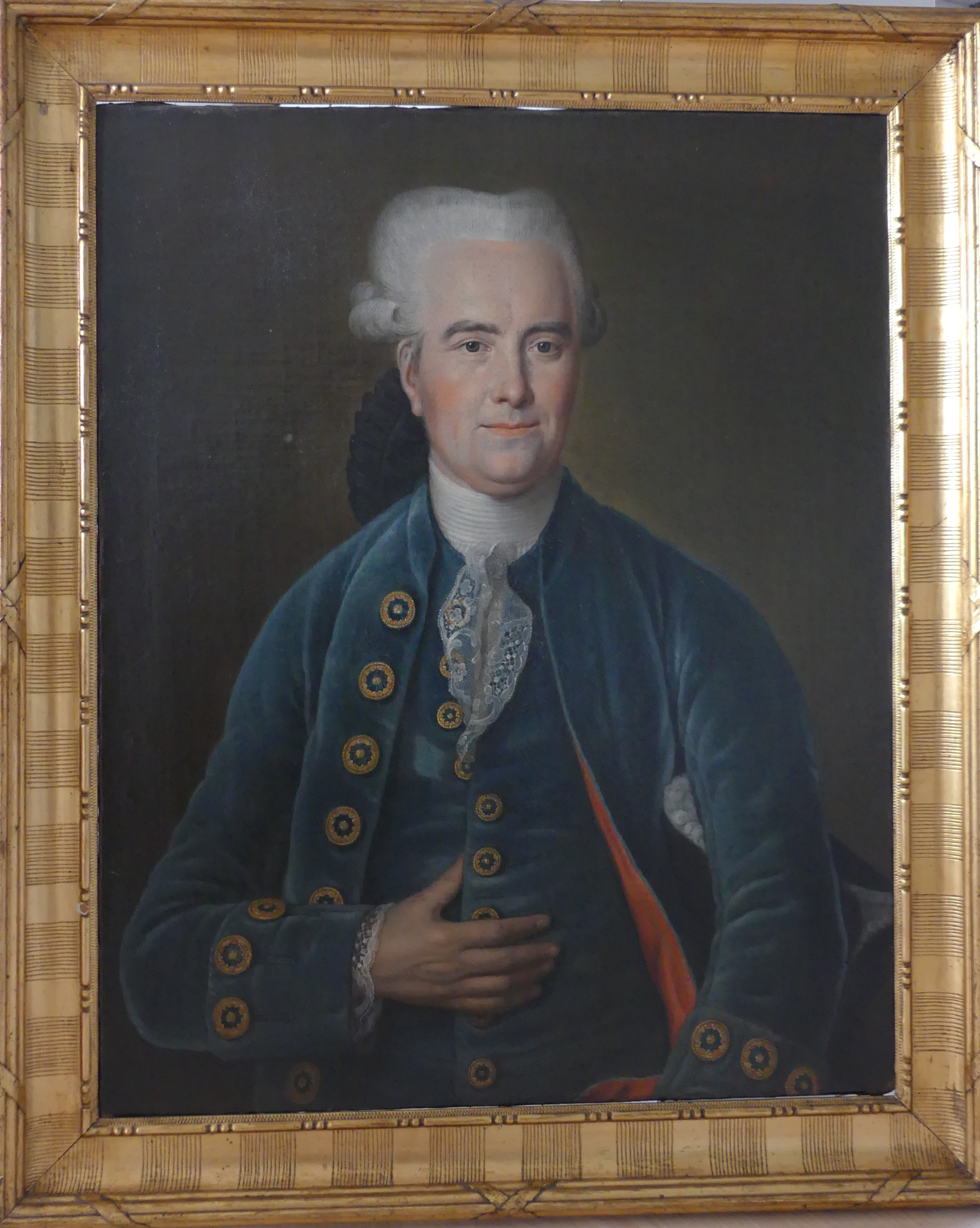
Balthasar Gebhard von Obelitz

A new house was later constructed on the property by the university. The house was put at the disposal of Balthasar Gebhard von Obelitz, a professor of law, Supreme Court justice and the university's rector in 1776–77. He lived there with his wife Christiane Birgitte Gaarder, two sons from his first marriage (aged 15 and 24), his wife's sister Anne Sophie Gaarder, his youngest son's tutor (hofmester) Jens Worm Begtrup, a male servant, a caretaker, a housekeeper, a female cook and three maids at the time of the 1787 census.

The property was listed as No. 35 in the new cadastre of 1807. It was still occupied by Balthasar Gebhard von Obelits at that time.

The buildings were destroyed by fire during the British bombardment in 1807.

=== Aagaard and the new building ===
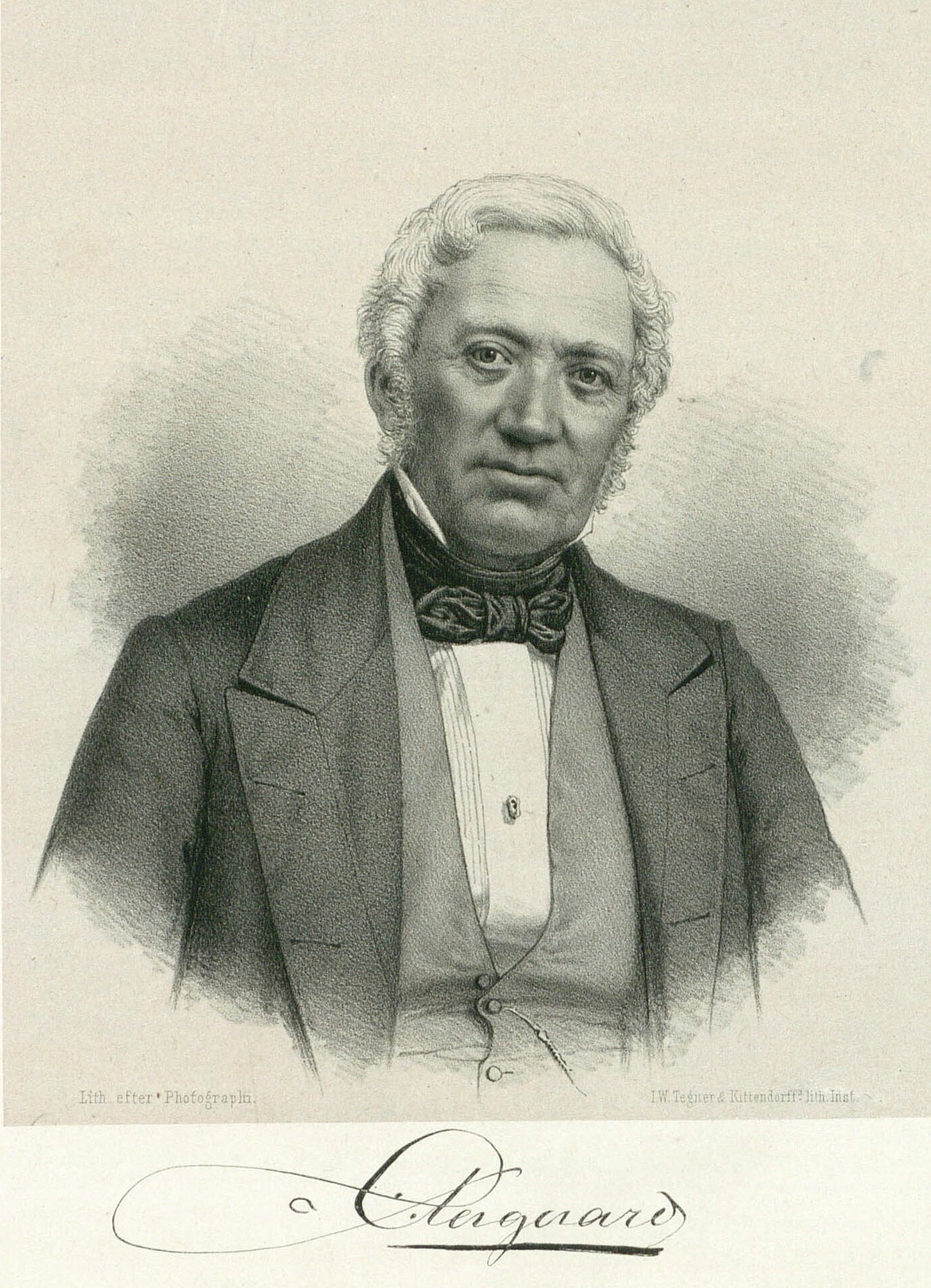
Christian Olsen Aagaard

The property No. 35 was at some point acquired by master mason Christian Aagaard and subsequently divided into two separate properties, from then on referred to as No. 35A and No. 35B. The new corner building (No. 35B) was constructed by Aagaard in 1828–29. The building in Lille Kannikestræde (No. 35A) was constructed by him in 1830–31. Aagaard would later also construct the two buildings at Store Kongensgade 23–25.

The actor Ludvig Phister and his first wife, Charlotte, daughter of the poet Adam Oehlenschläger, resided in one of the apartments from 1834. Ludvig Phister moved back to his childhood home at Nikolah Plads 30 in 1835, possibly prompted by the death of his wife the same year.

=== 1840 census ===
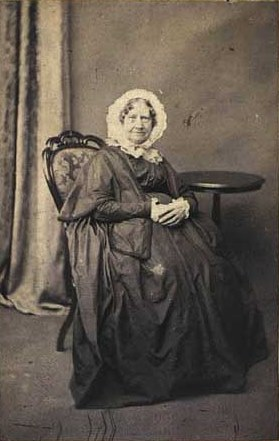
Anne Marie Mangor

The property was home to 49 residents in ten households at the 1840 census. The actress Eline Marie Heger (née Schmidt), who was ill at the moment, resided in one of the ground floor apartments with her daughters Eline Marie Agier (née Heger) and Juliane Sophie Heger and one maid. Christian Michael Skou. a secretary in the Copenhagen Police Force, resided in the other ground floor apartment with his wife Franzisca Sophie Danty, their one-year-old daughter and one maid. Christian Ludvig Qvist, a master mason and lieutenant in the Copenhagen Fire Corps, resided in one of the two first floor apartments with his wife Henriette Evert, one male servant and one maid. Annette Hnut, widow of one customs officer Schmidt, resided in the other first floor apartment with her daughter Hanne Schmidt, one maid and one lodger (copyist in Rentekammeret). Cecilie Elisabeth Holde, widow of one Cancelliraad Scgmidt, resided in one of the second floor apartments with her daughters Emilie Christine and Emma Gynitta (aged 21 and 25). Pouline Holmm widow of constructor in the Royal Danish Navy Holm, resided in the other second floor apartment with her three children (aged two to 11), one maid, the 28-year-old lodger Andreas Frederik Raasløv (lawyer) and Raasløv's three-year-old son Frederik Emil Constantin Raasløv. Else Kirstine Larsen and Johanne Margrethe Larsen—two sisters—resided in one of the third floor apartments with their younger brother Christian Andres Larsen and one maid. Anne Marie Mangor (née Bang), widow of merchant Valentin Nicolai Mangor and herself a successful cookbook writer, resided in the other third floor apartment with her daughter Hanne Mangor, one maid and two lodgers. Franziskus Pjerre, a merchant (grosserer), resided in the basement with his wife Juliane Sophie Henningsen, their four children (aged one to 10) and one maid. Rasmus Christensen, an innkeeper, resided in the basement with his wife Charlotte Lovise Matisen and their five children (aged four to 13).

Professor at the university N. M. Petersen (1791-1862) resided in one of the apartments from 1846 to 1847.

=== Emilie Mørk and her tenants ===
In the middle of the 1840s, No. 35A was acquired by Emilie Mørk. She was the daughter of Claudius Mørch (1759-1813) and Johamme Marie Mørch (née Bjørn). Her father, who had succeeded Georg Mathias Fuchs as drawing instructor at the Royal Danish Naval Academy, was awarded the titles of krigsassessor (1805) and krigsråd. His death in 1813 seemed to leave his wife and two daughters in rather difficult economic circumstances. It is therefore not known how his daughter was later able to buy such a large property, but it was most likely due to an inheritance.

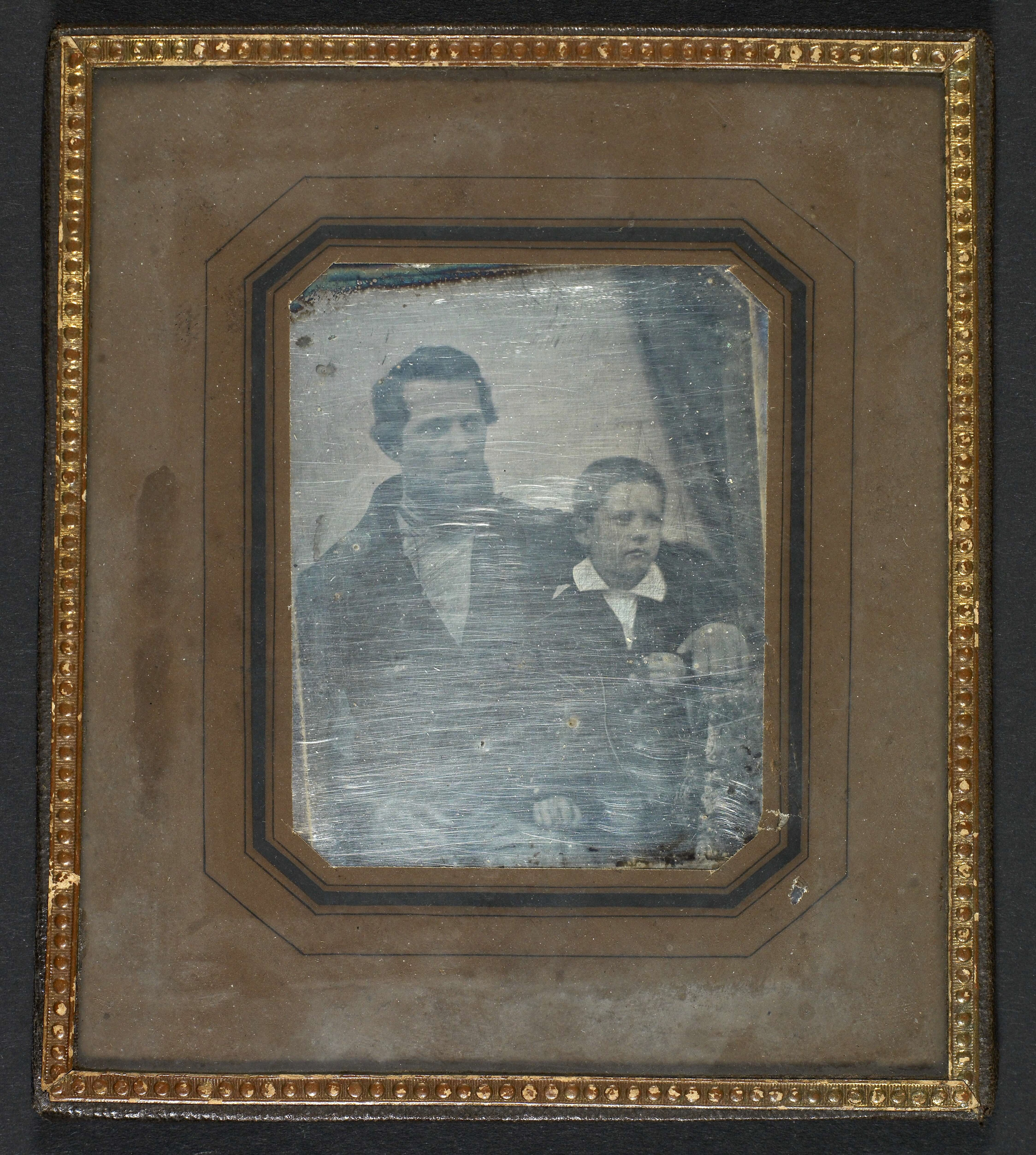
Grocer Carl Adolph Janus Carlsen and his eldest son Janus Michael Carlsen.

The property was home to 34 residents at the 1860 census. Carl Adolph Janus Carlsen. a grocer (urtekræmmer), resided in one of the ground floor apartments with his wife Dorthea Carlsen, their three sons (aged five to 17) and one maid. Anna Dorthea Raae was an amateur floral painter. Two of their sons, Emil and Carl Carlsen, would later also become painters. Hans Bach Soetmand, a cantor, resided in the other ground floor apartment with his wife Jørgine Kirstine Soetmand and one maid. Carl Wilhelm Dau (1804-1874), an army major in the 4th Infantry Battalion, resided on the second floor with his wife Augusta Dau (née Andersen and one maid. Edvard Carl Warburg, a ship captain, resided on the first floor. Elisabeth Kirsteen (née Thomsen), a 72-year-old widow, resided on the second floor. Michael Nicolai Christopher Kall Rasmussen, professor of history at the University of Copenhagen and archivist for the Kgl Geheime Arkiv, resided on the third floor with his wife Christine Nicoline Mathilde Kall Rasmussen (née Reimer) and one maid. Johan Christian Møller, a master shoemaker, resided in the basement with his wife Petronelle Møller, their four children (aged seven to 13) and one maid. Else Christine Larsen and Johanne Magrethe Larsen—the two sisters from the 1840 census—resided in the other third floor apartment with the third sister Oline Christiane Larsen. Johan Henrik Schmitz, a shoemaker (skomagersvend, probably employed by Møller), resided in the basement towards the yard with his wife Rosaline Dorthea Schmitz. Jens Larsen, a grocer (høker), resided in the basement with his wife Ida Vilhelmine Charlotte Larsen and their one-year-old daughter.

=== Krigsråd Mørks Minde ===
Shortly prior to her death in August 1864, by testament, Emilie Mørk left behind her property as a charitable foundation with affordable accommodation for widows and unmarried women from the higher classes. The foundation was officially incorporated on 14 February 1865, the founder's 70th birthday. Later residents included five unmarried daughters of the painter Christoffer Wilhelm Eckersberg.

== Architecture ==
The building is constructed in yellow brick with four storeys over a walk-out basement. The ten bays wide facade os finished with a frieze with rosette ornamentation below the first floor windows and a modillioned cornice. It is below the frieze plastered and finished with shadow joints. The green-painted central gate is topped by a hood mould supported by corbels. The name of the building is written on red background between the gate and the hood mould. The pitched roof features four dormer windows towards the street. The roof ridge is pierced by two chimneys.

== Today ==
Stiftelsen Krigsråd Mørks Minde comprises 28 dwellings for single women in difficult economic circumstances, The garret contains a memorial room with artifacts associated to the founder, her father and some of the former residents.

== Gallery ==
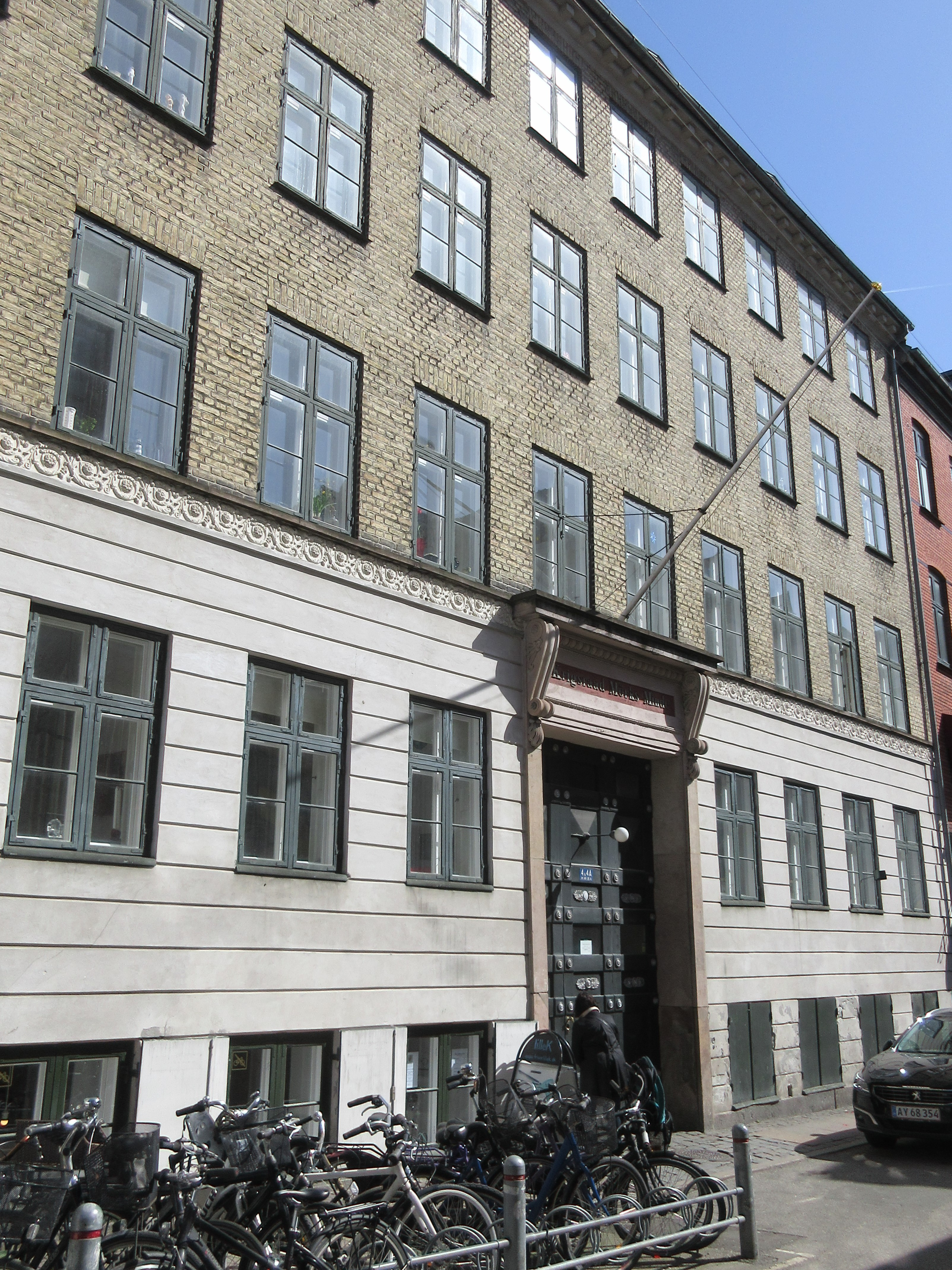
Lille Kannikestr.de 4.

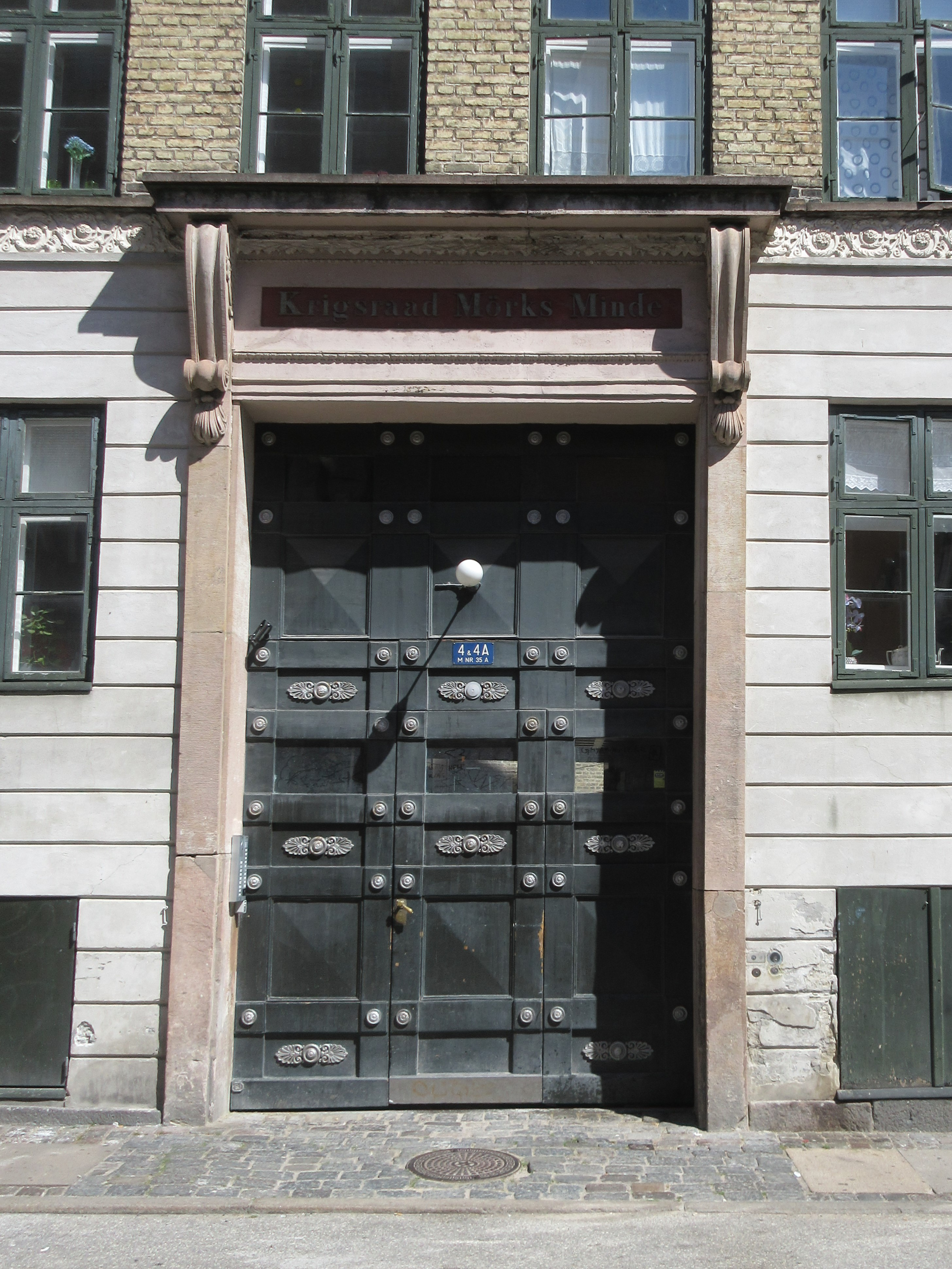
The central gate.

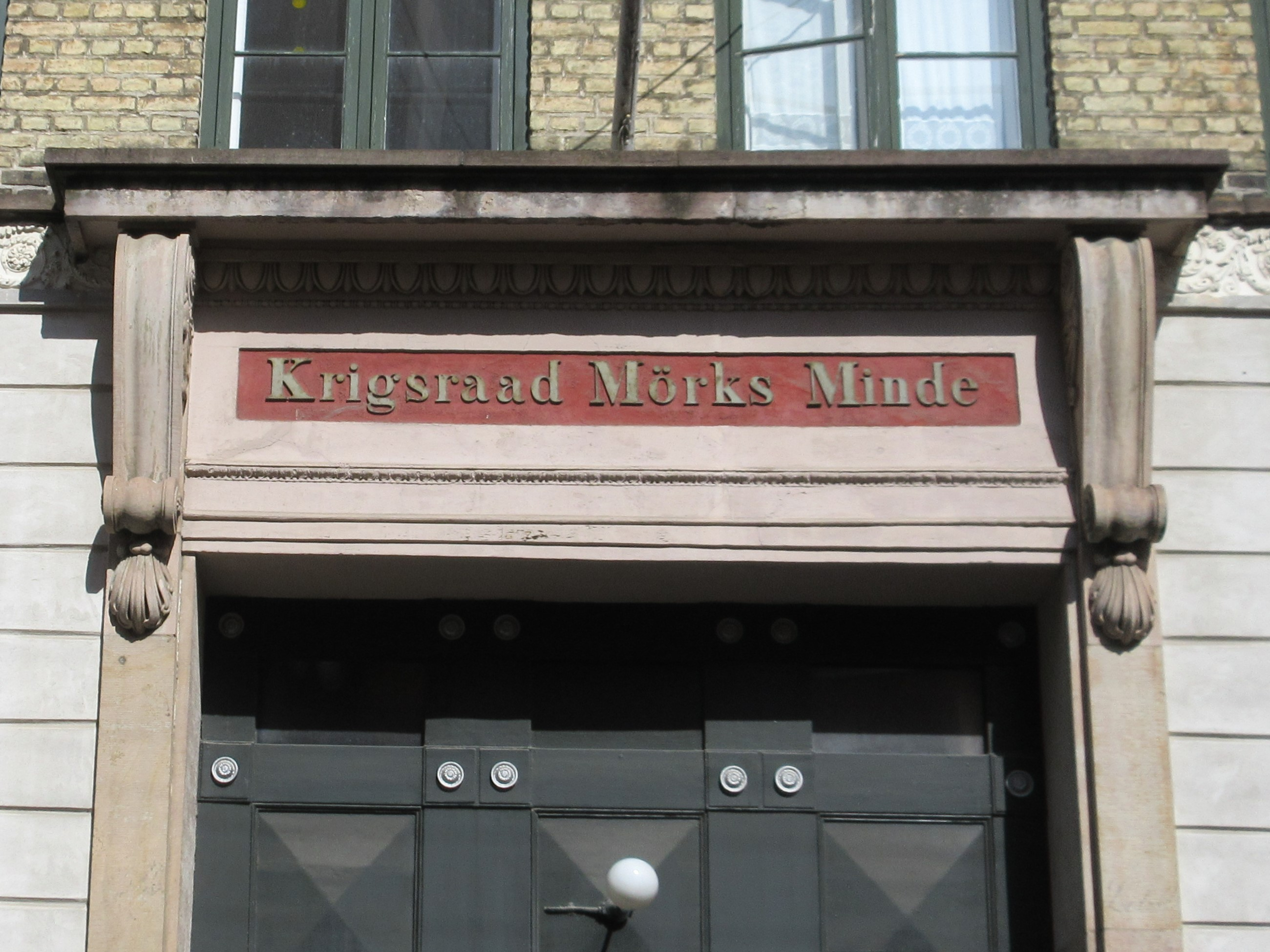
Detail
