= Bernhard Hertz =

Danish goldsmith (1834–1909)

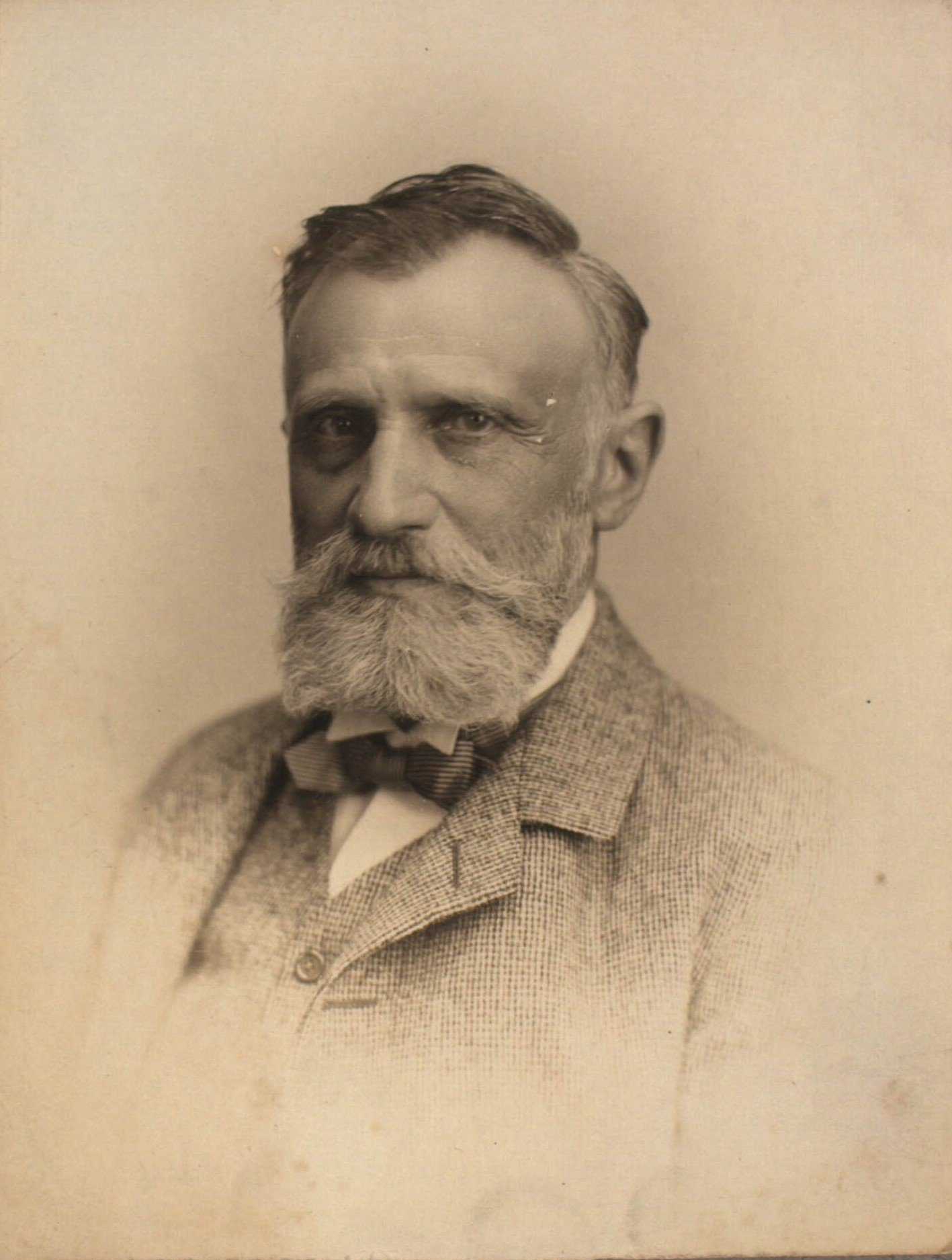
Bernhard Hertz

Bernhard Hertz (1834–1909) was a Danish goldsmith who established a silver factory in Copenhagen named Bernhard Hertz Guldvarefabrik. His former building at Store Kongensgade 23 was listed in the Danish national registry of protected buildings in 1989. His company Bernhard Hertz A/S, founded in 1858, was merged into Lund Copenhagen in 1985.

== Early life and background ==
Bernhard Hertz was born into a well-to-do Jewish family in Copenhagen, He was the fourth of nine children of Abraham Hertz (1799–1885) and Adelaide Meye (1804–1881). His father owned a tannery at Rosenborggade 5. It was later continued by Bernhard's younger son Meyer Hertz as Hertz Garveri & Skotøjsfabrik. His maternal grandfather was the merchant (grosserer) Jacob Salomon Meyer.

== Career ==
Hertz completed his training as a goldsmith in 1858. His graduation piece, an arm ring, was acquired by Frederick VII for 300 Danish rigsdaler and gifted to Countess Danner. The arm ring is now on display in the Danish Design Museum.

Hertz used the money from the sale to set up his own business the same year. He specialized in modern jewellery with flower motifs and replicas of ancient jewellery. The company was a leader in the field of Skønvirke (Art Nouveau) in the early 20th century.

To make his jewellery accessible to a wider customer base, Hertz began to produce the replica of contemporary jewellery in silver instead of gold and introduced machine power in the production for rolling and frosting. In 1887, he constructed a multi-storey factory building in a courtyard in Store Kongensgade. Hertz died in 1909.

== Legacy ==
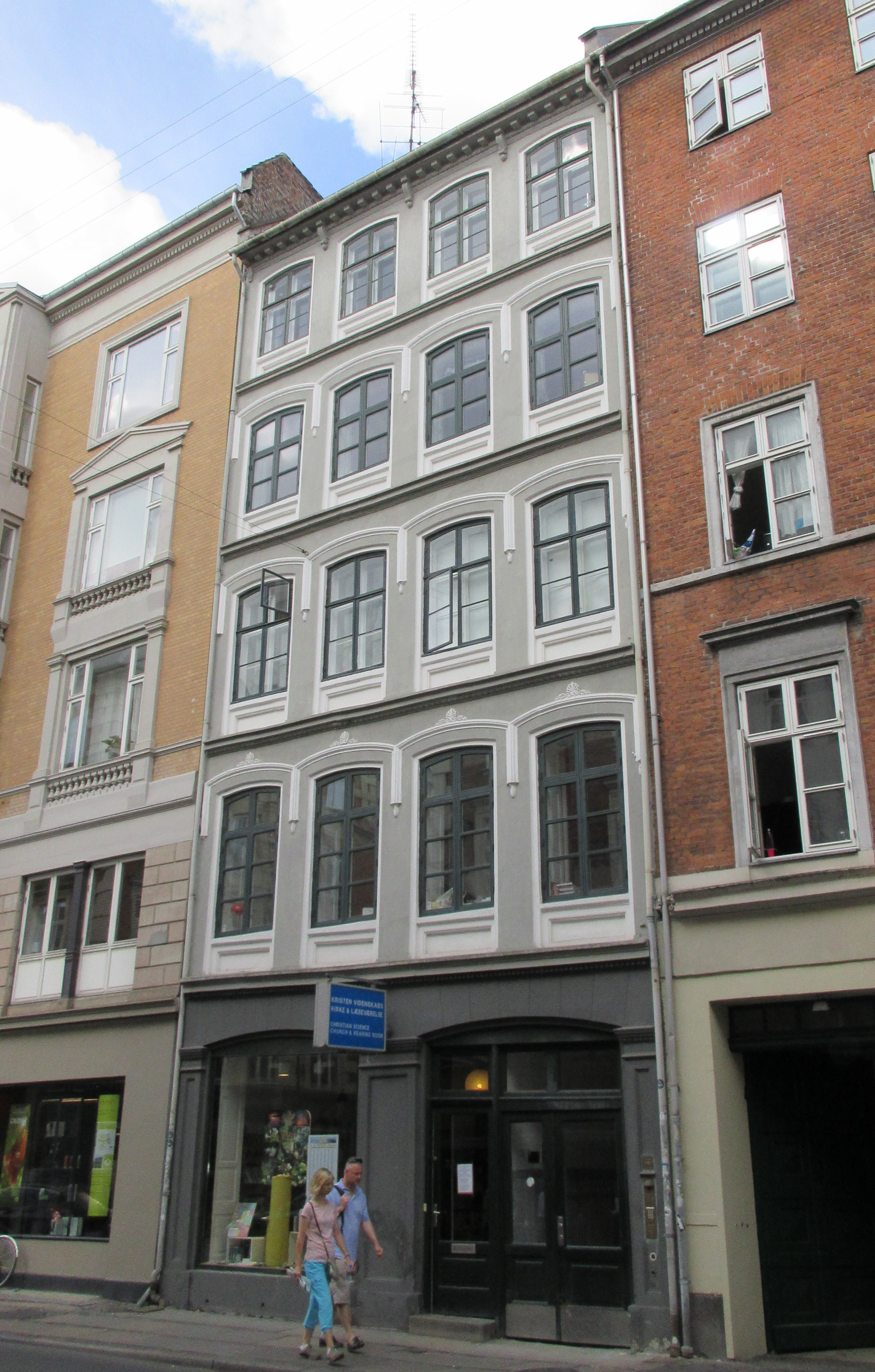
Bernhard Hertz' former premises in Store Kongensgade, Copenhagen. The factory building is located in the courtyard.

The company Bernhard Hertz A/S was acquired by Lund Copenhagen in 1985.

Hertz' former silver factory in Store Kongensgade was listed by the Danish Heritage Agency in the Danish national registry of protected buildings in 1989. The factory was built by Hertz' own design. The older building fronting the street, which was also owned by the company, is also a part of the heritage listing. It is from 1850 and was designed by C.O. Aagaard.

== See also ==
- A. Michelsen
- P. Hertz
