= Søren Henrik Petersen =

Danish print maker

Søren Henrik Petersen (10 January 1788 – 14 May 1860) was a Danish printmaker.

== Early life and education ==
Petersen was born on 10 January 1788 in Copenhagen, the son of saddler Christopher Henning Petersen (1751–1813) and Cecilie Pedersdatter Ebbesen (1752–1827). He studied law at the University of Copenhagen, graduating in 1805. He then settled as a lawyer in Fredensborg.

== Career ==
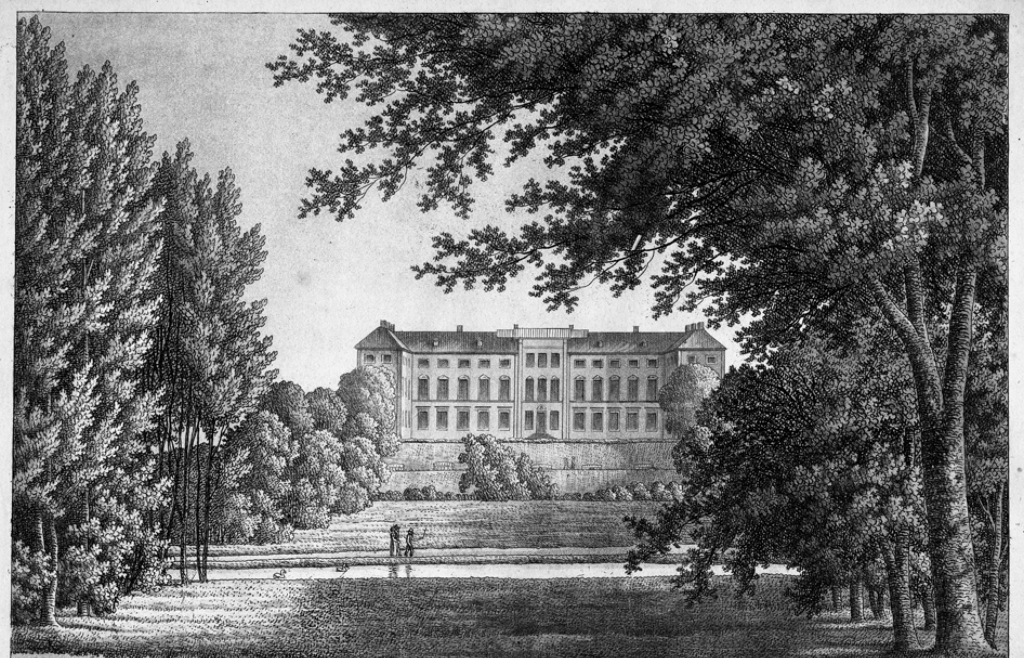
S. H. Petersen: Frederiksberg Palace, 1715

During his law studies, Petersen had also practiced drawing, painting and copperplate engraving. In 1815, he presented some drawings and painted studies to the Royal Danish Academy of Fine Arts for assessment. The feedback inspired him to start attending its classes. He was soon also granted a stipend from Prince Christian. Upon advice from the academy, he chose to pursue a career as a copperplate engraver. In 1917 and 1918, he published two booklets with landscape studies intended for use in the training of landscape artists. In 1818, he discontinued his legal career and settled as a printmaker in Copenhagen. In 1817–19, he exhibited his drawings, watercolours and prints (copperplate engravings, etchings and aquatinte). In 1824–27, he went on a stidu trips in Europe. In 1929, he was associated the academy on the basis of an engraving based on a work by K. J. Fahlcrantz. Another engraving, based on J. Both's Italia, was rejected as his membership work.

== Works ==
Petersen's works include a series of landscape prints entitled Danske landskaber I-VI (with O. Rawert, 1819–23), Malerisk Geographie (1824–27) and Det danske Atlas (with P. W. Becker, 1831–38. not completed).

== Personal life ==
Petersen married on 7 November 1813 in Fredensborg Ane Hedevig Petersen (1792–1857), daughter of ship builder at Orlogsværftet Andreas Torkild (Terkild) Petersen (1760–1846) and Karen Valentin (1760–1824). They had four children, including the book binder Immanuel Petersen. They resided in a second floor apartment at Store Kannikestræde 15 at the time of the 1840 census.

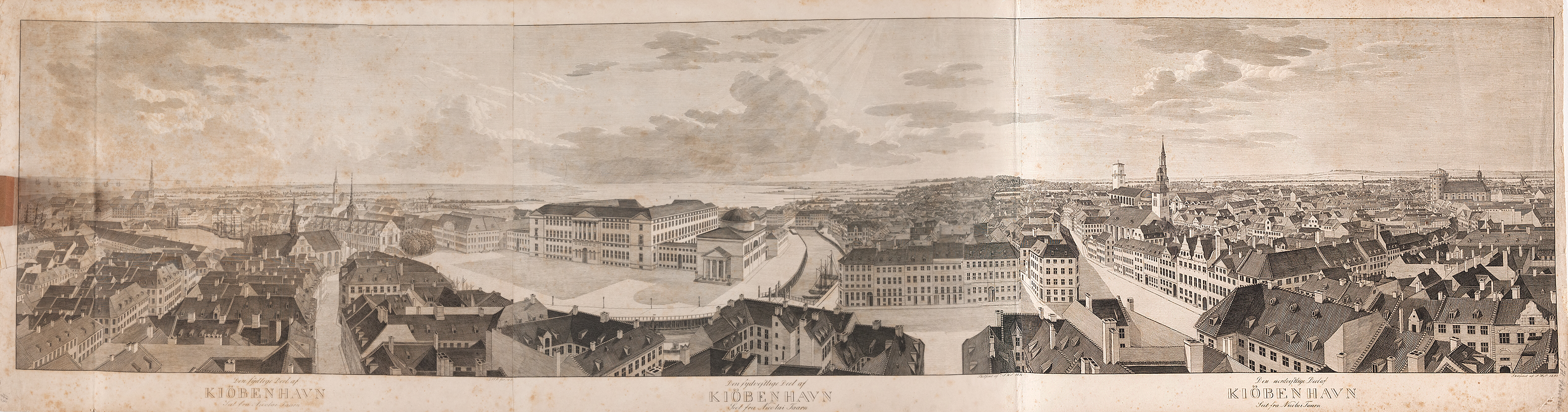
S. H. Petersen: View from Nicioal Tower, 1837
