= Store Kannikestræde 15 =

Property in Copenhagen

- Store Kannikestræde 15
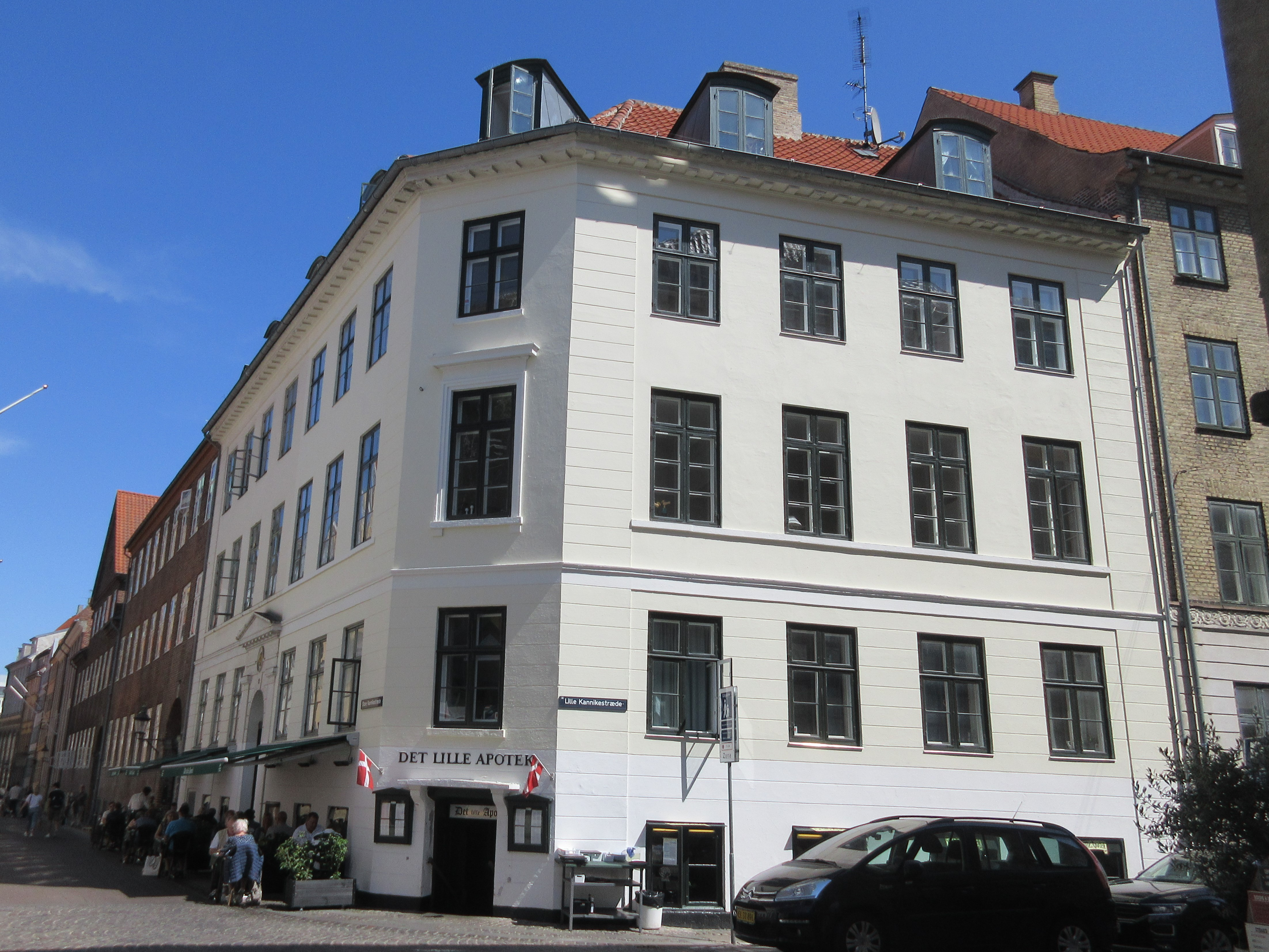
- Interactive map of the Store Kannikestræde 15 area

General information
- Location: Copenhagen, Denmark
- Coordinates: 55°40′49.37″N 12°34′28.67″E
- Completed: 1829

Store Kannikestræde 15 is a Neoclassical property situated at the corner of Store Kannikestræde and Lille Kannikestræde in the Old Town of Copenhagen, Denmark. It was listed in the Danish registry of protected buildings and places in 1950. A plaque on the facade commemorates the fact that Peter Faber was a resident in the building when he wrote Højt fra træets grønne top in 1847. Other notable former residents include the landscape painter Thorald Læsøe, printmaker Søren Henrik Petersen (1788-1860), historian Caspar Frederik Wegener and illustrator Peter Christian Klæstrup.

== History ==
=== Early history ===
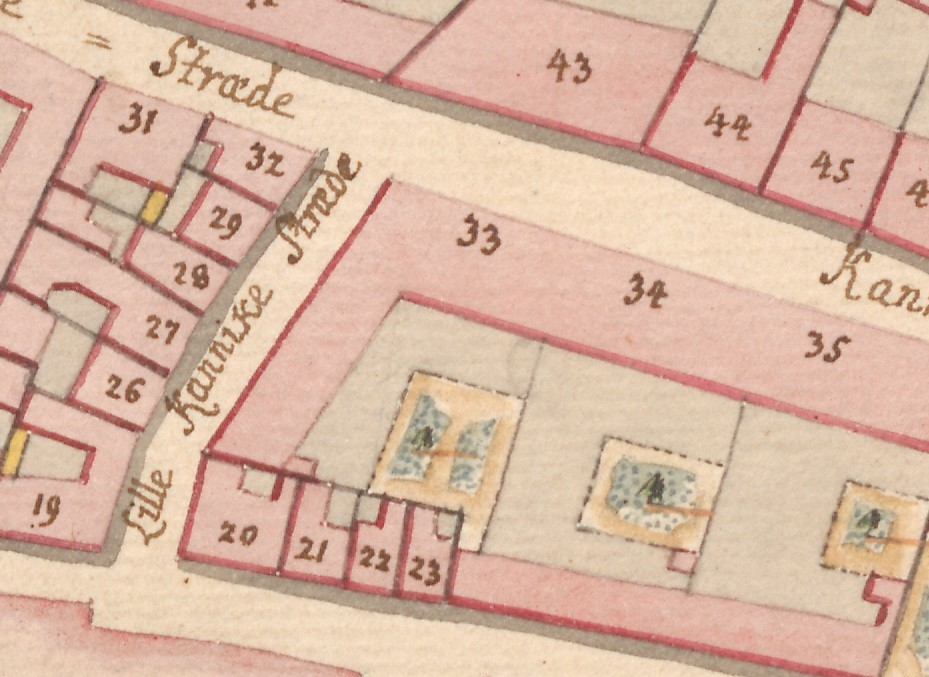
No. 33 seen in a detail from Christian Gedde's map of Klædebo Quarter, 1757

Store Kannikestræde was formerly dominated by a series of houses available to professors at the University of Copenhagen. Some of these houses, situated at the corner of Store Kannikestræde and Lille Kannikestræde, were in the middle of the 18th century destroyed by fire. Four of the properties were subsequently merged into a single large property, listed in Copenhagen's new cadastre of 1756 as No. 33 in Klædeby Quarter and still described as a fire site at that time. The property comprised what is now Store Kannikestræde 15 and Lille Kannikestræde 4.

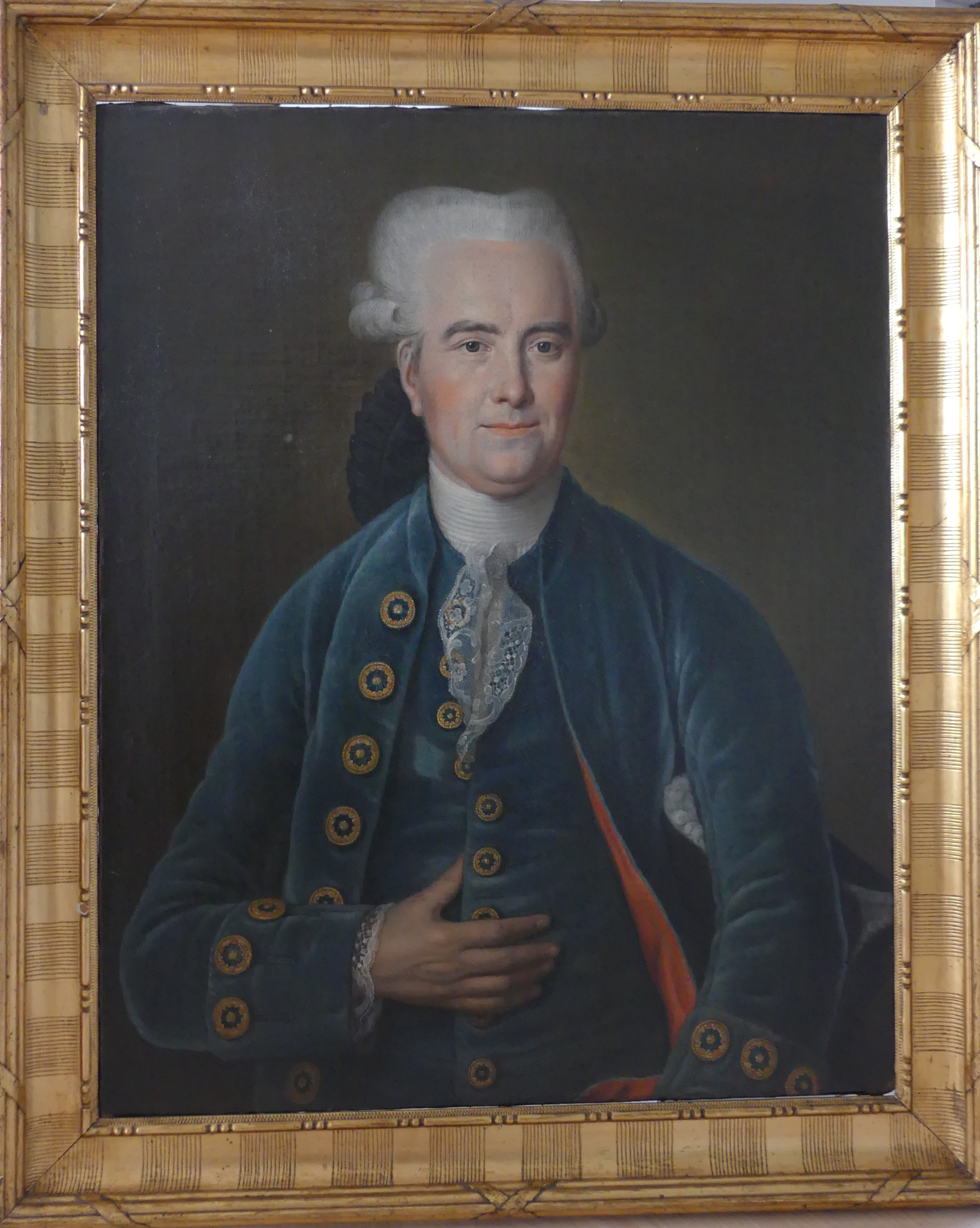
Balthasar Gebhard von Obelitz

A new house was later constructed on the property by the university. The house was put at the disposal of Balthasar Gebhard von Obelitz, a professor of law, Supreme Court justice and the university's rector in 1776–77. He lived there with his wife Christiane Birgitte Gaarder, two sons from his first marriage (aged 15 and 24), his wife's sister Anne Sophie Gaarder, his youngest son's tutor (hofmester) Jens Worm Begtrup, a male servant, a caretaker, a housekeeper, a female cook and three maids at the time of the 1787 census.

The property was listed as No. 35 in the new cadastre of 1807. It was still occupied by Balthasar Gebhard von Obelits at that time.

The buildings were destroyed by fire during the British bombardment in 1807.

=== Aagaard and the new building ===
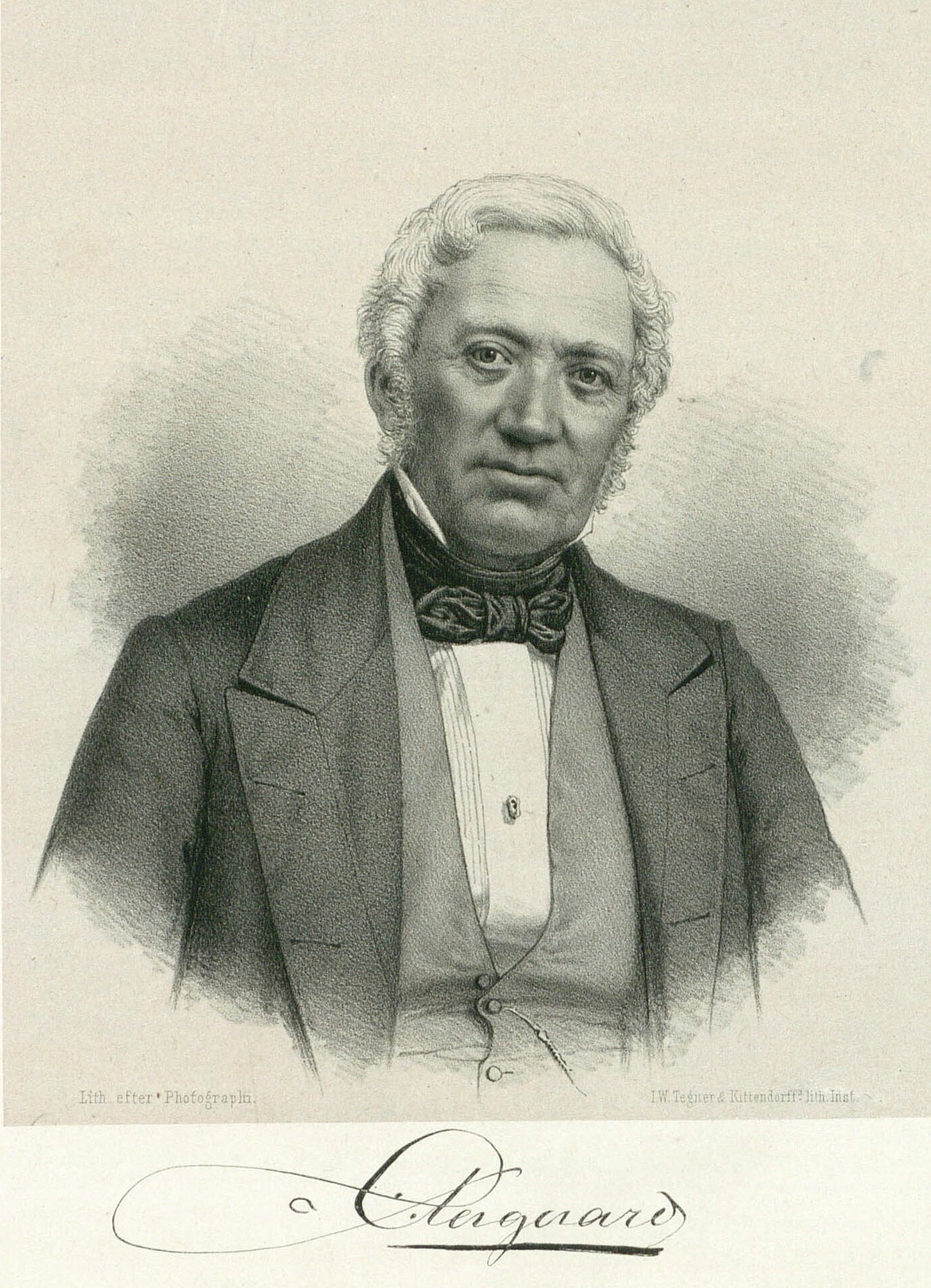
Christian Olsen Aagaard

The property No. 35 was at some point acquired by master mason Christian Aagaard and subsequently divided into two separate properties, from then on referred to as No. 35A and No. 35B. The new corner building (No. 35B) was constructed by Aagaard in 1828–29. The building in Lille Kannikestræde (No. 35A, now Krigsråd Mørks Minde) was constructed by him in 1830–31. Aagaard would later also construct the two buildings at Store Kongensgade 23–25.

=== Boalth family ===
Aagaard may have sold the property to Herman Boalth (1801–1834), an official in the Danish Chancery, born in Tranquebar. His widow, Louise Boalth (née du Puy, 1807–1863), daughter of Édouard Du Puy, is at least mentioned as its owner in 1840. Her property was home to 48 residents in eight households at the 1840 census. Louise Boalth resided on the ground floor to the right with her three children (aged six to 12), her sister Nielsine Du Pay, one male servant and one maid. Christen Andersen, a grave-digger, resided in the ground floor apartment to the left with his wife Marie Andersen, their three-year-old son Walborg Andersen, a 71-year-old widow and one maid. Signe Læssøe, a 59-year-old widow, resided on the first floor to the right with her two sons (aged 22 and 24), two lodgers (aged 15 and 22) and one maid. The elder of the two sons was the landscape painter Thorald Læssøe. Ulrike Hahn, a 60-year-old widow, resided on the first floor to the left with three daughters (aged 27 to 42) and one maid. Christian Aabye, a captain and adjudant in the Kongens Livjægerkorps, resided on the second floor to the right with his wife Ane Margaretha Lindeman, their four children (aged 15 to 21) and one maid. Søren Henrik Petersen (1788-1860), a printmaker (copper plate engraver), resided on the second floor to the left with his wife Ane Hedevig Petersen, their four children (aged four to 24) and one maid. Jens Rasmussen, an innkeeper, resided in the basement to the right with his wife Sidse Rasmussen, their 16-year-old daughter Helene Rasmussen and one maid. Frans Christjan Jensen, a master shoemaker, resided in the basement to the left with his wife Engeborg Magdalene Jensen and their five children (aged six to 19).

Peter Faber, inspector of the College of Advanced Technology, resided in one of the apartments from 1845. In 1847, he wrote Højt fra træets grønne top as part of the preparations for celebrating Christmas Eve in his parents' home at Gråbrødretorv 21. In 1849, he moved to a new apartment at Gammel Strand 40. The historian and archivist Caspar Frederik Wegener resided in one of the apartments from 1849 to 1857.

Louise Boalth was still resident in the ground floor apartment to the right at the time of the 1850 census. She lived there with her three children (aged 16 to 22) and one maid.

=== 1860 census ===
The property was home to 37 residents at the 1860 census. Christian Preetzmann, a policeman, resided on the ground floor with his wife Henriette Preetzmann, their five-year-old son Johannes Adam Christian Preetzmann and two maids. Vilhelm Julius Berg, a master klein smith and captain in the Copenhagen Fire Corps, resided on the first floor with his wife Caroline Albine Berg, their three children (aged one to seven), his mother-in-law Else Kirstine Bruun and one maid. One of the three sons was the later architect Axel Berg. Vilhelmine Bardenfleth, a former maid, resided in the other first floor apartment with her son Emil Güedeucame (law student) and one maid. Frederikke Hedevig Damm (1801-1880), widow of August Leopold Damm (1800-1845), resided on the second floor with three of her children (aged 19 to 26) and one maid. Rasmus Jacobsen, a new innkeeper, resided in the basement with his wife Karen Jacobsen, their three children (aged two to seven), one maid and two lodgers (workmen). Jørgen Frederiksen, a manufacturer, resided in the garret with one maid. Hans Georg Raaschou, a wine merchant, resided in the other second floor apartment with his wife Vilhelmine Raaschou, his brother Diderik August Raaschou (law student) and one maid. Frantz Christian Jensen resided in the basement to the left with his daughter Louise Regine Marie Jensen and son Michael Julius Jensen.

The illustrator Peter Christian Klæstrup (1820-1882) resided in one of the second floor apartments from 1869.

=== Later history ===
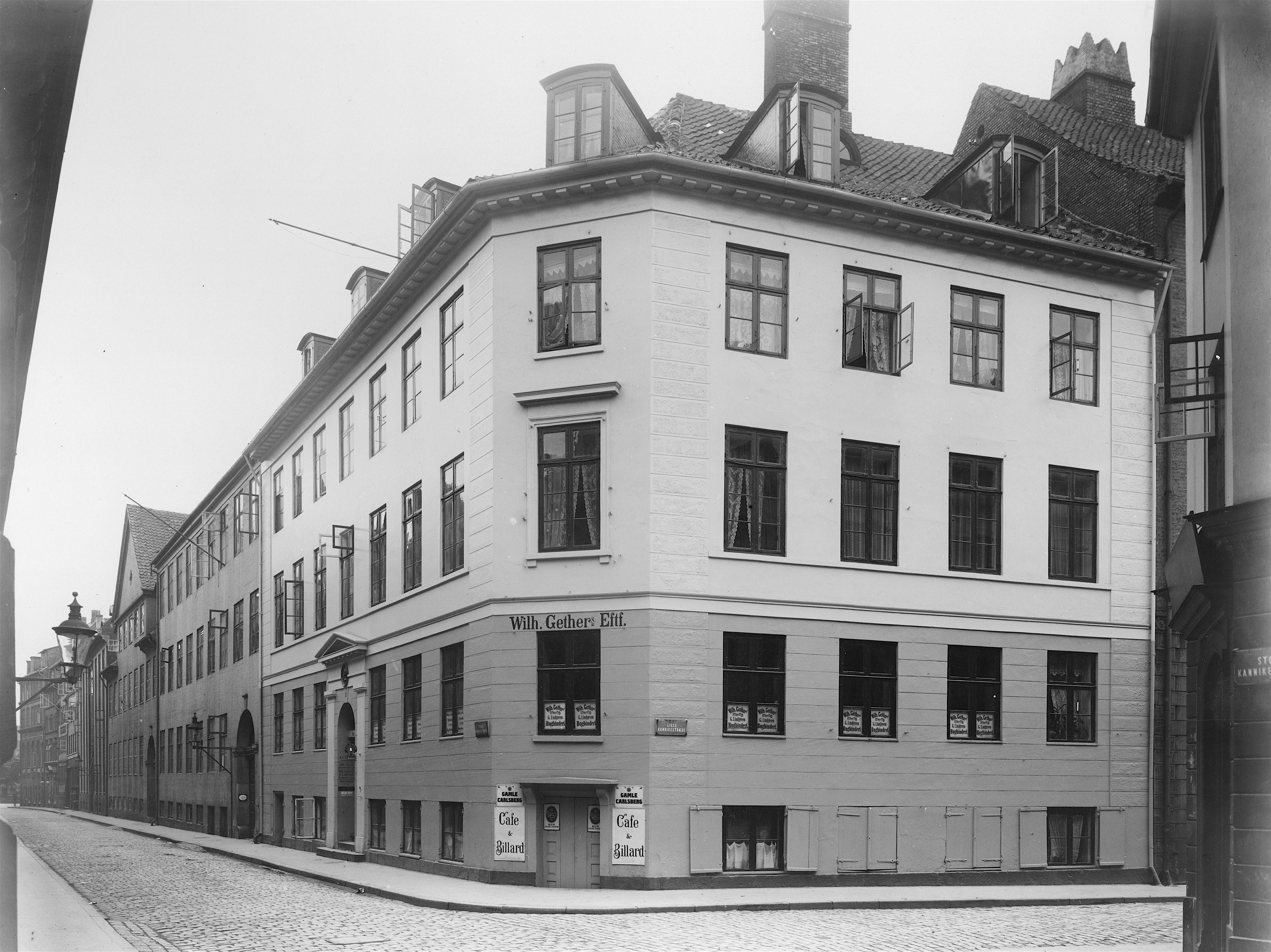
Vintage photo

The restaurant on the ground floor was in the early 1930s operated under the name Peter Fabers Minde. Its name was in around 1940 changed to Det Lille Apotek.

== Architecture ==
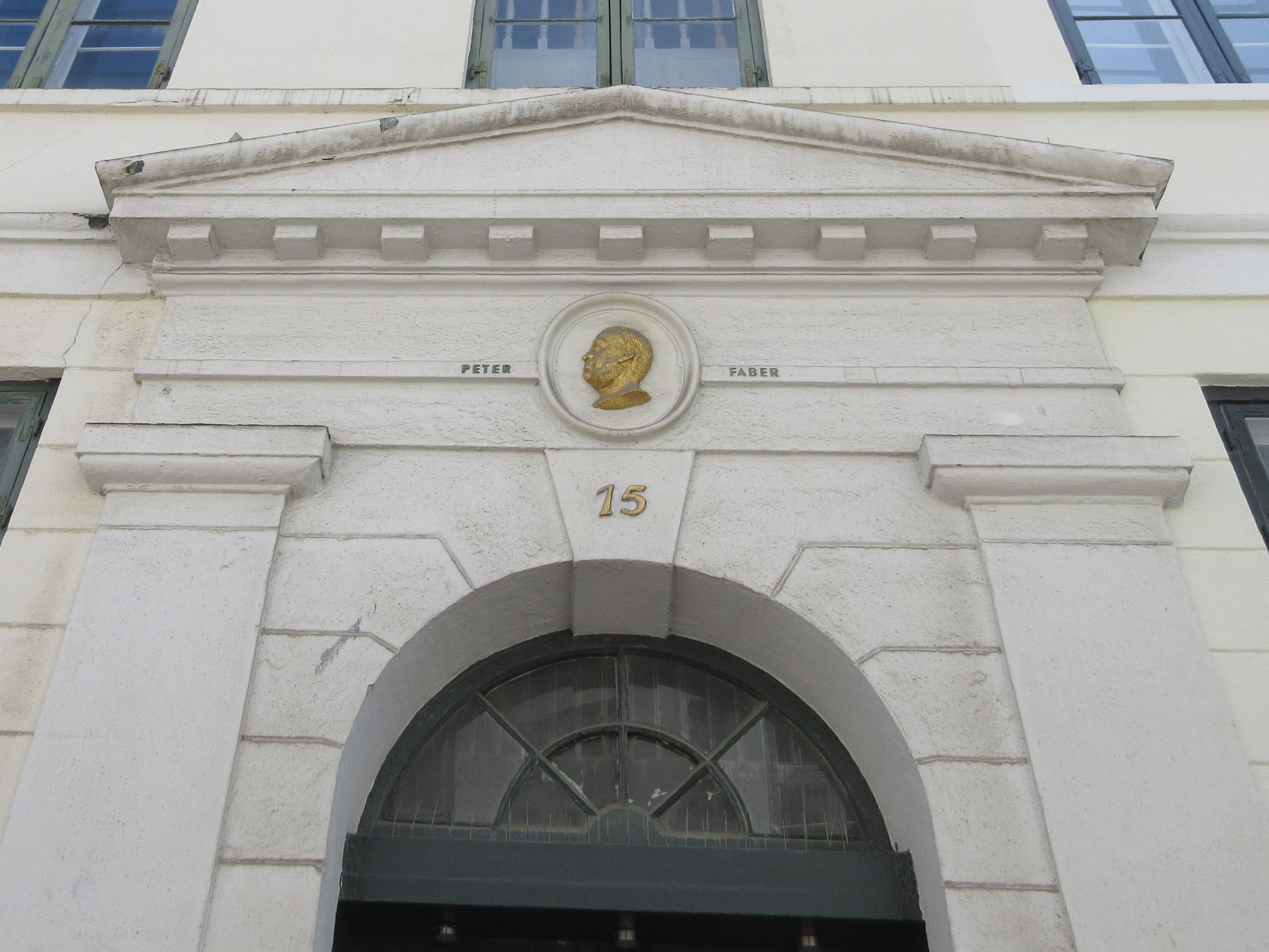
Detail of the facade

The building is constructed with three storeys over a walk-out basement. It has a seven-bays-long facade towards Store Kannikestræde, a four-bays-long facade towards Lille Kannikestræde and a chamfered corner. The plastered, white-painted facade features a belt course above the ground floor, wide corner lesenes and a modillioned cornice. It is finished with shadow joints on the ground floor and on the lesenes in the full height of the building. The arched main entrance in Store Kannikestræde is accented with a Neoclassical portal, with pilasters and a dentillated triangular pediment. The architrave features a gilded relief portrait of Peter Faber en profile, flanked by his first and last name in gilded lettering. The pitched, red tile roof features a number of dormer windows towards both streets. The roof ridge is pierced by three chimneys, one of them at the fire wall towards Store Kannikestræde 13.

== Today ==
The building is today owned by E/F Store Kannikestræde 15. Det Lille Apotek, a traditional Danish restaurant, has existed since at least 1940. The building contains a five-room apartment to the right and a three-room apartment to the left on each of the upper floors.
