= Anne Marie Mangor =

Danish cookbook writer

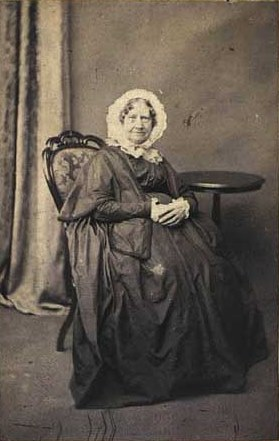
Anne Marie Mangor

Anne Marie Mangor née Bang, also known as Madam Mangor, (1781–1865) was an early Danish cookbook writer. In 1837, she published anonymously her Kogebog for smaa Huusholdninger, the first of several cookbooks she wrote for small households, young girls and soldiers in the field.

== Biography ==
Born on 12 June 1781 in Copenhagen, Mangor was the daughter of the assessor Andreas Bang (1740–1801) and Anna Sybille Terkelsen (1746–1822). Brought up in a comfortable milieu, she had no formal education but acquired a knowledge of language, literature and music. At 19, she married Valentin Nicolai Mangor, a young lawyer and businessman from Viborg. When her husband died in 1812, she was left to bring up three young girls.

She earned her living from craftsmanship, becoming especially competent in weaving carpets. She also practised cookery for her affluent friends and relatives, when they held large parties in the summer. She collected and recorded her own recipes as well as those she experienced elsewhere, carefully specifying quantities of the ingredients and cooking times. By 1837, she had sufficient material to publish a cookbook. She submitted her manuscript to the publisher C.A. Reitzel but after he turned it down she published 500 copies herself, obtaining assistance from her son-in-law's brother who was a printer. Titled Kogebog for smaa Huusholdninger (Cookbook for Small Households), the original edition contained no reference to the author. Thanks to its popularity, further editions followed, published under author's name. She went on to publish Syltebog for smaa Huusholdninger (Jam Making Book for Small Households, 1840) and Fortsættelse af Kogebog for smaa Huusholdninger (Continuation of Cookbook for Small Households, 1842). All these were frequently republished with corrections and additions by the author.

Later works include En Bedstemoders Fortællinger for sine Børnebørn (A Grandmother's Tales for her Grandchildren, 1843), Kogebog for smaa Piger (Cookbook for Young Girls, 1848), a novel titled Tante Cousine (1852) and Kogebog for Soldaten i Felten (Cookbook for Soldiers in the Field, 1864), donating thousands of copies to the army as a token of her patriotism.

Madam Mangor's Cookbook, as it became known, continued to be published by her heirs after her death, with appropriate revisions. The 40th and last edition was published in 1910. The work's popularity was a result of its inclusion of reliably presented recipes for the common dishes of the day, updated in later editions to reflect changes in cooking developments from the open fire to the oven. The relatively short cookbook was also reasonably priced, allowing housewives and housekeepers to purchase a copy.

Anne Marie Mangor died in Copenhagen on 16 May 1865 and is buried in Assistens Cemetery.
