= Houllier =

Houllier may refer to:

- François Houllier (born 1959), the President of Institut National de la Recherche Agronomique, a French public research institution
- Gérard Houllier (1947–2020), a French football manager
- Guy Houllier, a member of the Guadeloupean cadence band Experience 7
