= Store Kongensgade 23 =

Neoclassical mixed-use building in Store Kongensgade in Copenhagen, Denmark

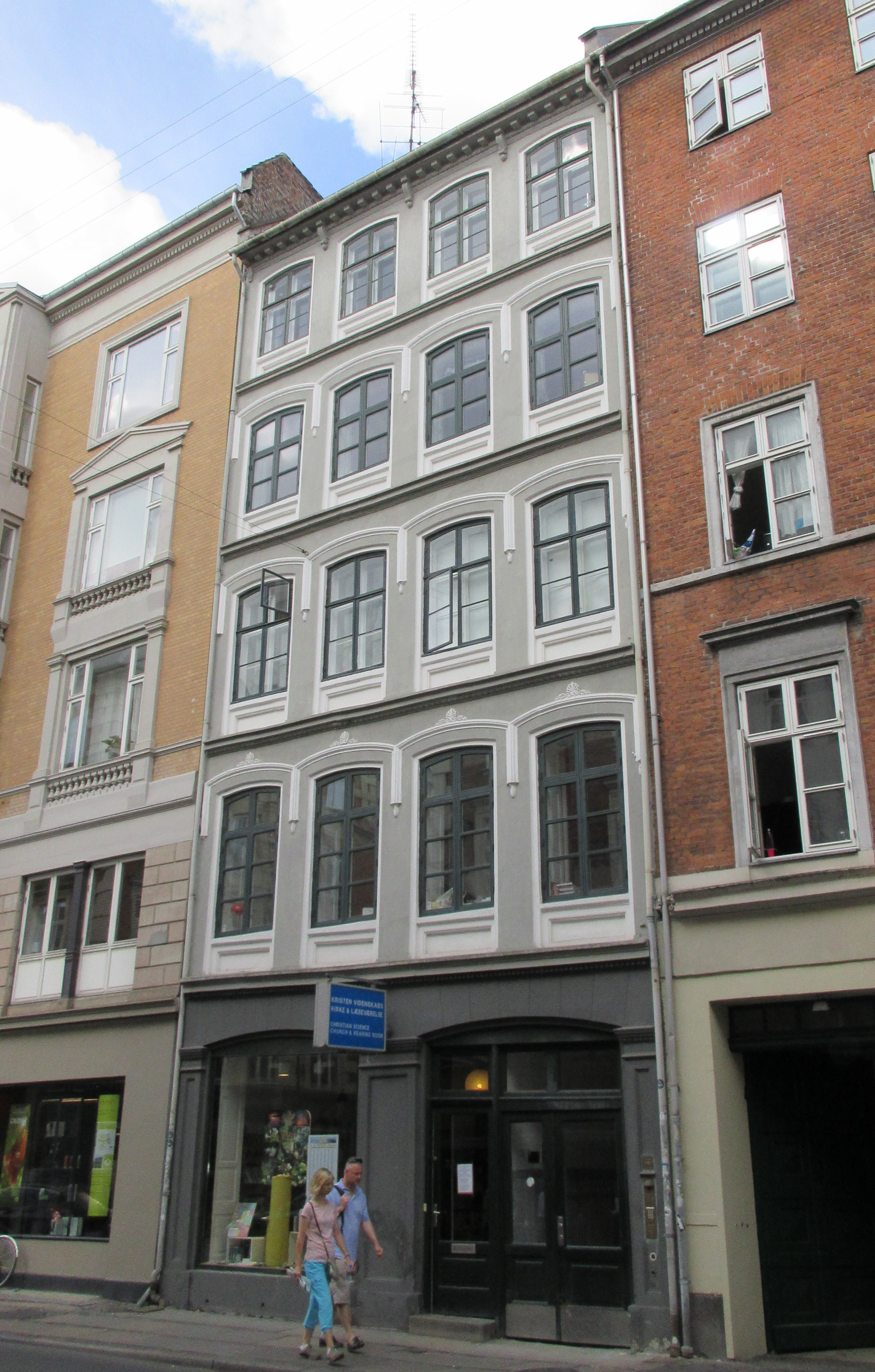
- Store Kongensgade 23 from 1851
- Interactive map of the Store Kongensgade 23 area

General information
- Architectural style: Neoclassical
- Location: Copenhagen, Denmark
- Coordinates: 55°40′57.04″N 12°35′9.64″E
- Completed: 1851 (No. 23A), 1887 (No. 23B)

Store Kongensgade 23 is a Neoclassical mixed-use building situated in Store Kongensgade in Copenhagen, Denmark. The building fronting the street was constructed by master mason Christian Olsen Aagaard in 1850. Aagaard had already constructed the adjacent building at No. 25 in 1837, whose ground floor hosted the Royal Court Pharmacy from 1850 until 1971. The two buildings share a courtyard on their rear. At the far end of the courtyard is a former silver factory constructed in 1887 by Bernhard Hertz according to his own design (Store Kongensgade 23 B). The factory was decommissioned in 1942 and was later used as office space prior to being converted into apartments in 2018. Store Kongensgade 23 and the former silver factory were listed in the Danish registry of protected buildings and places in 1989. No. 25 is not listed.

== History ==
=== Site history, 1689–1837 ===
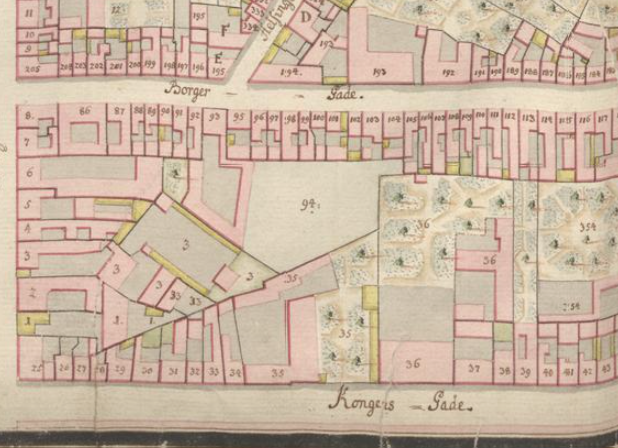
No. 35 seen in a detail from Christian Gedde's map of St. Ann's West Quarter, 1757

The property is located in the area known as New Copenhagen, which was not incorporated into the fortified city until the 1670s. The site was initially part of a larger property. It was by 1689 as No. 145 in St. Ann's West Quarter (Sankt Annæ Vester Kvarter) owned by court president (hofpræsident) Niels Simonsen. In the new cadastre of 1756, the property was listed as No. 35. It was owned by the Italian opera singer Pietro Mingotti at that time. He died on 28 April 1758 in Copenhagen.

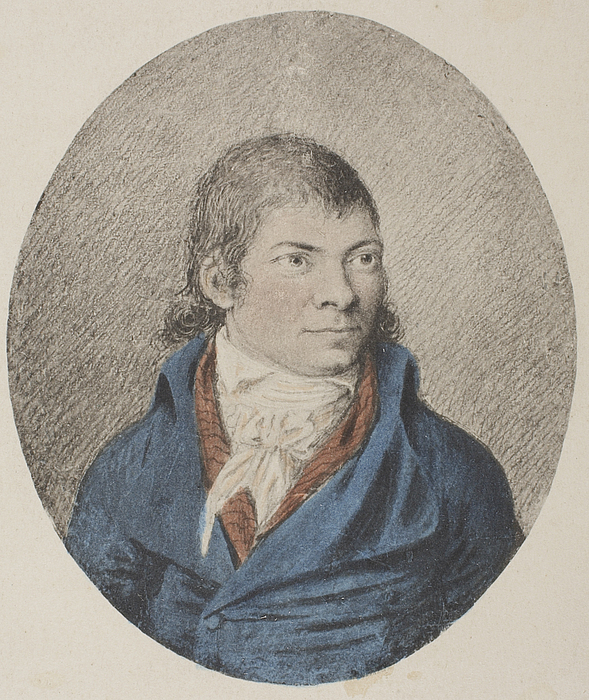
Johan West

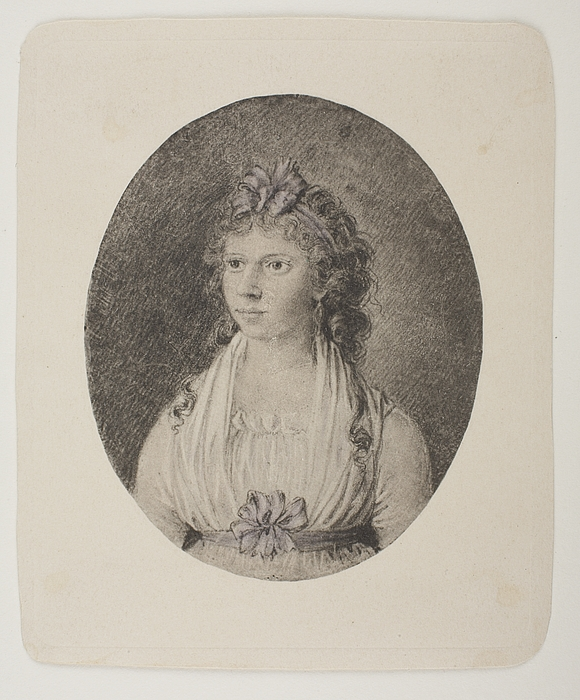
Maren Schou West

After the property had been divided into two smaller properties, the site was part of No. 35 B. In the new cadastre of 1806, the old No. 35 B was listed as No. 40. It was by then owned by master mason Johan Christian West (1769–1816). Back in 1801, West and his family had already been among the many residents of the old No. 35. It is not clear exactly when No. 35 was divided into smaller properties, nor when exactly West purchased No. 35B. At the time of the 1801 census, Johan Christian West resided at No. 35 with his wife Maren Schou Grønlund, their two children (aged one and three), the clerk Mathias J. Møller, the housekeeper (husjomfru) Caroline Frederikke Døllner, a maid and a caretaker.

Johan Christian West and Maren Schou Grønlund (1779–1853) were married in 1796. Maren was the daughter of underfoged Anders Grønlund in Hof- og Stadsretten and Birgitte Grønlund (née Aistrup). Her father had supported Bertel Thorvaldsen's family economically. Johan Christian West's brother was a close friend of Bertel Thorvaldsen before Thorvaldsen moved to Rome. Thorvaldsen created two drawings of Johan and Maren West. They are now in the collection of the Thorvaldsen Museum. The sister Marie Magrethe Hilker (née West) was the mother of artist Georg Hilker.

=== Christian Olsen Aagaard and his two buildings ===
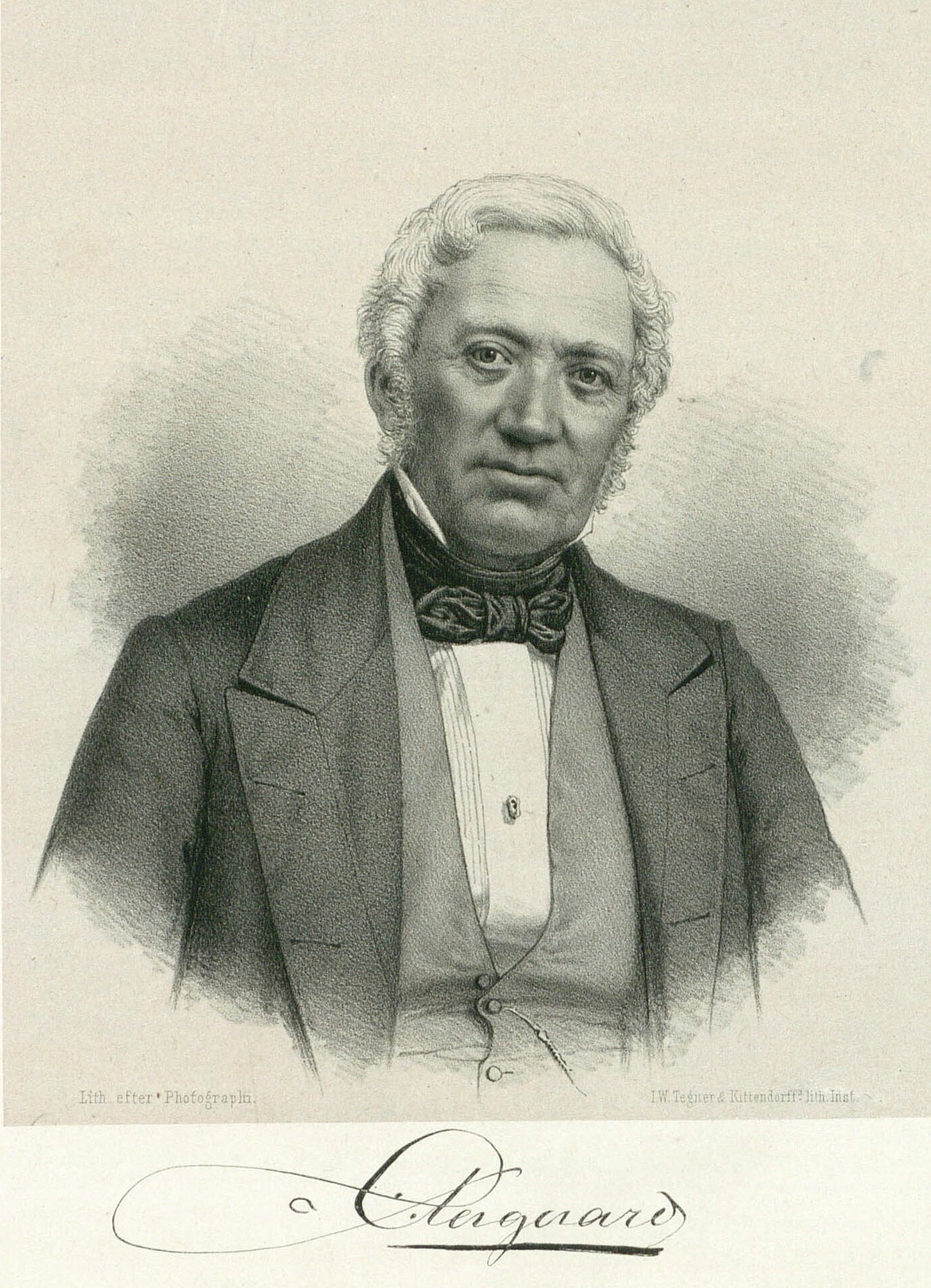
Christian Olsen Aagaard

In 1837, No. 40. was formally divided into two properties (No. 40 A and No. 40 B). A new, four-storey building was completed the same year on the northern side of the two lots (No. 40B, now Store Kongensgade 25) by master mason Christian Olsen Aagaard. Aagaard (1790–1858) was married to Elisabeth Zartine Marie Grundtvig (1801–1881), daughter of Johan Wilhelm Grundtvig (1771–1828) and Mette Laurentia Adolph (1771–1847).

At the time of the 1845 census, Christian and Elisabeth Aagaard resided on the second floor of Aagaard's new building. They lived there with their eight children (aged five to 24), a male servant and a maid. Aagaard's tenants on the other floors belonged to the upper middle-class. Henrikke Thomine Hagen (Svendsen. c. 1794–1880), the widow of merchant (grosserer) Peter Christian Hagen (c. 1789–1833), resided on the ground floor with her five children (aged 11 to 19). Their son Christian August Hagen (1828–1902) would later marry the ballet dancer and actress Amalie Hagen (née Price). Ulrikke Saxtorph (née Hansen), the widow of the physician Johan Sylvester Saxtorph, resided on the first floor with her children Anna and Mathias Saxtorph (twins, aged 22), her sister Mathilde Mynster, a male servant and two maids. Mathias Saxtorph, then a student of medicine, would later become a professor of surgery at the University of Copenhagen. Erik Svitzer, a chief physician and professor of medicine, resided on the third floor with his wife Jane née Batt, his 18-year-old niece Conradine Svitzer, a male servant and two maids. Jacob Ludvig Garrigue, a former royal consul general, resided on the fourth floor with his wife Cecilie Olivia (née Duntzfelt), their two children (aged 14 and 26), lodgers Anna Hansen (aged 23) and Frederik Michael Hertz (aged 20) and two maids. The low, 18th-century building at No. 40 A was still home to just two households, and its residents belonged to a lower social class than that of their neighbours at No. 40 B. Hans Caspersen, a greengrocer, resided on the ground floor with his wife Anne Chrestine Walgreen, their two children (aged 15 and 18) and one maid. Carl Christian Holm, a master saddler, resided on the first floor with his wife Florentine Augustine, the wife's eight-year-old nephew Vigo Otte Bentzen and a 24-year-old caretaker. A master joiner and a master painter resided on the first floor of the rear wing with their families and employees (12 people).

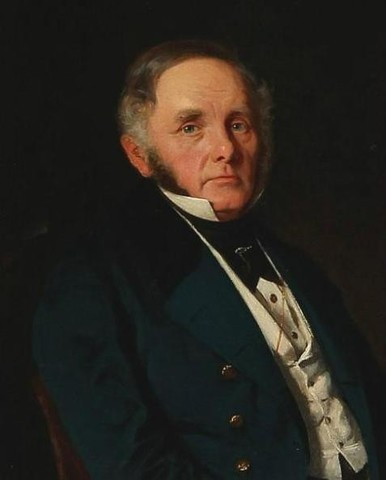
Erik Switzer

By 1850, Christian and Elisabeth Aagaard had moved to the first floor of No. 40B. They lived there with five of their children (aged 10 to 26), one male servant, two maids and one lodger. The lodger was the 21-year-old pianist Julius Andreas Møller. Mathilde Kofod, a 72-year-old widow, resided on the ground floor with her 37-year-old niece Eveline Larsen, a male servant and a maid. Elisa Frederica Tutein (1807–1982), the widow of Carl Diderich Tutein (1785–1847) and a great-granddaughter of Friederich Tutein, resided on the second floor with her two children (aged 23 and 34), the lady's companion Augusta Synnested, a male servant and two maids. The Svitzer family was still residing in the apartment on the third floor.

At the time of the 1850 census, the low building at No. 40A had still not been demolished. Rasmus West, a houllier, resided on the ground floor with his wife Abel Christine West and five grown children (aged 30 to 33). Andreas Klugman, a master joiner, resided on the first floor with his wife Marie Klugman, their seven-year-old foster daughter Andrea Emma Freitag, and two apprentices (aged 18 and 19).

From 1850, the Royal Court Pharmacy was based out of the ground floor of Aagaard's building at No. 40 B. Ub 1850. Aagaard also started the construction of a new building at No. 40A. It was completed in 1851.

=== 1860 census ===
The property was home to 15 ehouseholds at the 1860 census. Elisabeth Aagaard resided in the building with three of her children, a housekeeper, a maid and the lodger Carl Peter Grindlig Hansen. Hans Christian Sommerfeldt, a military physician, resided in the building with his wife Albertine Charlotte Sommerfeldt, their three sons (aged 13 to 17) and two maids. Anton Frederik Pedersen, manager of Sømændenes Mønstring (with title of kancelliråd), resided in the building with his wife Louise Elisabeth Petersen, two of their children (aged 25 and 30) and one maid. Frederik Sinstow, a chamberlain, resided in the building with his daughter Catarine Elisabeth Sinstow and two maids. Peter August Flor, a pastry baker (konditor), resided in the building with his wife Caroline Mathilde Severine Flor, their two children (aged nine and 10), husjomfru Petrea Mathilde Hellebroe, a nanny, a maid, a pastry baker (employee), an apprentice and a caretaker. Vilhelm Jørgensen, a brick-layer, resided in the building with his wife Lovise Marie Axel. Julius Theodor Krøncke, a master mason, resided in the building with his wife Regine Charlotte Amalie, their three daughters (aged one to three) and one maid. Catharine Thaning, a widow, resided in the building with her son Vilhelm Thaning and one maid. Thomas Hermann Kall, a chief accountant (revisionschef) for the Royal Danish Mail, resided in the building with his wife Johanne Cathrine Amalie Kall and their six-year-old daughter. Jørgen Otte Mørk, a wine merchant, resided in the building with his wife Johanne Caroline Mørk and two daughters (aged 17 and 32). Theodor Johan Aagaard, a legal assistant in the Ministry of Interior Affairs, resided in the building with his wife Anna Wilhelmine Aagaard (née Richter), a maid and a lodger (law student). Johan Constantin Berner, a widow, resided in the building with her daughter Henriette Pauline Berner and a maid. Birthe Nielsen, an unmarried woman, resided in the building with the widow Græser Wahlgreen (needlework). Johanne Bolette Weigaard, Otine Elenora Christine Weigaard and Ane Nicoline Ravnholdt—three women employed with needlework—resided in the building.

=== Bernhard Hertz' Silver Factory ===
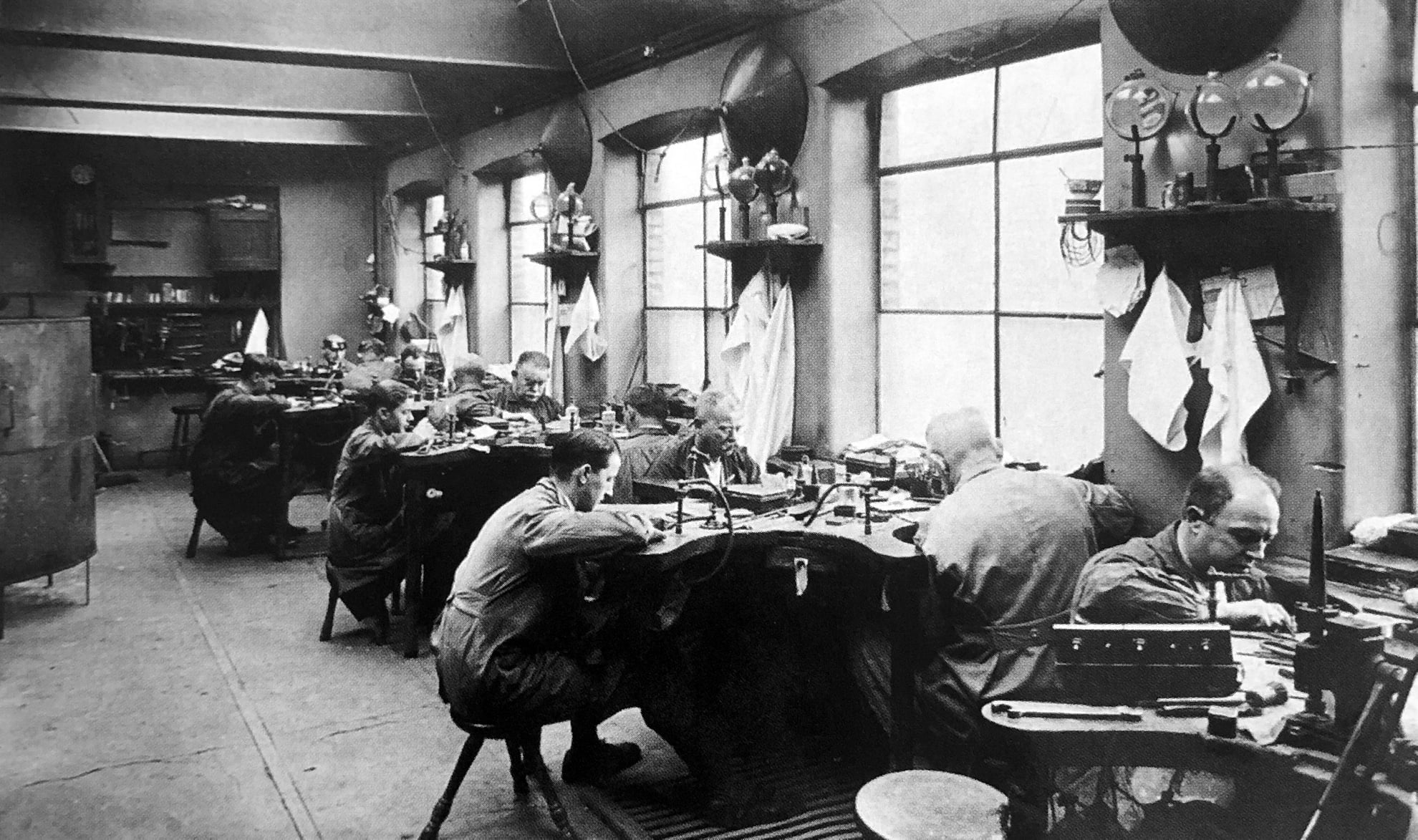
The factory in 1932

Bernhard Hertz completed his training as a goldsmith in 1858. His graduation piece, an arm ring, was acquired by Frederick VII for 300 Danish rigsdaler and presented to Countess Danner. Hertz used the money from the sale to set up his own business the same year. He specialized in modern jewellery with flower motifs and replicas of ancient jewellery. At the time of the 1880 census, Bernhard Hertz resided at Store Kongensgade 27. To make his jewellery accessible to a wider customer base, he had begun to produce it in silver instead of gold, and introduced machinery to the production process for rolling and frosting. In 1887, he constructed a three-storey factory building in a courtyard in Store Kongensgade.

After his death in 1909, the factory continued to operate until 1942. It was later used as office space. The tenants included a law firm.

== Architecture ==
Store Kongensgade 23 is five storeys tall and just four bays wide. The facade is plastered and painted in a pale grey colour with white details. It is finished with belt courses between all the storeys and a dentillted cornice. The windows are placed in flat-arched niches. The ground floor features a wide gateway and one large display window. The roof is clad with red tile. The main entrance is located inside the south wall of the gateway.

A seven-bay-long side wing extends from the rear side of the building. The two wings are joined together by an outwardly curved corner bay. The side wing is topped by a red tiled Mansard roof. The facade is rendered in a yellow colour.

The factory building is constructed with three storeys above a walk-out basement.

== Today ==
In 2018, Ceraco a/s, assisted by Gaihede, converted the former silver factory into eight apartments.

== Cultural references ==
In Store Kongensgade 23, a long essay published by Søren Ulrik Thomsen in 2021, he writes about an apartment in the building where he only lived for around a year as an adolescent but which still came to play a formative role in his life.

== See also ==
- Brøndumgård
