= List of historic houses in Denmark =

This is a list of historic houses in Denmark.

== Zealand ==
=== Faxe Municipality ===
Name	Image	Location	Date	Coordinates	Notes	Ref
Bregentved			1891			Ref
Gisselfeld						Ref
Jomfruens Egede			1579			Ref
Juellinge			1675			Ref
Lystrup Manor						Ref
Rosendal			1849			Ref
Strandegård						
Turebyholm			1640			Ref
Vemmetofte			1721			

=== Holbæk Municipality ===
Name	Image	Location	Date	Coordinates	Notes	Ref
Aggersvold						
Bonderup						
Dønnerup						
Eriksholm Castle			1788			Ref
Gislingegård			1763			Ref
Hagestedgaard						
Hørbygaard						Ref
Knabstrup Manor			1862			Ref
Kongsdal			1598			Ref
Løvenborg			1630s			Ref
Merløsegaard			1630s			
Tølløse Castle		Tølløse				
Torbenfeldt Castle			1577			Ref
Vognserup			1560s			Ref

=== Kalundborg Municipality ===
Name	Image	Location	Date	Coordinates	Notes	Ref
Aagaard		Kalundborg				Ref
Bispegården		Kalundborg				Ref
Kattrup		Kalundborg				
Kragerup			1802			Ref
Lerchenborg			1743			Ref
Lindegården						Ref
Lødegård						

=== Lejre Municipality ===
Name	Image	Location	Date	Coordinates	Notes	Ref
Egholm			1824			Ref
Ledreborg		Lejre	1746			Ref

=== Næstved Municipality ===
Name	Image	Location	Date	Coordinates	Notes	Ref
Fuirendal			1609			Ref
Gavnø Castle		Gavnø				Ref
Gunderslevholm			1729			
Herlufsholm		Næstved				
Holmegård			1635			Ref
Rønnebæksholm			1734			
Saltø						Ref
Tybjerggård			1763			Ref

=== Odsherred Municipality ===
Name	Image	Location	Date	Coordinates	Notes	Ref
Dragsholm Castle						Ref
Klintegården			1916		House designed by Peder Vilhelm Jensen-Klint	Ref
Korshagenhus		Rørvig	1960		The architect Erik Korshagen's own summer house	Ref
Malergården					Former home and studio of Sigurd Svane, now a historic house museum	Ref
The Round House			1956		Arne Jacobsen-designed house	Ref

=== Ringsted Municipality ===
Name	Image	Location	Date	Coordinates	Notes	Ref
Giesegaard						
Skjoldenæsholm Castle			1766			Ref
Sørup						

=== Slagelse Municipality ===
Name	Image	Location	Date	Coordinates	Notes	Ref
Borreby Castle			1556			Ref
Espe			1775			Ref
Falkensteen			1775			Ref
Gyldenholm Manor			1864			Ref
Holsteinborg Castle			1596			Ref
Snedinge			1663			Ref
Tårnborg			1803			Ref
Tårnholm			1798			Ref
Valbygård			1855			Ref

=== Sorø Municipality ===
Name	Image	Location	Date	Coordinates	Notes	Ref
Ingemann House		Sorø	1745			Ref
Molbech House		Sorø	1766			Ref
Tersløsegaard						Ref
Vedbygård		Ruds Vedby	1743			

=== Stevns Municipality ===
Name	Image	Location	Date	Coordinates	Notes	Ref
Gjorslev			1588			Ref
Juellinge		Manor house	1675			Ref
Vallø Castle						Ref

=== Vordingborg Municipality ===
Name	Image	Location	Date	Coordinates	Notes	Ref
Beldringe			1561			Ref
Christinelund			1860			Ref
Klintholm		Møn	1838			
Lilliendal						
Liselund		Møn				
Liselund Ny Slot		Møn	1887			Ref
Marienlyst Manor			1874			Ref
Nordfeld			1874			Ref
Nysø Manor		Præstø	1673			Ref
Rosenfeldt Manor		Vordingborg	1870			Ref

== Bornholm ==
Name	Image	Location	Date	Coordinates	Notes	Ref
Erichsens Gård		Rønne	1806	55°06′13″N 14°41′52″E	Commoners house, now part of Bornholm museum	
Oluf Høst House		Gudhjem	1929	55°12′47″N 14°57′59″E	Former home of the painter Oluf Høst, now a museum dedicated to his works	

== Lolland-Falster ==
=== Guldborgsund Municipality ===
Name	Image	Type	Date	Coordinates	Notes	Ref
Aalholm		Manor house	1918			
Corselitze		Manor house	1777	54°46′03″N 12°01′15″E	Neoclassical residence built by Johan Frederik Classen and designed by Andreas Kirkerup with an English landscape garden	Ref
Engestofte		Manor house	1807	54°45′45″N 11°33′44″E	Two-storey Neoclassical manor on a Crown estate first recorded in the 13th century. Extended in 1889.	Ref
Czarens Hus		Town house	1690s	54°46′05″N 11°52′01″E	Half-timbered building, visited by Peter the Great in 1716. Now a museum.	Ref
Fuglsang Manor		Manor house	1869	54°43′19″N 11°47′52″E	Manor in the Historicist style designed by J.G. Zinn. Now a cultural centre on an agricultural estate.	
Gammel Kirstineberg		Manor house	1773	54°47′44″N 11°52′08″E	Neoclassical manor on an estate now used as a garden centre	Ref
Gjedsergaard		Manor house	1767	54°38′53″N 11°52′56″E	Located on the southern tip of Falster on an estate of 1,173 ha, the house was renovated in 1872	Ref
Krenkerup		Manor house	1490	54°46′37″N 11°40′13″E	The original stone building was extended for Mogens Gøye in 1510 with further extensions and rebuilding until 1780. It stands an estate of 3,700 ha, one of the largest in Denmark.	
Ny Kirstineberg			1867			Ref
Næsgård			1799			Ref
Orebygaard						
Orupgaard		Manor house	1773			
Pandebjerg						Ref
Valnæsgaard						Ref
Vennerslund		Farmhouse	1790			Ref
Westensborg						Ref

=== Lolland Municipality ===
Name	Image	Type	Date	Coordinates	Notes	Ref
Ålstrup		Manor house	c.1800			Ref
Bramsløkke		Manor house	1700			
Christianssæde		Manor house	1760			Ref
Frederiksdal		Manorhouse	1756			Ref
Fredsholm		Manor house	1918			
Højbygård			1761			Ref
Kjærstrup		Manor house	1765			Ref
Knuthenborg		Manor house	1866			
Knuthenlund		Country house				
Lungholm		Manor house	1856			Ref
Pederstrup		Manor house	1822			Ref
Qvade House		Town house	1800			Ref
Rudbjerggaard		Manor house	1797			Ref
Sæbyholm		Manor house	1856			Ref
Søholt		Manor house	1804			
Vindeholme		Manor house	1585			

== Funen and South Funen Archipelago ==
=== Assens Municipality ===
Name	Image	Location	Date	Coordinates	Notes	Ref
Billeskov			1796			Ref
Damsbo			1656			Ref
Brahesborg			1656			Ref
Erholm			1854			Ref
Flenstofte			1748			Ref
Hagenskov			1776			Ref
Krengerup			1721			
Løgismose						Ref
Søbo		Manor house	1720s			Ref

=== Faaborg-Midtfyn Municipality ===
Name	Image	Location	Date	Coordinates	Notes	Ref
Arreskov			1573			Ref
Brahetrolleborg						Ref
Bramstrup			1598			Ref
Brobygård			1673			Ref
Egeskov Castle			1554			Ref
Hellerup			167+			Ref
Holstenshuus			1643			Ref
Hvedholm Castle						Ref
Krumstrup			1560s			Ref
Lundegård						Ref
Nakkebølle			1559			Ref
Østrupgård						Ref
Sandholt						Ref

=== Kerteminde Municipality ===
Name	Image	Location	Date	Coordinates	Notes	Ref
Bøgebjerg			1845			Ref
Hverringe			1780s			Ref
Klarskov			1793			Ref
Lundsgård			1765			Ref
Rønninge Søgård			1506			Ref
Scheelenborg			1843			Ref
Skovsbo Castle			1570s			Ref
Ulriksholm						Ref

=== Langeland Municipality ===
Name	Image	Location	Date	Coordinates	Notes	Ref
Tranekær Castle		Manor house				Ref

=== Middelfart Municipality ===
Name	Image	Location	Date	Coordinates	Notes	Ref
Hindsgavl		Middelfart	c. 1500			Ref
Wedellsborg			1784			Ref

=== Nordfyn Municipality ===
Name	Image	Location	Date	Coordinates	Notes	Ref
Dallund						Ref
Gyldensten			1640			Ref
Hofmansgave			1780s			Ref
Margård			1745			Ref
Sandagergård						Ref

=== Nyborg Municipality ===
Name	Image	Location	Date	Coordinates	Notes	Ref
Glorup Manor			1765			Ref
Hindemae			c. 1790			Ref
Holckenhavn Castle			1484			Ref
Juelsberg			1771			Ref
Juulskov			1599			Ref
Lykkesholm			c. 1600			Ref
Nyborg Castle		Nyborg				Ref
Ravnholt			c. 1620			Ref
Risinge			1750			Ref
Rygård						Ref
Ørbæklunde			c. 1450			Ref

=== Odense Municipality ===
Name	Image	Location	Date	Coordinates	Notes	Ref
Dalum			1800			Ref
Fraugdegård			c. 1588			Ref
Hans Christian Andersen's Birthplace						Ref
Hollufgård			1577			Ref
Lindved			17th century			Ref
Odens Palace			c. 1720			Ref
Sanderumgård						Ref

=== Svendborg Municipality ===
Name	Image	Location	Date	Coordinates	Notes	Ref
Anne Hvides Gård		Svendborg	1560	55°03′36″N 10°36′33″E	Well-preserved, half-timbered Renaissance residence, now a museum	
Broholm			1642			Ref
Flintholm			1844			Ref
Hesselagergård			1538			Ref
Hvidkilde Castle			16th century			Ref
Valdemars Castle		Tåsinge	1643			Ref

== South Jutland ==
=== Aabenraa Municipality ===
Name	Image	Location	Date	Coordinates	Notes	Ref
Brundlund Castle						Ref
Søgård		Gram	c. 1670			Ref

=== Haderslev Municipality ===
Name	Image	Location	Date	Coordinates	Notes	Ref
Gram Castle		Gram	c. 1670			Ref
Haderslevhus		Haderslev				

=== Kolding Municipality ===
Name	Image	Location	Date	Coordinates	Notes	Ref
Koldinghus		Kolding	1440			Ref

=== Sønderborg Municipality ===
Name	Image	location	Date	Coordinates	Notes	Ref
Augustenborg Palace		Augustenborg	1770s			Ref
Nordborg Castle		Nordborg				
Gråsten Palace		Gråsten				Ref
Sandbjerg Manor			1788			Ref
Sønderborg Castle		Sønderborg				Ref
Ueloow Mansion		Sønderborg	c. 1800			Ref

=== Tønder Municipality ===
Name	Image	Location	Date	Coordinates	Notes	Ref
Schackenborg Castle			1667			Ref

=== Varde Municipality ===
Name	Image	Location	Date	Coordinates	Notes	Ref
Hennegård			1831			Ref

=== Vejle Municipality ===
Name	Image	Location	Date	Coordinates	Notes	Ref	
Engelsholm Castle			1593			Ref	
Tirsbæk			1550			Ref	_

== East Jutland and Samsø ==
=== Aarhus Municipality ===
Name	Image	Location	Date	Coordinates	Notes	Ref
Kærbygård		Aarhus	1770	56°12′39.8″N 10°07′45.9″E	Manor	Ref
Marselisborg		Aarhus	1902	56°07′40.0″N 10°12′09.4″E	Royal summer palace	Ref
Moesgård		Aarhus	1784	56°05′07.2″N 10°13′11.7″E	Manor	Ref
Vilhelmsborg		Aarhus	1902	56°04′00.8″N 10°11′12.5″E	Manor	Ref

=== Favrskov Municipality ===
Name	Image	Location	Date	Coordinates	Notes	Ref
Bidstrup			1760			Ref
Clausholm			1693			Ref
Favrskov Manor			1750			Ref
Frijsenborg		Hammel	1583			Ref
Lyngballegård						
Søbygaard			1693			Ref
Ulstrup Castle			1668			Ref

=== Horsens Municipality ===
Name	Image	Location	Date	Coordinates	Notes	Ref
Boller			1588		Ref	
Bygholm Castle		Horsens	1775		Ref	

=== Norddjurs Municipality ===
Name	Image	Location	Date	Coordinates	Notes	Ref
Estruplund			1863			
Fjellerup Østergård						
Gammel Estrup Manor						Ref
Katholm Castle			1591			Ref
Løvenholm			1576			Ref
Meilgaard			1573			Ref
Sostrup			1606			Ref
Stenalt			1690			Ref

=== Silkeborg Municipality ===
Name	Image	Location	Date	Coordinates	Notes	Ref
Vinderslevholm			c. 1550		Late Gothic manor house	Ref

=== Syddjurs Municipality ===
Name	Image	Location	Date	Coordinates	Notes	Ref
Høegholm			1889			
Kalø Hovedgård						
Møllerup			1681			
Rosenholm Castle		1560s	1582			Ref
Skaføgård			1582			Ref

== Mid-West Jutland and Læsø ==
=== Holstebro Municipality ===
Name	Image	Location	Date	Coordinates	Notes	Ref
Nørre Vosborg		Vemb	1532			

=== Ringkøbing-Skjern Municipality ===
Name	Image	Location	Date	Coordinates	Notes	Ref
Abeline's House			1871		Former wreckmaster's house, now a local historic museum	Ref
Brejninggaard			c. 1580		Former manor house from the 16th century, now a school	Ref

=== Skive Municipality ===
Name	Image	Location	Date	Coordinates	Notes	Ref
Spøttrup Castle			c. 1500			Ref

=== Viborg Municipality ===
Name	Image	Location	Date	Coordinates	Notes	Ref
Hald Manor			1798			Ref
Ormstrup			1624			Ref
Palstrup			1726		Manor house from 1740, rebuilt by Hack Kampmann in 1919	Ref
Tjele Manor			c. 1500			Ref

== North Jutland ==
=== Aalborg Municipality ===
Name	Image	Location	Date	Coordinates	Notes	Ref
Aalborghus		Aalborg	c. 1550			Ref
Jens Bang's House		Aalborg	1624			Ref

=== Brønderslev Municipality ===
Name	Image	Location	Date	Coordinates	Notes	Ref
Dronninglund Castle		Dronninglund	1583			Ref
Hammelmose			1583			Ref
Voergaard Castle			1588			Ref

=== Frederikshavn Municipality ===
Name	Image	Location	Date	Coordinates	Notes	Ref
Drachmann's House		Skagen	1829			
Klitgården		Skagen				
Michael and Anna Ancher House		Skagen				Ref
Knudseje			1710			Ref
Lerbæk		Elling	17th century			Ref
Ormholt		Østervrå	1854			Ref
P. S. Krøyer House		Skagen			Former home of Peder Severin Krøyer	Ref

=== Hjørring Municipality ===
Name	Image	Location	Date	Coordinates	Notes	Ref
Høgholt		Sindal	1650			Ref
Odden Manor		Hjørring				Ref

=== Jammerbugt Municipality ===
Name	Image	Location	Date	Coordinates	Notes	Ref
Bratskov			c. 1550			Ref
Kokkedal			c- 1550			Ref

=== Læsø Municipality ===
Name	Image	Location	Date	Coordinates	Notes	Ref
Museumsgården		Gammel Østerby	1677		Old farmhouse, notable for its seaweed-thatched roof, a Læsø specialty	Ref

=== Rebild Municipality ===
Name	Image	Location	Date	Coordinates	Notes	Ref
Lindenborg Manor			1583			Ref
Nørlund Castle			1597			[ Ref

=== Thisted Municipality ===
Name	Image	Location	Date	Coordinates	Notes	Ref	
Nørregård			1807			Ref	_

=== Vesthimmerland Municipality ===
Name	Image	Location	Date	Coordinates	Notes	Ref
Aggersborggård			c. 1550			Ref
Hessel			c-			Ref
Lerkenfeldt			c. 1555			Ref
