= Fredsholm =

Manor house near Nakskov, Denmark

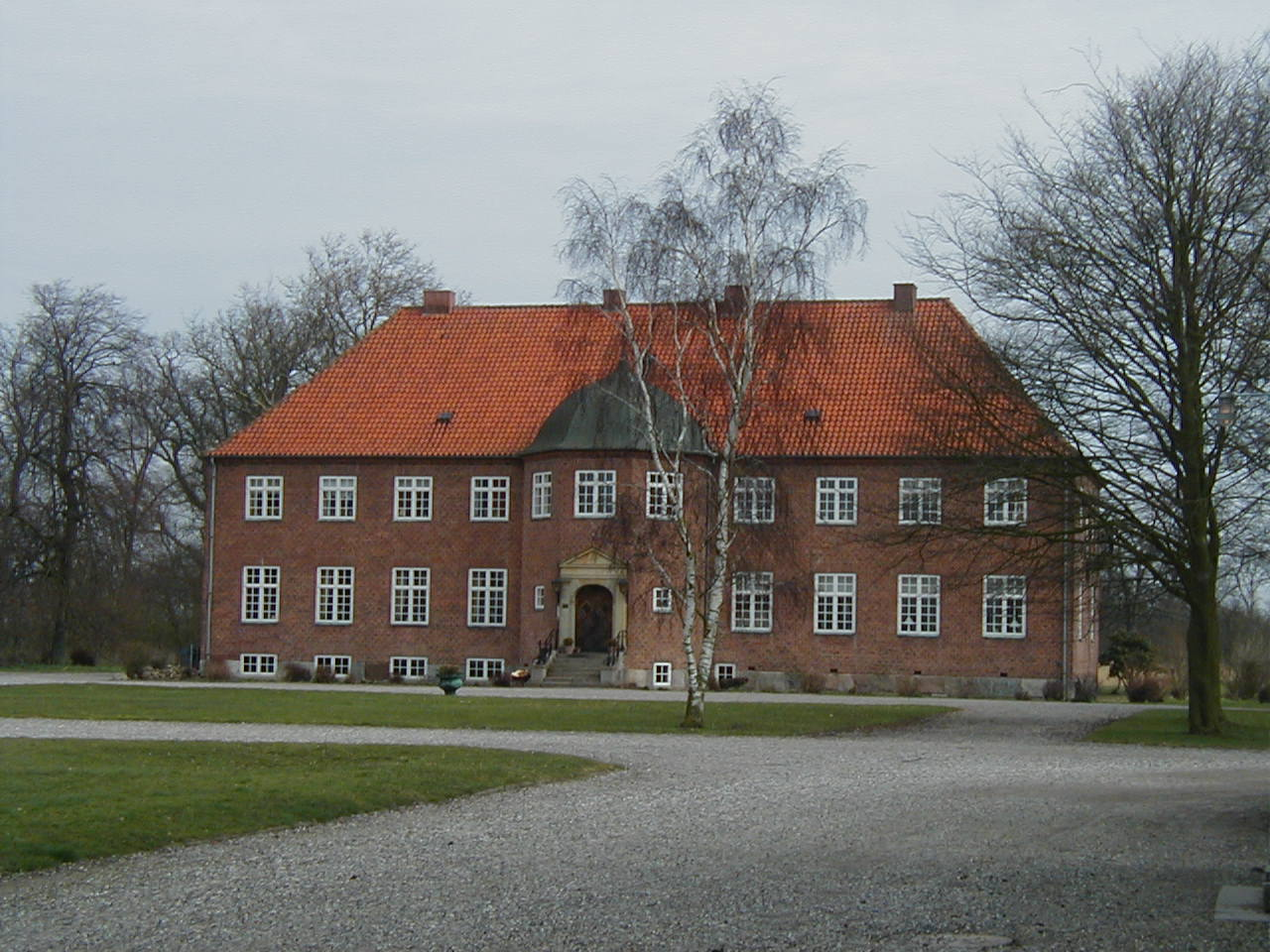

General information
- Location: Fredsholms Allé 15; 4900 Nakskov, Denmark
- Coordinates: 54°48′35″N 11°5′56″E
- Completed: 1918

Fredsholm is a manor house and estate located close to Nakskov on the island of Lolland in southeastern Denmark. Fredsholm and Rudbjerggaard had the same owners in the period 1674–1819.

== History ==
=== 1630–1755: Barnewitz and Bülow families ===
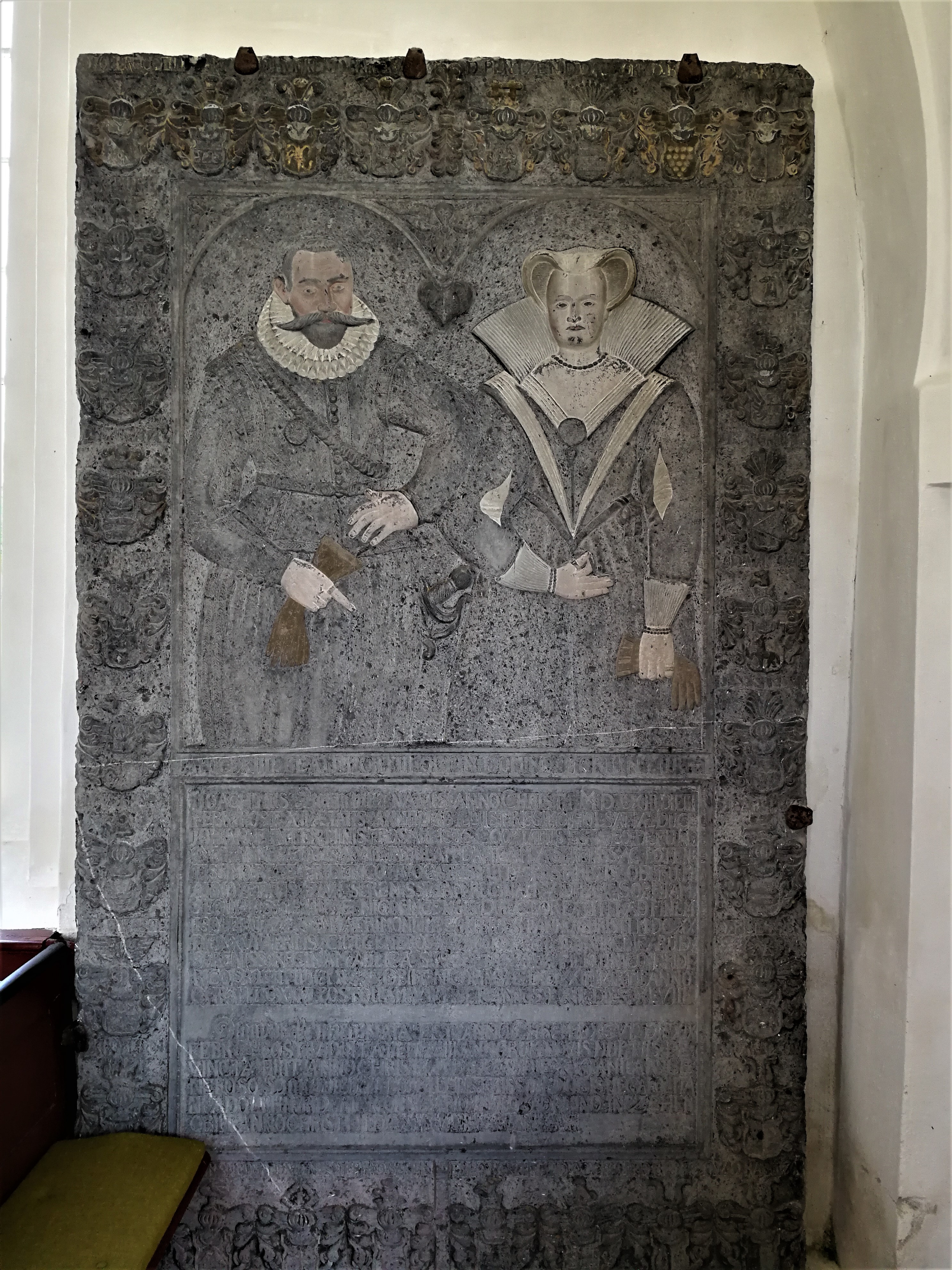
Epitaph to Joachim von Barnewitz and Øllegård Pentz in Tillitse Church

Fredsholm was established as a manor in 1630 by Øllegaard Barnewitz, née Petz, the widow of Joachim Barnewitz. She was already the owner of a number of estates and frequently increased their size through the acquisition of more land. She gave her new estate the name Fritzholm or Friderichsholm after her only child, Friderich von Barnewitz, and over time that name was transformed to Fredsholm.

In circa 1648, Øllegaard Pentz ceded Fredsholm to her son on the condition that she could remain on the estate until her death. Friderich von Barnewitz, one of the wealthiest men of his time, died just 31 years old in 1653. Fredsholm was then passed to his daughter, Øllegaard von Barnewitz. She was married in 1674 to Christian Bülow, who already that same year sold Fredsholm to his brother-in-law, Joachim von Barnewitz, the owner of Rudbjerggaard.

Joachim von Barnewitz died unmarried and without children in 1677. The ownership of Fredsholm and Rudbjerggaard was then divided between his several heirs and the estates had multiple owners until Frederik Barnewitz von Bülow finally acquired full ownership of them in 1723. His son, Caspar Frederik Bülow, sold the estates in 1755.

=== 1755–1805: Knuth family ===
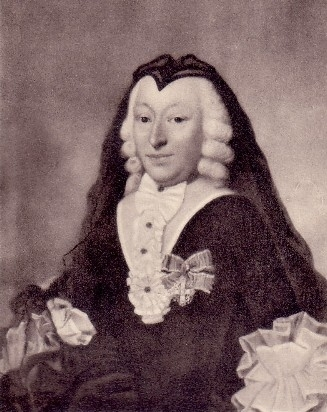
Ida Margrethe Reventlow

The new owner was Ide Margrethe, Countess Knuth (née Reventlow), the widow of Adam Christopher, Count Knuth of Knuthenborg. She ceded it in turn to her youngest son, Conrad Ditlev, Baron Knuth of Conradsborg. He spent much of his time at Fredsholm after his retirement from the Supreme Court and died on the estate in 1805. He was succeeded by his son, Carl Conrad Gustav Knuth, who died in 1819.

=== 19th century ===
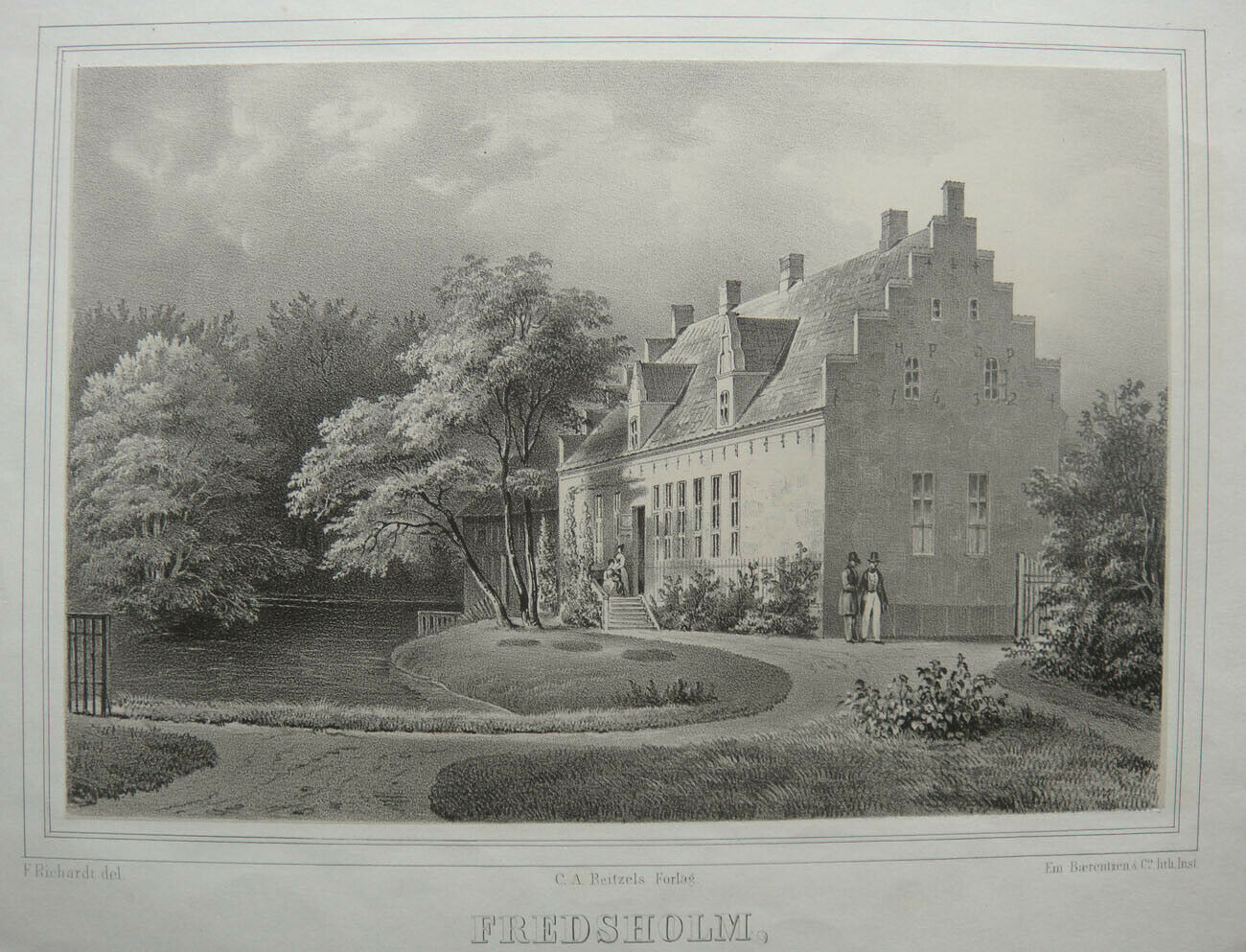
The old building seen on a lithography by Ferdinand Richardt

Fredsholm was then sold to Simon Andersen Dons and Johan Ferdinand de Neergaard, who, later that same year, sold the estate to Søren Henrik Lund- Lund immediately embarked on reclaiming the bay between Vejlø and Fredsholm, and the project was later completed by his son Henrik August Lund. The successful endeavour inspired Henrik August Lund to engage in further reclamation projects, but this resulted in a dispute with the citizens of Nakskov. Lund lost the trial which was appealed all the way to the Supreme Court.

=== 20th century ===
In 1840, Henrik August Lund sold Fredsholm to August Villads Bech. Bech tried to continue the reclamation project but soon relented and sold the estate to Carl Henrik Jacob Jensen in 1847. In 1865, he sold the reclamation right to two brothers named Casse. They managed to reclaim approximately 300 hectares of new land.

Carl Henrik Jacob Jensen struggled with economic difficulties. In 1890, he had to cede Fredsholm to Lollands Spare- og Laanebank. The bank later that same year sold the restate to Frederik Georg Bøttern.

Lars and Peter Rasmussen, two brothers who had already leased Fredsholm for some time, bought the estate in 1908. Lars Rasmussen's descendants owned it until 1991.

== Architecture ==
The current main building was constructed in 1917-1918 from designs by Daniel Rasmussen. It is a simple, two-storey red brick building with a tower-like central projection on the western facade. The building has a half-hipped red tile roof.

== Today ==
Fredsholm is today owned by Fredsholm Gods A/S. The estate covers 501 hectares of land.

== List of owners ==
- (1630-1635) Øllegaard Hartvigsdatter Pentz, married 1) von Barnewitz, 2) von Passow
- (1635-1644) Hartvig von Passow
- (1644-1648) Øllegaard Hartvigsdatter von Pentz, gifted 1) to von Barnewitz, 2) von Passow
- (1648-1653) Friedrich von Barnewitz
- (1653- ) Ida Jørgensdatter Grubbe, gift von Barnewitz
- ( -1674) Øllegaard Frederiksdatter von Barnewitz, gift of Bülow
- (1674) Christian von Bülow
- (1674-1677) Joachim von Bülow
- (1677-1679) Jens Rodsteen
- (1679-1692) Christian von Bülow
- (1679-1719) Frederik Rodsteen
- (1679- ) Else Magdalene Sybille Rodsteen, gift of Lehsten
- ( -1689) Georg Henrik von Lehsten
- (1692-1728) Frederik Barnewitz von Bülow
- (1719-1723) Jens Christopher von Lehsteb
- (1728-1755) Casper Frederik Barnewitz von Bülow
- (1755-1757) Ida Margrethe Reventlow, gift of Knuth
- (1757-1805) Conrad Ditlev Knuth
- (1805-1808) Conradine Augusta Reventlow, gift of Knuth
- (1808-1815) Carl Conrad Gustav Knuth
- (1815-1819) Boet efter Carl Conrad Gustav Knuths
- (1819) Simon Andersen Dons og Johan Ferdinand de Neergaard
- (1819-1822) Søren Henrik Lund
- (1822-1840) Henrik August Lund
- (1840-1847) August Willads Bech
- (1847-1890) Carl Henrik Jacob Jensen
- (1890) Lollands Spare- og Laanebank
- (1890-1891) Frederik Georg Bøttern
- (1891-1908) Marie Bøttern
- (1908-1925) Lars Rasmussen / Peter Rasmussen
- (1925-1926) Lars Rasmussen
- (1926-1938) Lars Rasmussens dødsbo
- (1938-1960) Knud Larsen Rasmussen
- (1960-1991) Fredsholm Gods A/S v. Familien Rasmussen
- (1991- ) Gustav Erik von Rosen
- (2011- ) Fredsholm Gods A/S
