= Carl Conrad Gustav Knuth =

Danish landowner

Carl Conrad Gustav, Baron Knuth
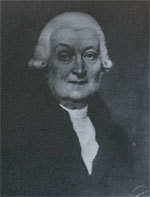
- Born: 20 November 1761
- Died: 20 December 1815; Rudbjerggaard, Denmark
- Occupation: Landowner

Carl Conrad Gustav, Baron Knuth (20 November 1761 – 20 December 1815) was a Danish landowner and 2nd Director of the Royal Danish Mail. He owned the estates Fredsholm, Gottesgabe and Rudbjerggaard on the island of Lolland.

== Early life and career ==
Knuth was born on 20 November 1761 in Copenhagen, the son of Supreme Court justice and chamberlain Conrad Ditlev, Baron Knuth of Conradsborg and Conradine Augusta née Countess Reventlow.

He was in 1783 appointed kammerjunker, graduated in law from the University of Copenhagen in 1785 and was then for a while an auskultant (trainee) in the Treasury (rentekammeret).

In 1801, Knuth was appointed as 3rd Director of Generalpostamtet, In 1802, he was appointed as chamberlain (kammerherre) and 2nd Director. In 1703, he participated in the negotiations for the dissolution of the Danish post office in Hamburg. He resigned in 1809.

== Property ==
Knuth owned the estates Fredsholm, Gottesgabe, Rudbjerggaard Stensø and Kallehavegaard.

== Personal life ==
Knuth married twice. His first wife was Susanne le Sage de Fontenay (23 February 1766 – 14 February 1812), a daughter of Admiral Carl Frederik le Sage de Fontenay. They married on 17 May 1790 and had one son, Carl Conrad Gustav, Baron Knuth-Conradsborg, of Rudbjerggaard (17 August 1796 - 7 July 1855).

His second wife was Christiane Louise, Baroness Roll, née Humble (7 October 1775), a daughter of Franz Joachim Humble and Anna Maria née Neumann. They married on 7 March 1815.

Knuth died on 20 December 1815 at Rudbjerggaard-
