= Hans Christian Amberg (architect) =

Danish architect

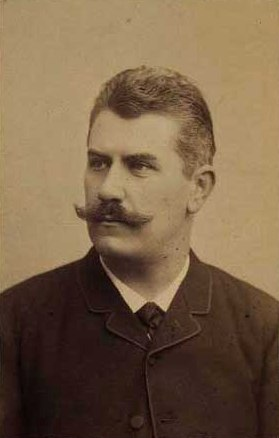
- Born: 23 September 1837
- Died: 6 November 1919 (aged 82)
- Education: Royal Danish Academy
- Occupation: Architect
- Awards: Knight of the Dannebrog
- Buildings: Christiansborg Palace, Højbro Plads

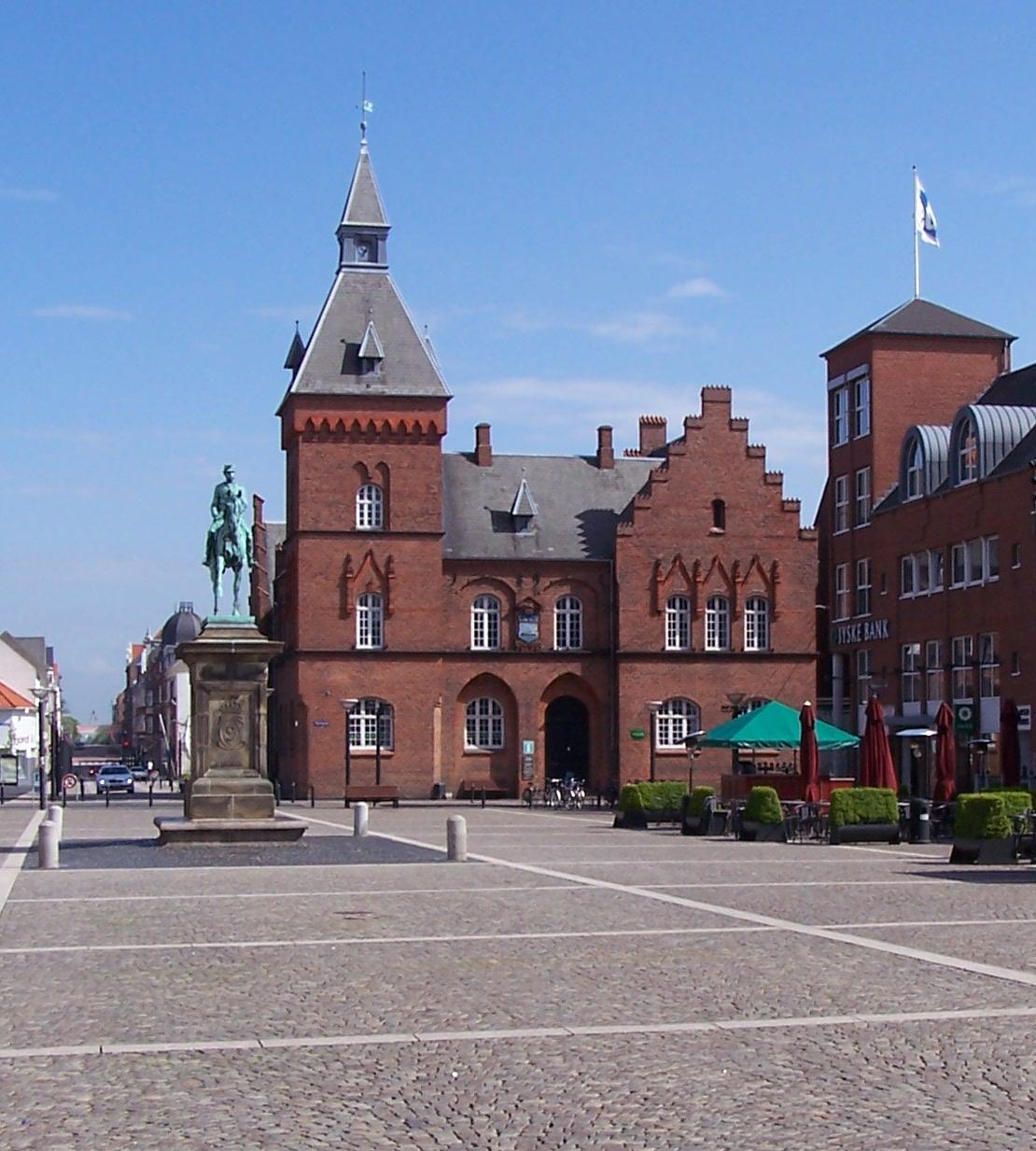
Tinghus in Esbjerg (1891)

Hans Christian Amberg (23 September 1837- 6 November 1919) was a Danish architect.

== Early life and education ==
After an apprenticeship as a carpenter, Amberg studied at the Royal Danish Academy's architecture school (1856–1865) while receiving instruction from Michael Gottlieb Bindesbøll, Christian Hansen and Ferdinand Meldahl. In 1874, he won the Academy's gold medal and spent the following two years travelling, mainly to Greece and Turkey.

Amberg exhibited at Charlottenborg Spring Exhibition (1863-1884), in Exposition Universelle (1878) in Paris, the Nordic Industrial, Agricultural and Art Exhibition (1888) in Copenhagen, and Copenhagen's City Hall exhibition (1901).

== Career ==
Amberg won a competition to design Christiansborg Palace in 1887. Amberg's design was used in the replacement building in Højbro Plads after St Nicholas Church was destroyed in the fire of 1795.

Amberg's approach, like that of his contemporaries, was influenced by the Historicist requirement to adopt one or more historical styles in every assignment. He designed buildings in the Faroe Islands, including a residence in Thorshavn and Ejde Church (Ejde Kirke) on the island of Suðuroy (1880–1881); both with characteristic pyramid spires. His Tinghus in the centre of Esbjerg (1891) and the manor at Vindeholme near Nakskov (1913) are also notable.

His greatest achievements were, however, in the area of restoration and renovation work including that on the town hall of Ribe (1882–1884) and Ribe Cathedral (1882–1904) as well as the old priory at Mariager Abbey (1891–1892). He also restored St Nicolas Church and, under the sponsorship of Carl Jacobsen, redesigned its spire (1908–1910); in collaboration with Carl Brummer, he designed a spire for the Church of Our Lady in Copenhagen. The latter project was, however, not completed prior to Jacobsen's death.

Jacobsen was a Knight of the Dannebrog and held the Dannebrogordenens Hæderstegn.

== Personal life ==
He died in Copeghagen during 1919. He was buried at Holmens Kirkegård.

== Selected works ==
- Ejde Kirke at Østerø (1880-1881)
- Villadsens Gård (1884)
- Main building at Vindeholme (1913)
- Kunsthallen Nikolaj (1915-1917)
