= Lystrup, Faxe Municipality =

Lystrup
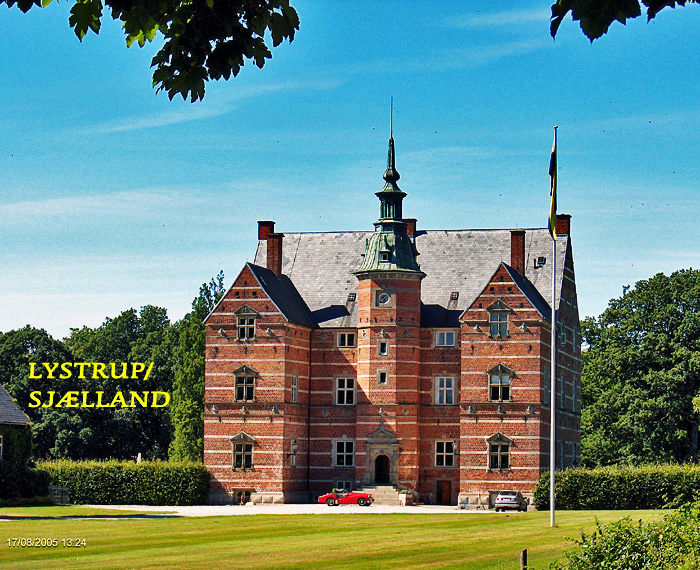
- Interactive map of the Lystrup area

General information
- Architectural style: Dutch Renaissance
- Location: Lystrupvej 9, 4640 Faxe, Denmark
- Coordinates: 55°15′40″N 12°3′52″E
- Completed: 1579

Lystrup is a manor house and estate located two kilometres west of Faxe, in Faxe Municipality, Denmark. The Dutch Renaissance style main building was built in 1579 for Chancellor of the Realm Eiler Grubbe (1532–1585). In the late 1600s, the main building was rebuilt and a new south wing was erected.

== History ==
=== Godov family ===
Lystrup was created when the farms in a village by the same name was merged into a single manor. It is first mentioned in 1403 when it belonged to Olsen Godo. After Oluf Pedersen Godov's death, it was passed on to his daughter Regitse Olufdatter Godov. She was married to Palle Andersen Ulfeldt.

=== Grubbe family ===
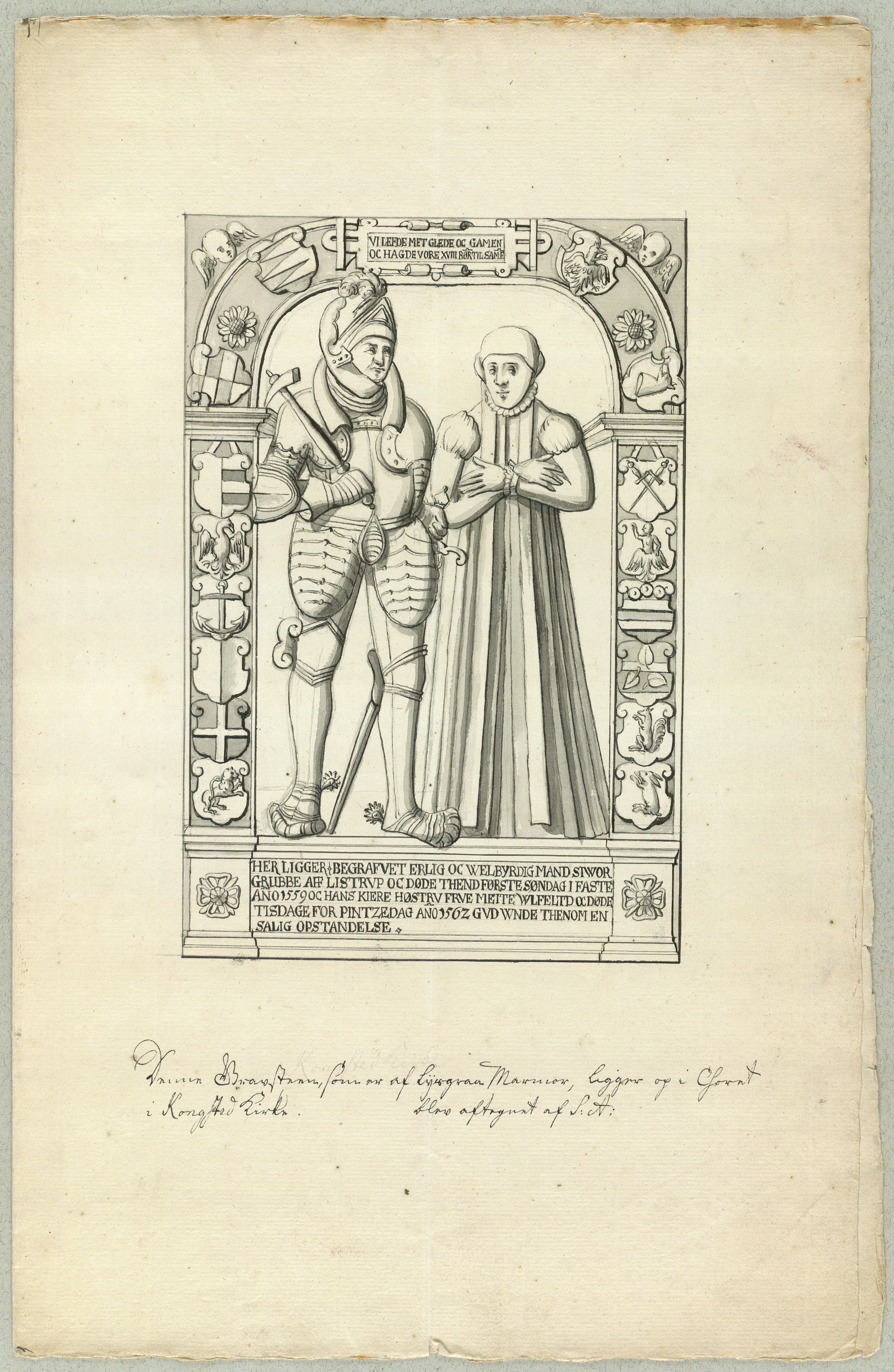
Drawing by Søren Abildgaard of Sivert Grubbe and his wife's ledgerstone in Kongsted Church

Their daughter, Mette Ulfeldt, married Sivert Grubbe. He was one of the signatories of the act that instituted Protestantism in Denmark in 1536, Grubbe had many children. One of his sons, Jørgen Grubbe, fell into captivity in Turkey and later settled in East Prussia. Another son disappeared abroad. When Grubbe died in 1559, Lystrup was therefore passed on to his youngest son, Eiler Grubbe (1532–1585), who had served as a secretary at Crown Prince Frederick's court in Malmöhus. He married Else Laxmand in 1559. He was appointed to treasurer (rentemester) in 1560 and Chancellor of the Realm in 1570.

After Eiler Grubbe's death in 1585, Lystrup was passed to his son Christian Grubbe. He led a quiet life on his estate without offices at the court and did not marry until the age of 37. His son, Peder Grubbe, who served in the Torstenson War (1643–1645), inherited Lystrup after his father. He had to sell some of his estates but kept Lystrup. After his death, it was passed to his son Tønne Grubbe (1651–1721). He was rather unstable and for a while imprisoned at Kastelle in Copenhagen. He married Wilhelmine Hedevig von Winsheim (1659–1710) but the couple had no children. He died in 1721 at the age of 70 as the last member of the Grubbe family in Denmark.

=== Changing owners ===
A few years prior to his death, Tønne Grubbe had endowed Lystrup to Claus Bendix Beenfeldt who was married to Christine Cathrine Statlander, a niece of Grubbe's late wife. He was an army officer but was dismissed after the end of the Great Northern War in 1720. The family then settled on the Lystrup estate. In 1740, he also acquired the neighbouring estate at Jomfruens Egede north-west of Faxe.

Claus Bendix Beenfeldt had two daughters, Anna Vilhelmine Beenfeldt (1720–1775) and Christine Ulrikke Beenfeldt (1723–1781). Anne Vilhelmine Beenfeldt married Christian Holmsted (1715–1754) while her sister married his twin brother Thomas Holmsted (1715–1773). In 1750, Claus Bendix Beenfeldt ceded Lystrup to Christian Holmsted and Jomfruens Egede to Thomas Holmsted. After Christian Holmsted's early death in 1754, Anna Vilhelmine Beenfeldt married Niels Rosenkrantz von Holstein-Rathlou. When Anna Vilhelmine Beenfeldt died in 1775, he then married her sister, Christine Ulrikke Beenfeldt, who had become a widow a couple of years earlier. After Niels Rosenkrantz von Holstein-Rathlou's death in 1786, Lystrup was passed to Christian Frederik von Holstein-Rathlou (1758–1828), his son by Anna Vilhelmine Beenfeldt.

=== Mylius family ===
Christian Frederik von Holstein-Rathlou's son-in-law, Johan Caspar Mylius (1776–1852) purchased the estate in 1831. He was already the owner of a number of other estates. After his death in 1852, it was endowed to his eldest son, Johan Jacob Mylius (1816–1857). After his death in 1857, Lystrup was passed on to his brother, Frederik Vilhelm de Mylius, who sold it.

=== Moltke family ===
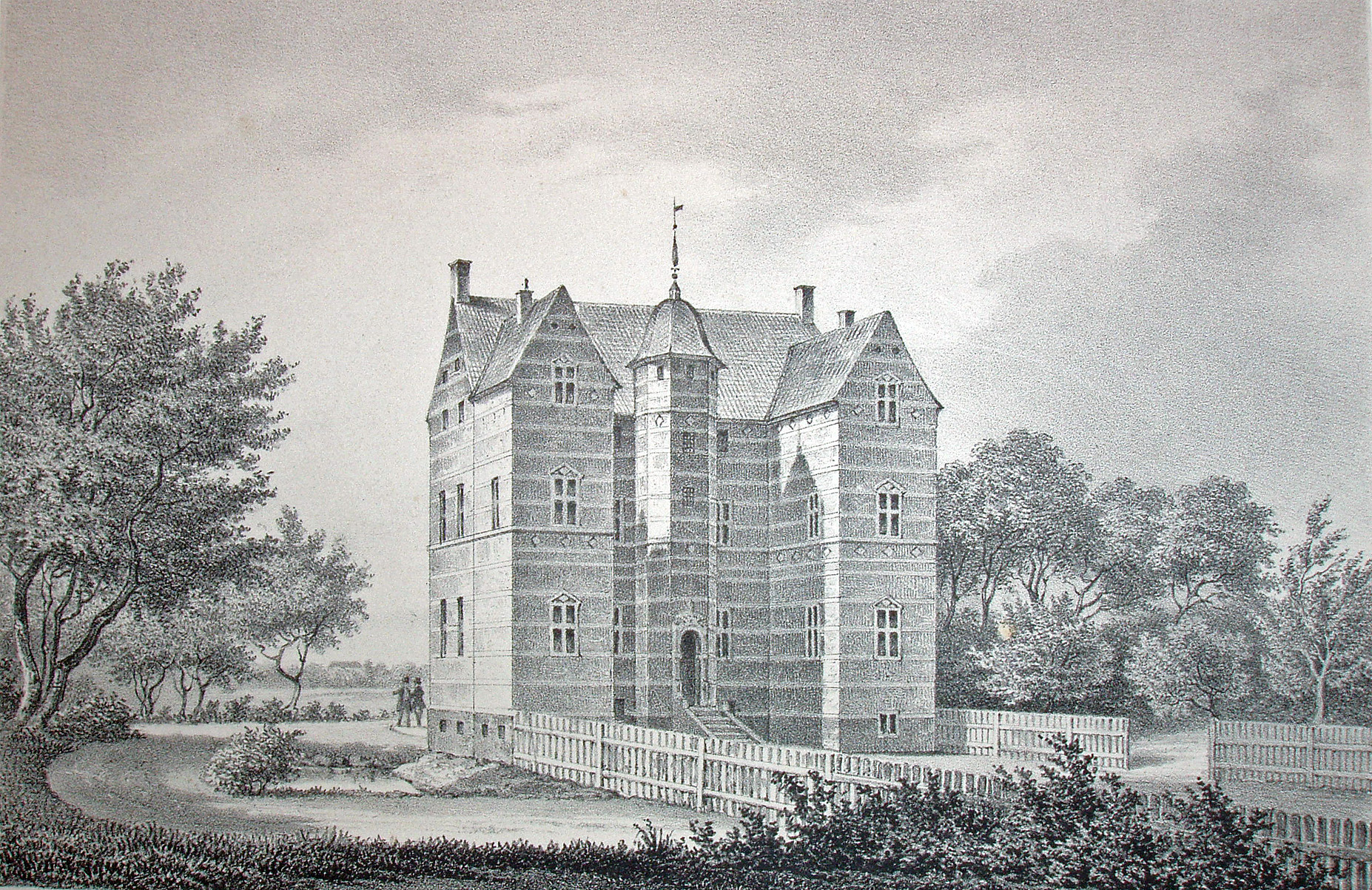
Lystrup, depicted by Ferdinand Richard in 1861

The new owner was Carl Henrik Moltke (1833–1918). He renovated the main building and lived there until his death. Lystrup was after his death in 1918 passed on to his son Aage Molkte (1866–1943). The estate is still owned by members of his family.

== Today ==
Lystrup Manor covers 340 hectares of land. Lystrup and Jomfruens Egede have a total area of 1304 hectares (1998) of which 849.7 is farmland, 34.3 hectares is pastures and 487 hectares is woodland.

== List of owners ==
- (1403) Peder Olsen Godov
- (1433) Oluf Pedersen Godov
- (1473– ) Palle Andersen Ulfeldt
- ( –1559) Sivert Grubbe
- (1559–1585) Eiler Grubbe
- (1585– ) Christian Grubbe
- (1630–1675) Peder Christiansen Grubbe
- (1675–1717) Tønne Pedersen Grubbe
- (1721–1750) Claus Bendix Beenfeldt
- (1750–1754) Christian Holmsted
- (1754– ) Anna Wilhelmine Beenfeldt, gift 1) Holmsted, 2) Rosenkrantz von Holstein-Rathlou
- ( –1786) Niels Rosenkrantz von Holstein-Rathlou
- (1786–1828) Christian Frederik von Holstein-Rathlou
- (1828–1831) Boet efter Chr. Fr. von Holstein-Rathlou
- (1831–1852) Johan Caspar Mylius
- (1852–1857) Johan Jacob Mylius
- (1857) Sigismund Volf Veit de Mylius
- (1857–1918) Christian Henrik Carl Moltke
- (1918–1943) Aage Moltke
- (1943–1957) Ivar Christian Eiler Moltke
- (1957– ) Christian Aage James Moltke
- (1990–present) Joachim Godske Norman Moltke

== See also ==
- Jomfruens Egede
