= Kattrup =

Historical property near Jyderup, Denmark

Kattryp
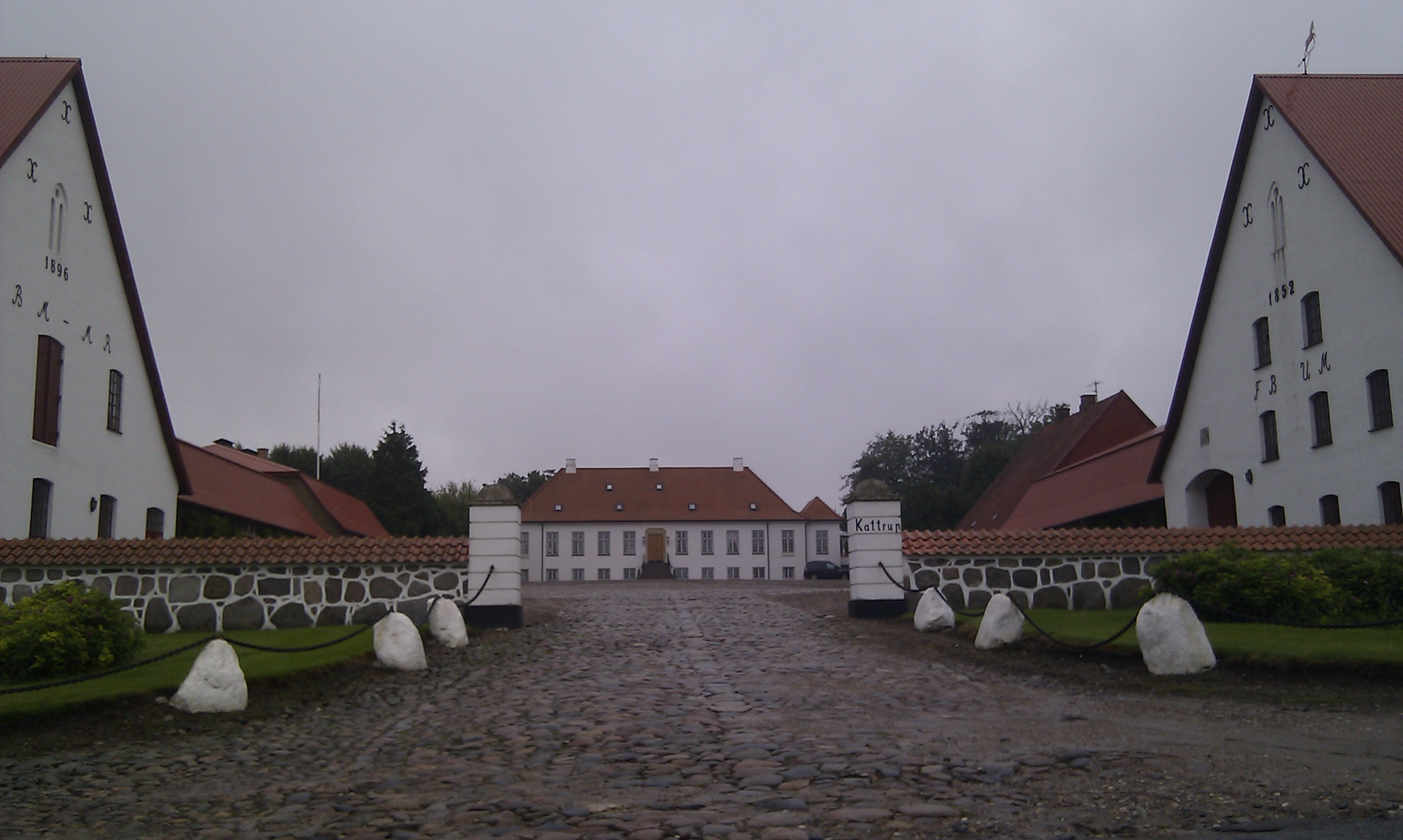
- The main building seen from the north
- Interactive map of the Kattryp area

General information
- Location: Denmark, Kattrupvej 24; 4450 Jyderup
- Coordinates: 55°36′37.9″N 11°22′22.3″E
- Owner: Peter Anders Møller

Website
- kattrupgods.dk

Kattrup is a manor house and estate located south of Jyderup, Kalundborg Municipality, 90 kilometres west of Copenhagen, Denmark.

== History ==
=== Early history ===
In the Middle Ages Kattrup was the name of a village with a farm by the same name. In 1339, Queen Margrethe I presented it to Sorø Abbey. In 1444, Sorø Abbey ceded it to the Roskilde Bishopric in exchange for other property. After the Reformation, together with all other property of the Catholic Church, it was confiscated by the Crown.

=== 1561–1700 ===
In 1561, Kattrup was acquired by Laurits Iversen Serlin in exchange for property elsewhere. At the same time, it was granted the status of a manor. In 1580, Katrup passed to his son, Christoffer Lauridsen Serlin. On Selin's death, Katrup passed to his son-in-law Rasmus Skade. It was later passed down to his son Christoffer Skade. In 1627, Kuserup belonged to his brother Niels Skade. Kyserup was later merged with Katrup. In 1655, Christoffer Skade's heirs sold Katrup to Axel Juul of Volstrup.

In 1664, Kattrup was acquired by royal treasurer Henrik Müller. He would later become one of the largest landowners in the country. In the 1680s, he passed Kattrup to his son Christian Müller, who in 1689 ceded it to his brother Frantz Müller. Frantz Müller died in 1705.

=== 18th century ===
In 1705, Kattrup was sold at auction to Christian Paludan. It was later sold, first to Bolle Luxdorph Rose and then in 1718 to Hans Philip Bochenhoffer. Bochenhoffer was in debt to Marie Juul of Kragerupgaard, and he ended up ceding the ownership of the estate to her. In 1742, she ceded the estate to her son-in-law Anton Günther Ellbrecht.

In 1751, Kattrup was acquired by district judge Peder Kraft. His widow sold it to Jørgen v. Hjelmcrone. He ran into economic difficulties and had to sell the estate in 1775. The new owner was Major H. Focken.

=== Mylius family ===
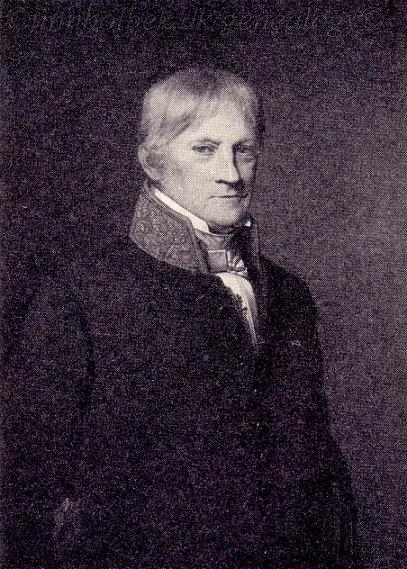
Johan Caspar Mylius

In 1800, Kattrup was acquired by Johan Caspar Mylius. He left Kattrup in the hands of his mother, Ulrika Cathrine de Mylius, after having purchased Estruplund and a number of other estates. She was also the owner of Rønninge Søgård on Funen. Mylius reacquired Kattrup after her death in 1831. He sold the estate to J.F. Adeler in 1835, but reacquired it when Adeler went bankrupt the following year.

After Mylius' death in 1852, Kattrup was passed on to his son-in-law, Frederik Emil Herman Bernstorff. He was succeeded by his son Ulrich Bernstorff-Mylius. He demolished the old main building in 1896 and constructed a new one in 1925. After his death in 1930, Kattrup was passed on to his son Andreas Peter Bernstorff-Mylius.

=== The Møller family ===
Arnold Peter Møller, the founder of A.P. Møller - Mærsk, purchased Kattrup in 1949. After his death, Kattrup went to his daughter Sally Mc-Kinney Møller.

== Architecture ==
The Neoclassical main building is from 1925 and was designed by Jens Ingwersen. It is a whitewashed building with two corner risalits. The roof is a hipped red tile roof.

The building is located on the south side of a large courtyard. The courtyard is flanked by older farm buildings from the 19th century. To the south of the main building is a large park with three ponds.

== Today ==
The estate is today owned by Peter Anders Møller. IThe estate covers 1,023 hectares. Komtesseboligen is rented out for meetings, exhibitions and other events.

In 2023 plans were presented for rewilding of a 9,000 hectares area of land. The area will be known as Kattrup Mildnis. European bison, moose, horses and wild boar will roam freely in the grounds. Game from the area will be used for the production of high quality food products.

== List of owners ==
- ( –1393) The Crown
- (1393–1444) Sorø Abbey
- (1444–1536) Bishopric of Roskilde
- (1536–1561) The Crown
- (1561– ) Laurids Iversen Serlin
- ( – ) Christoffer Lauridsen Serlin
- ( –1602) Rasmus Skade
- (1602–1654) Christoffer Skade
- (1654–1655) Estate of Christoffer Skade
- (1655–1664) Axel Juul
- (1664– ) Henrik Müller
- ( –1689) Christian Müller
- (1689–1704) Frantz Müller
- (1704– ) Christian Paludan
- ( –1718) Bolle Luxdorph Rose
- (1718– ) Hans Philip Bockenhoffer
- ( –1742) Mette Marie Juul
- (1742–1751) Anton Günther v. Ellbrecht
- (1751– ) Peder Kraft
- ( –1765) Enke efter Peder Kraft
- (1765–1775) Jørgen v. Hjelmcrone
- (1775–1781) H. Focken
- (1781–1793) P. Gommesen Errebo
- (1793–1800) Peder Ole Borch Møller
- (1800–1804) Johan Caspar Mylius
- (1804–1831) Ulrika Catharina Mylius (née Rasch)
- (1831–1835) Johan Caspar Mylius
- (1835–1836) J.F. Adeler
- (1836–1852) Johan Caspar Mylius
- (1852–1894) Frederik Bernstorff
- (1894–1925) Ulrich Bernstorff-Mylius
- (1925–1949) Andreas Peter Bernstorff-Mylius
- (1949–1965) Arnold Peter Møller
- (1965–1972) Sally McKinney-Møller
- (1972–2007) Peter Arnold Poul Møller
- (2007– ) Peter Anders Møller
