= Johan Caspar Mylius =

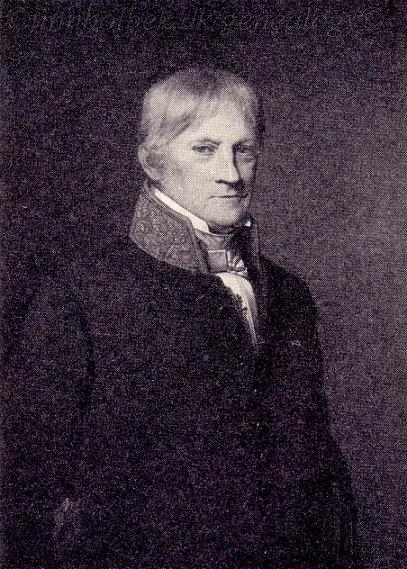
- Born: 22 October 1776; Odense, Denmark
- Died: 3 August 1845 (aged 68); Copenhagen, Denmark
- Resting place: Rønninge Søgård
- Occupations: Military officer and landowner
- Awards: Grand Cross of the Dannebrog

Johan Caspar Mylius (22 October 1776 – 15 September 1852) was a Danish military officer and landowner. He was appointed as chamberlain in 1840 and ennobled under the name de Mylius on 14 October 1840.

== Early life ==
Mylius was born in Odense, the son of Johann Jacob Mylius (6 April 1727 - 24 August 1803) and Ulrica Catharina Rasch (14 February 1748 - 7 August 1831).

== Career ==
Mylius was created a first lieutenant in 1801. He was appointed as captain á la suite in Nordre Sjællandske Landeværnsrgmt in 1802. artillery captain in 1803, Kompagnichef in Landeværnet in 1806, Kompagnichef in the Artillery in 1808. He was appointed as squire (kammerjunker) from 1809 to 1813.

Mylius was an alternate at the Stænderforsamlingen in Viborg in 1835-40 and represented at the assembly in 1838. He was appointed as chamberlain on 28 June 1840. He was ennobled on 14 October 1840. He was a member and the chairman of Kongsted Sogneforstanderskab in 1844-48.

== Property ==
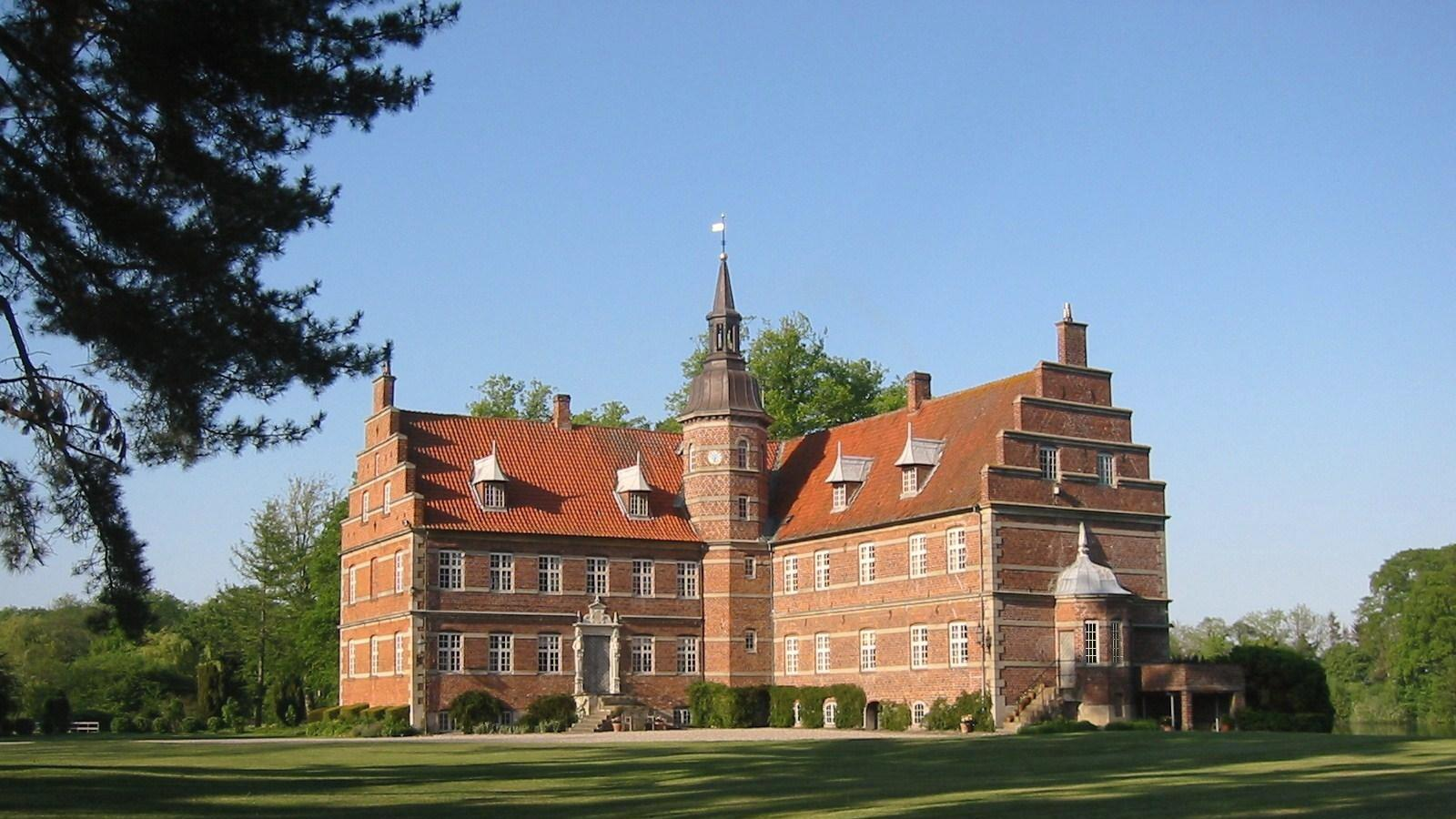
Rønninge Søgård

Mylius owned Stamhuset Rønninge Søgård (1831–40), Kattrup (1800–04), Estruplund (1806–51), Mylenberg (1813), Aarupgaard (Slet Hrd.), Aagaard (1822–28), Raschenberg (1831) and Lystrup (1831). He was a co-owner of VilIestrup (1812–13).

== Personal life and legacy ==
Mylius married Wilhelmine Christiane Ulrica von Holstein (1 June 1784 - 12 June 1861).

He established by testament of 14 January 1852 Det Mylius-Aarupgaardske, Det Mylius-Raschenbergske og Det Mylius-Mylenbergske Fideikommis as well as Det Mylius'ske Familielegat - Legatstifter.
