= Eiler Grubbe =

Danish politician (1532–1858)

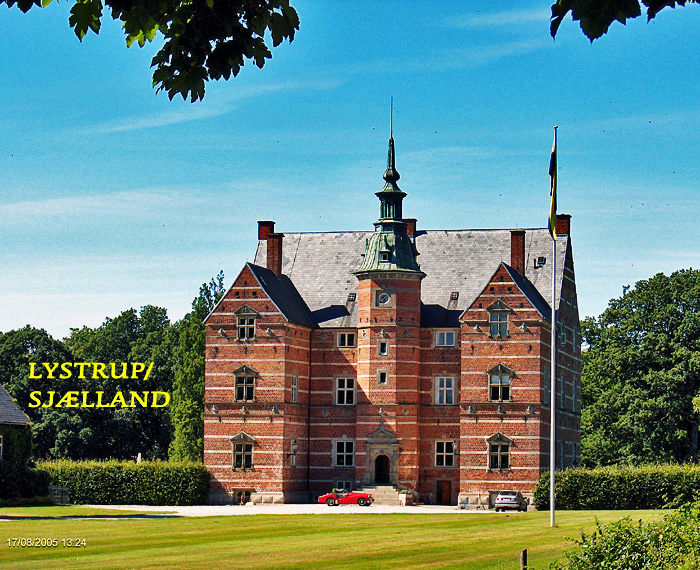
Lystrup Castle, built by Eiler Grubbe in 1579

Eiler Grubbe (28 March 1532 – 20 November 1585) was a Danish statesman. He became Master of Finances in 1560 and Chancellor of Denmark and member of the Council of the Realm in 1570. He was also fiefholder of Tryggevælde, Vordingborg and Jungshoved. He rebuilt his family seat Lystrup as a castle in the Dutch renaissance style in 1579.
