= Brejninggaard =

Former manor house in Denmark

Coordinates: 56.1153°N 8.5128°E

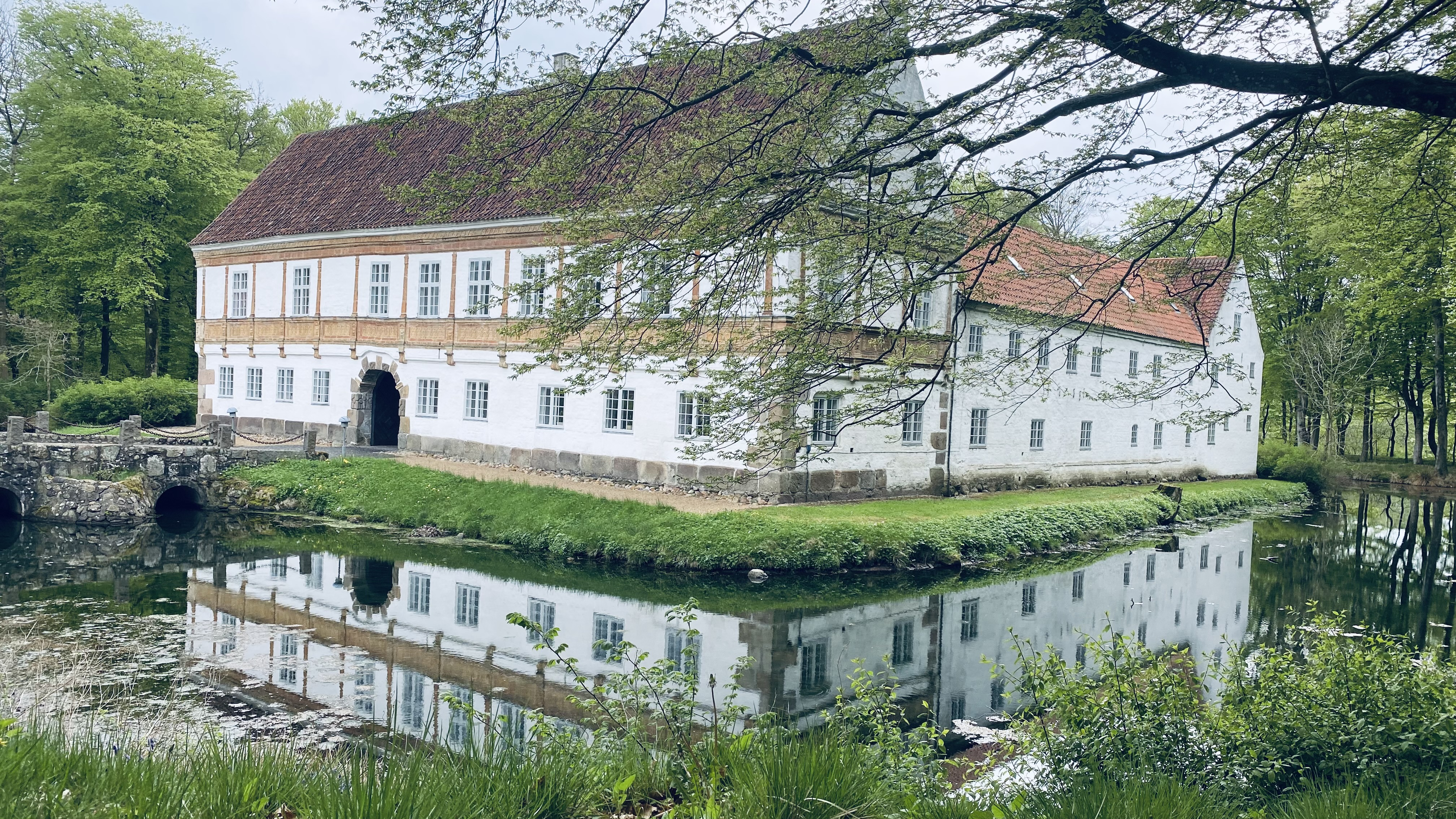

- Location in Denmark

General information
- Type: Manor house (former), School (current)
- Architectural style: Renaissance
- Location: Near Spjald, Ringkøbing-Skjern Municipality, Denmark
- Current tenants: Brejninggaard Efterskole
- Completed: c. 1580
- Renovated: 1942, 1956–1959
- Client: Gunde Lange (original owner)

Design and construction
- Architect: Helge Holm (20th-century additions)
- Known for: Renaissance architecture with unique terracotta decorations

Brejninggaard is a former manor house located near Spjald, Ringkøbing-Skjern Municipality, in western Jutland, Denmark.

== History ==
In the Middle Ages the estate belonged to the bishops of Ribe. In 1544, it was sold to the nobleman Gunde Lange. His son Hans Lange constructed a new main building later in the century. The main building has been extensively renovated and remodeled several times, so there are only a few remains of the original building.

== Architecture ==
The main building was erected around 1580 by in Renaissance-style red bricks and consisted of four built-in wings, with a tower with spiral staircase in the south-west corner of the courtyard. The original house was a four-winged complex but only the east and north wings have survived. The east wing, which contains the gate, is decorated with a ceramic frieze and pilasters. Similar decorations have been found on the courtyard side of the north wig. This kind of terracotta decoration is common in northern Germany but unseen elsewhere in Denmark.

The land was sold off in lots in 1926. A new west wing was built in 1942 and followed by construction of the south wing between 1956–1959. The west wing from 1942 and the south wing from 1958 were both designed by architect Helge Holm. The building were converted for use as a school. The building now houses Brejninggaard Efterskole.
