= Øllegaard Hartvigsdatter Pentz =

Danish noble and landholder

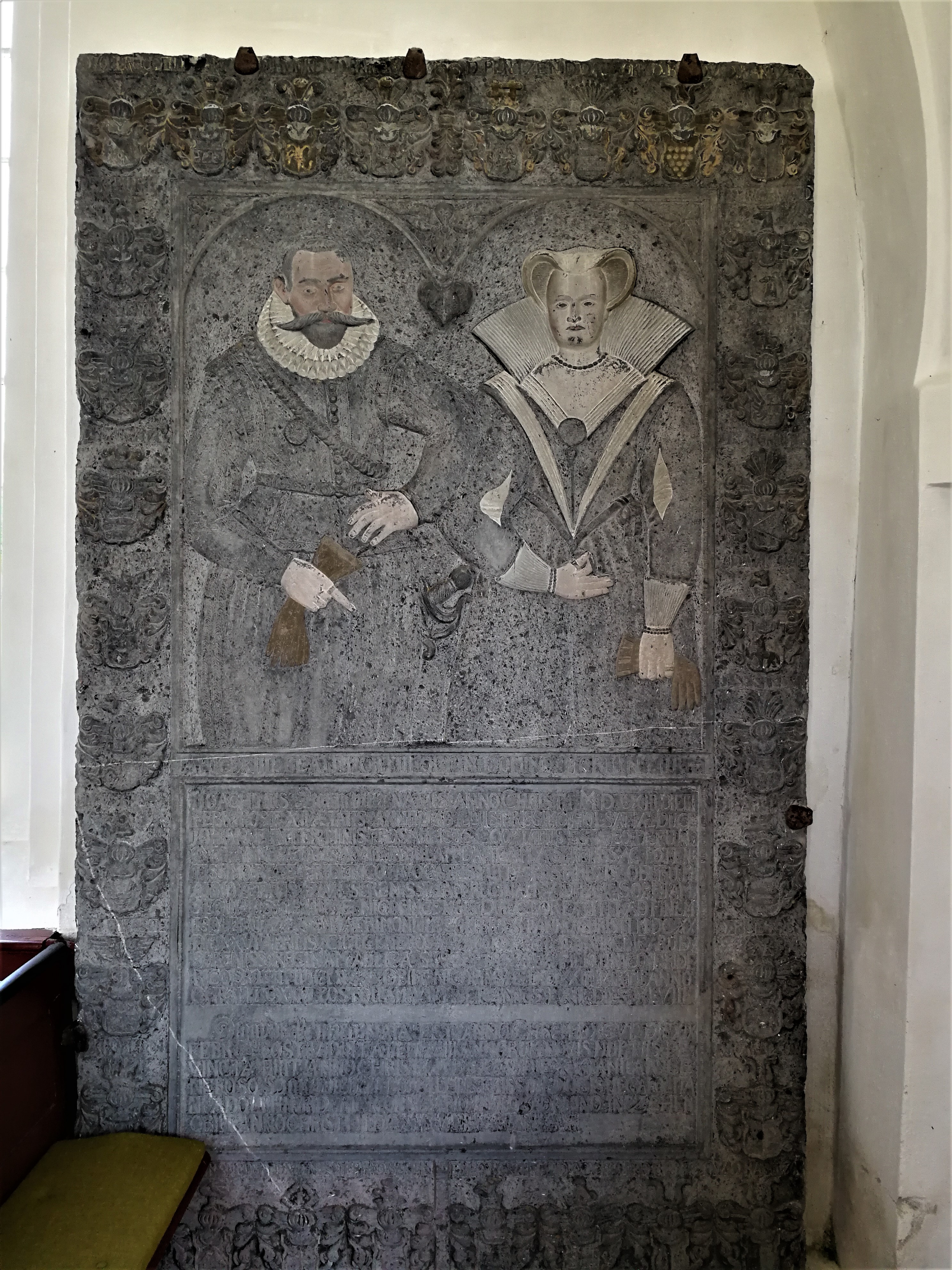
Epitaph to Joachim von Barnewitz and Øllegård Pentz in Tillitse Church

Øllegaard Hartvigsdatter Pentz (19 February 1594 – 6 July 1654) was a Danish noble and landholder. Her holdings included the estates Rudbjerggård and Fredsholm on Lolland.

== Biography ==
Øllegaard Hartvigsdatter Pentz was born on 19 February 1594, the daughter and only child of Hartvig Pentz (d. 1632) and Ilsabe von Daldorf (1457–1637). She was first time married to Joachim von Barnewitz of Rubjerggård (1563–1626) in 1620.

Her marriage had turned her into a major landholder and she and frequently increased their size through the acquisition of more land. In 1630, she was able to establish a new manor, which was initially given the name Fritzholm or Friderichsholm, now changed to Fredsholm, after her only child, Friderich von Barnewitz.

Pantz was second time married to Hartvig von Passow of Zehne in 1535–1644.

In 1640, she ceded Rudbjerggård to her son. In circa 1648, she ceded Fredsholm to her son on the condition that she could remain on the estate until her death.
