= Abeline's House =

Museum in Denmark

Coordinates: 55.9455°N 8.1561°E

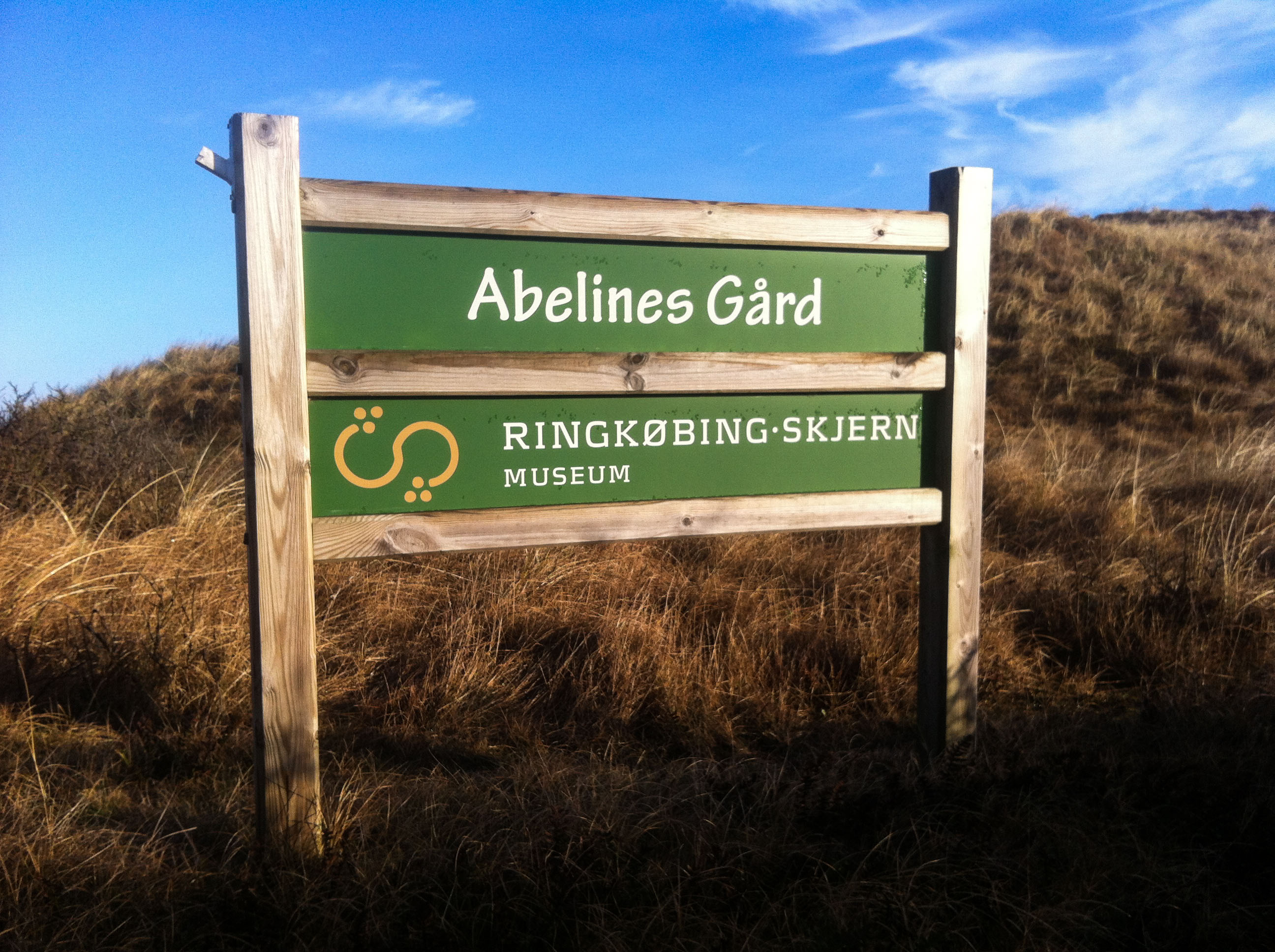
Abelines Gaard entrance sign

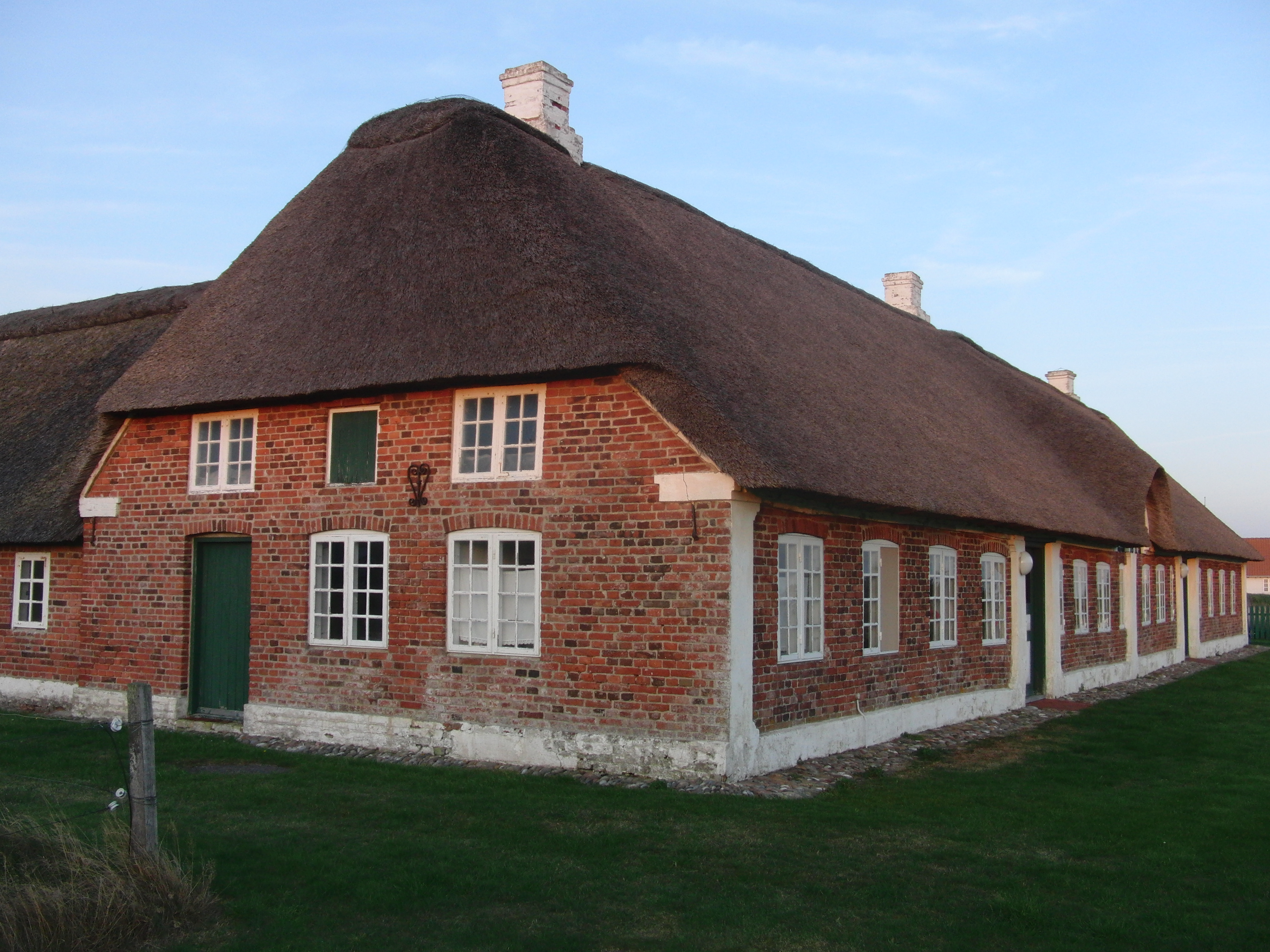
Abelines Gaard farmhouse

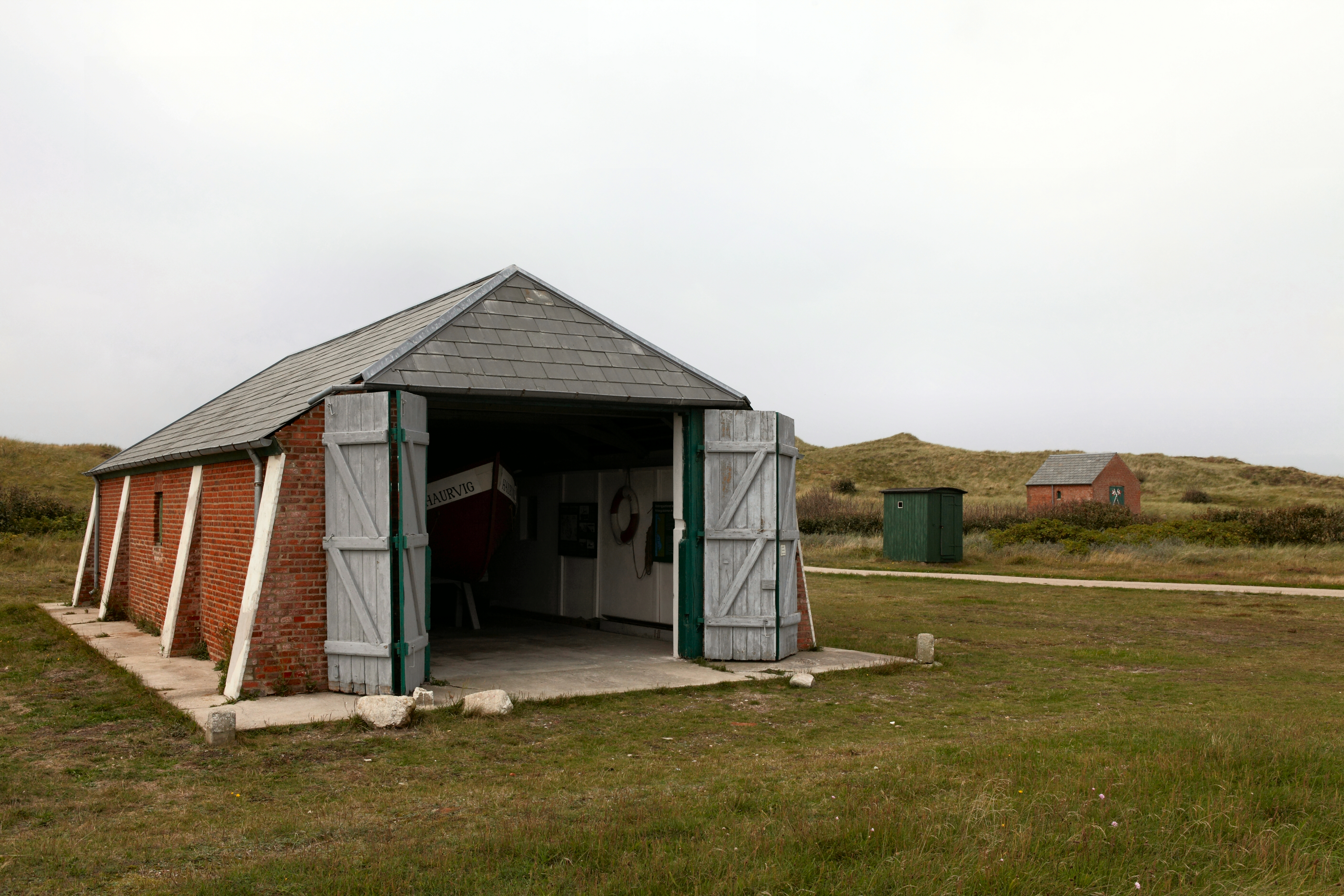
Haurvig redningsstation

Abeline's House (Danish: Abelines Gaard) is a former waterfront farmhouse at Haurvig, just south of Hvide Sande, Ringkøbing-Skjern Municipality, on the Danish West Coast. It was converted into a local history museum for Holmsland Dunes (Holmsland Klit) in the 1970s and is now part of Ringkøbing–Skjern Museum.

== History ==
The house is named after Abeline Christensen (1870-1957), whose father-in-law, Christen Christensen, together with his wife Kathrine, constructed the buildings between 1854 and 1871. Together with her husband Laurid, she took over the farm in 1890 but in 1904 she became a widow with five children in the age between six and 13. Abeline Christensen took over the position as wreckmaster, which was associated with the property, and continued to run the farm. From the 1920s she supplemented her income from summer guests who were staying on the farm. She also managed the local telephone exchange. Abeline lived on the farm with her son and daughter-in-law until her death in 1957.

On the opposite side of the road stands Haurvig Rescue Station (Haurvig Redningsstation), which was decommissioned in 1932. Abeline purchased the building and used it as a place where the local youth could dance to Gramophone records or accordion music until violations of the alcohol ban became too evident.

== Architecture ==
Abeline's House is four-winged farmhouse surrounding a cobbled yard. It is built to a vernacular design typical of the area. It is constructed in redbrick and has a thatched roof.

The building was listed in 1974. It was renovated in the 1990s and received a Europa Nostra Award in 1996.
