= Tillitse Church =

Church building in Lolland Municipality, Denmark

Coordinates: 54°45′58″N 11°09′27″E

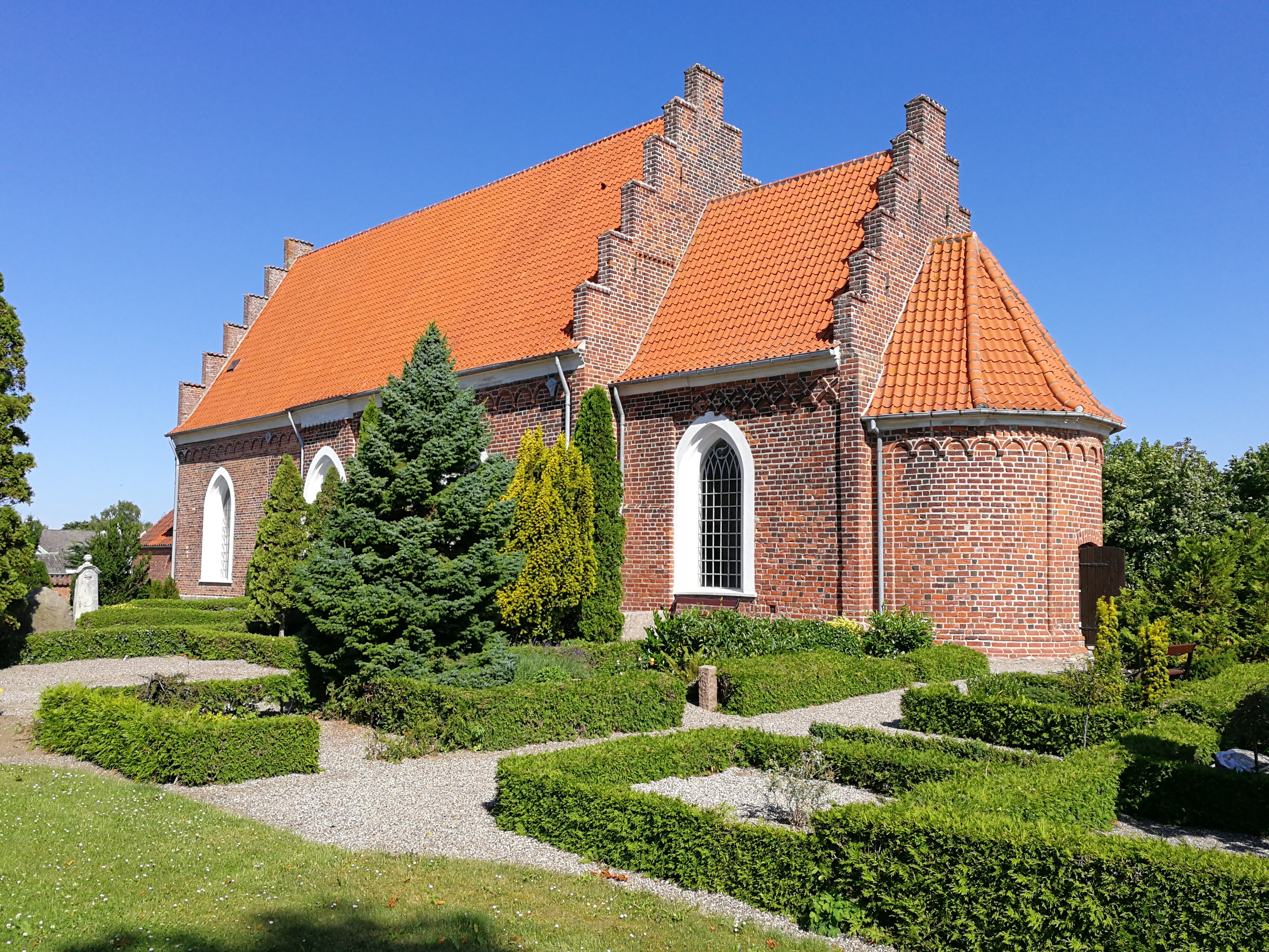
Tillitse Church, Lolland

Tillitse Church is a Romanesque building west of the village of Dannemare, some 8 km (5.0 mi) south of Nakskov on the Danish island of Lolland. Built of red brick in the first half of the 13th century, it has an intricately carved auricular altarpiece created by Jørgen Ringnis in 1642. An 11th-century runestone stands outside the church entrance.

== History ==
Built in the first half of the 13th century, the church was extended towards the west in the early 17th century. Little is known of its ownership in the Middle Ages but the Crown had clerical appointment rights at the time of the Reformation. In 1648, it was transferred to the ownership of the Rudbjerggård Estate where over the years it was governed by F.B. Bülow and Gustav Smith. It came into the ownership of Gustav Smith c. 1850 and was transferred to the Friderichsen family in 1850. In c. 1880, it was taken over by Landmandsbanken which transferred it to the local congregation in 1907.

== Architecture ==
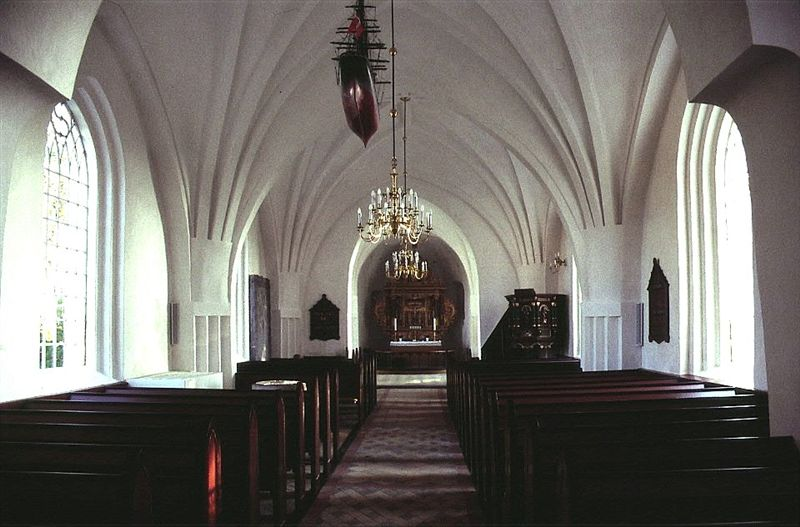
Interior

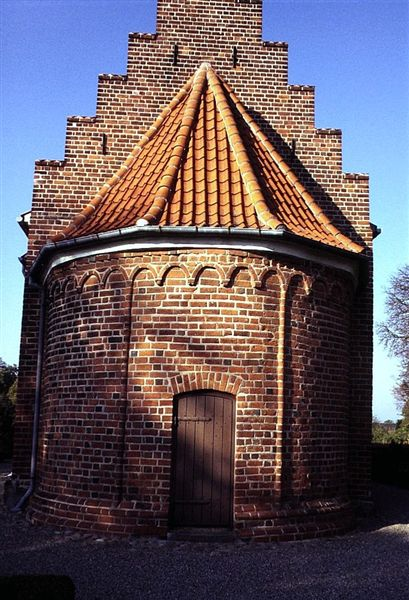
Apse

The church consists of a Romanesque apse, chancel and nave. It was extended towards the west in 1625 with a porch on the west gable in 1856. An arched frieze decorates the upper apse, topped by a saw-toothed cornice. Its three finely finished Romanesque windows have now been bricked up. The profile of the chancel's former south door can still be seen. There is a saw-tooth decoration along the top of the chancel with a more recent cornice. The remains of the nave's south portal extend up to the roof. The old Romanesque windows have been replaced by modern pointed-arch windows. There are lesenes on the east corner but those on the west corner have been removed. There is also an arched decorated topped by a saw-toothed line along the top of the nave.

== Interior and furnishings ==
The carved altarpiece from 1642 is the work of Jørgen Ringnis. It bears the arms of Joachim von Barnewitz, Øllegaard Pentz and Hartwig Passow. The Renaissance pulpit from 1608 presents the arms of Knud Rud and Ellen Marsvin. The church also contains a sandstone epitaph for Joachim von Barnewitz (died 1626) and Øllegaard Hartvigsdatter Pentz (1684–1654). There is a Romanesque font.

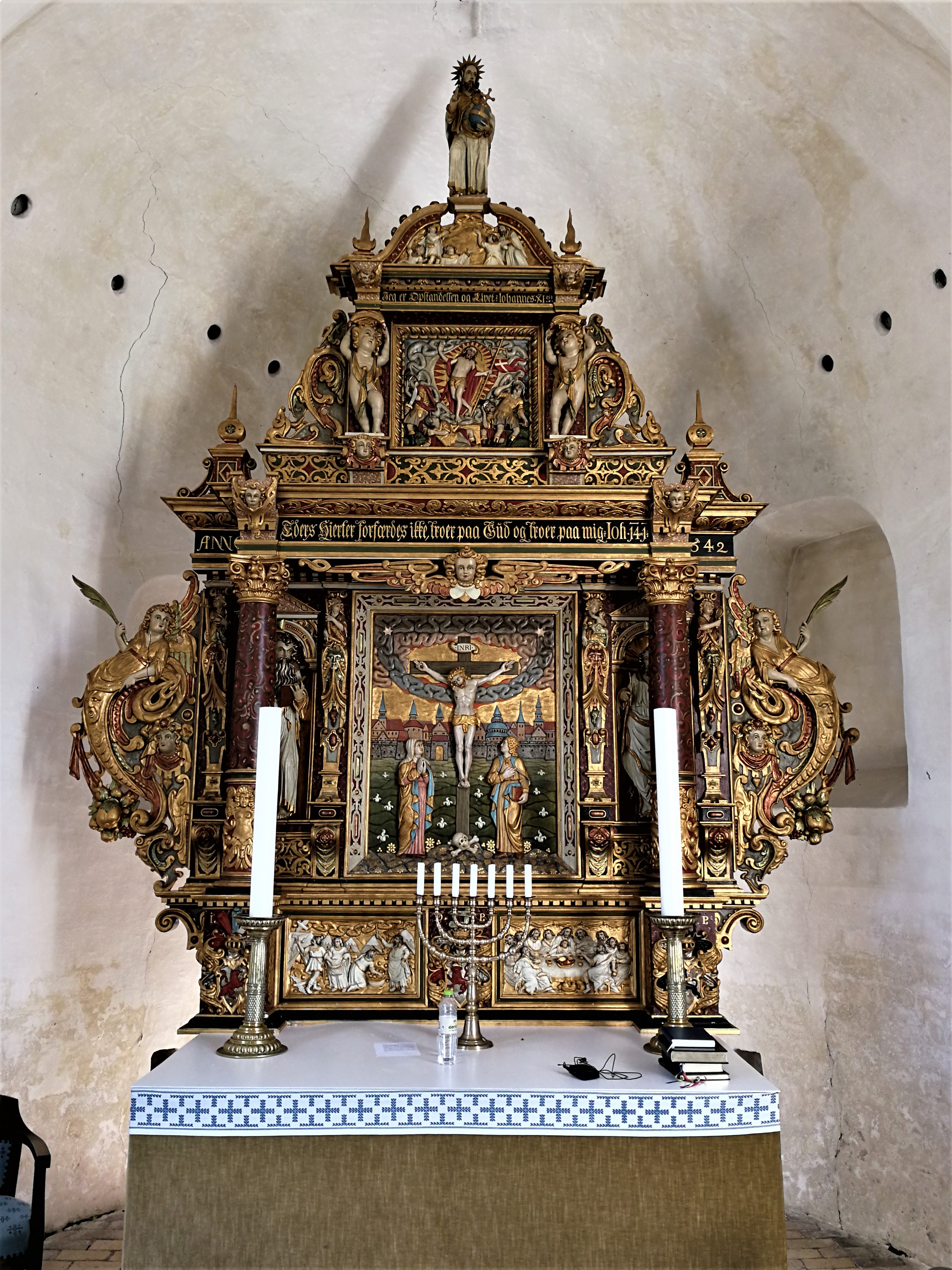
Altarpiece

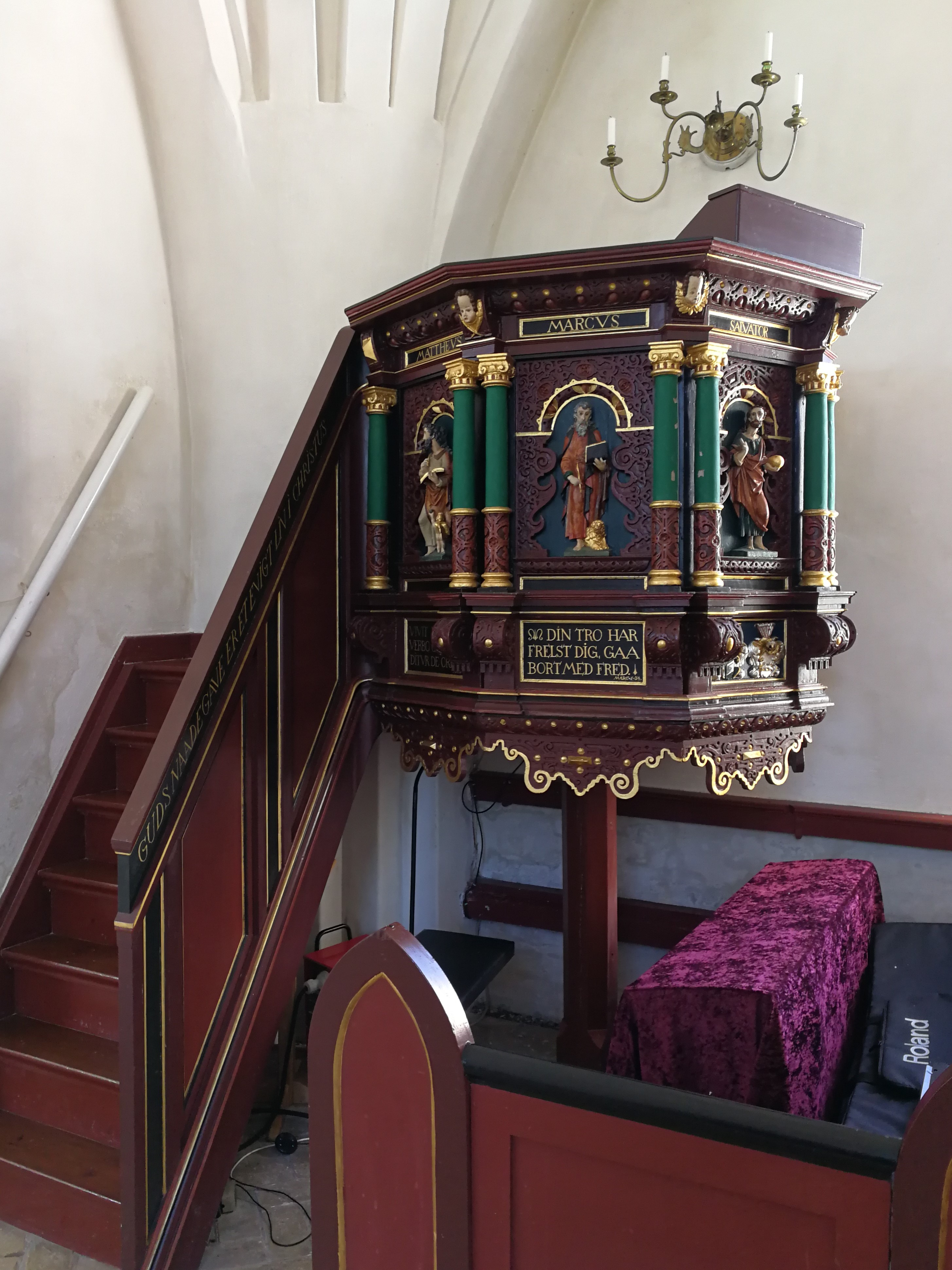
Pulpit

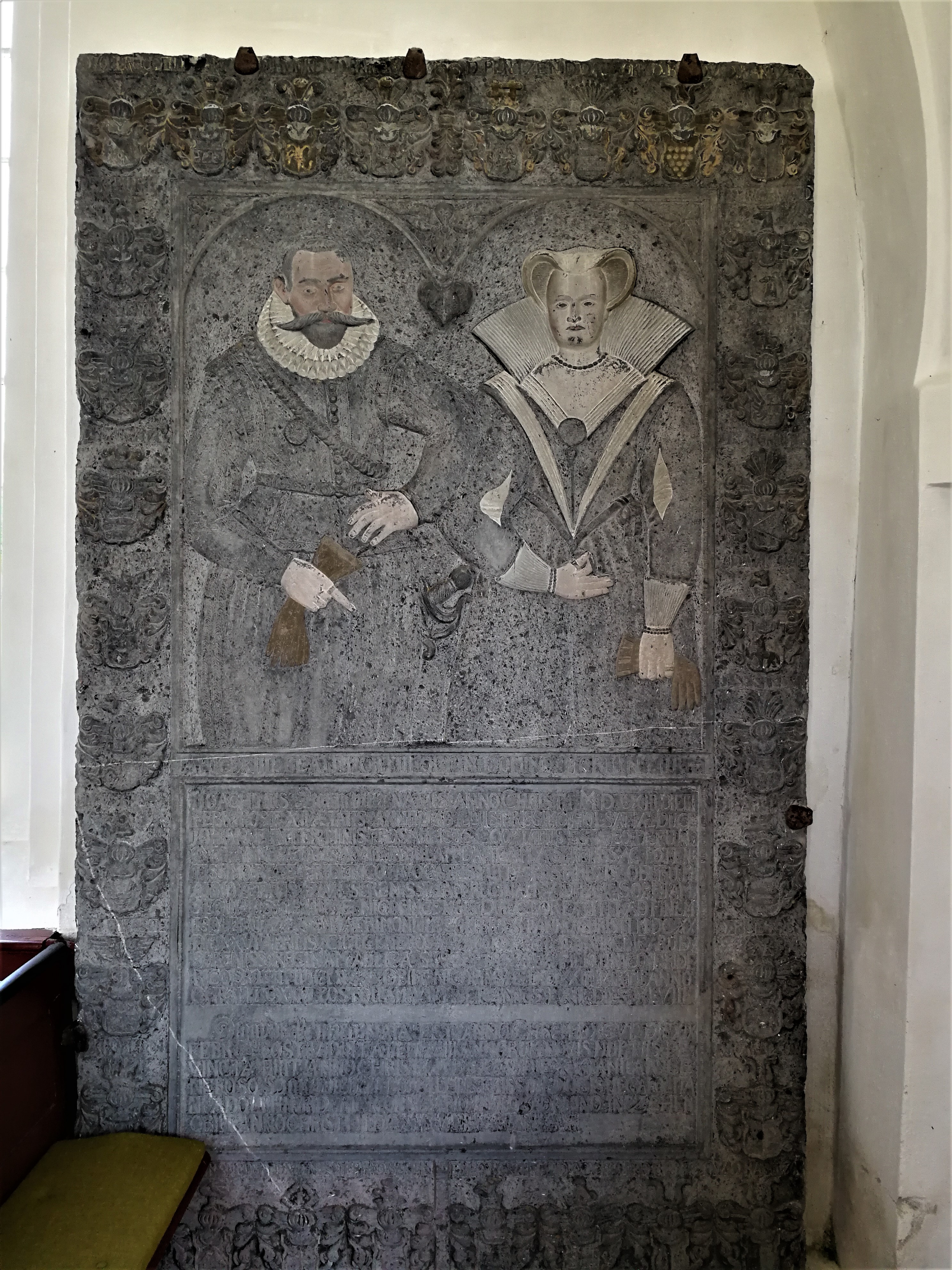
Epitaph

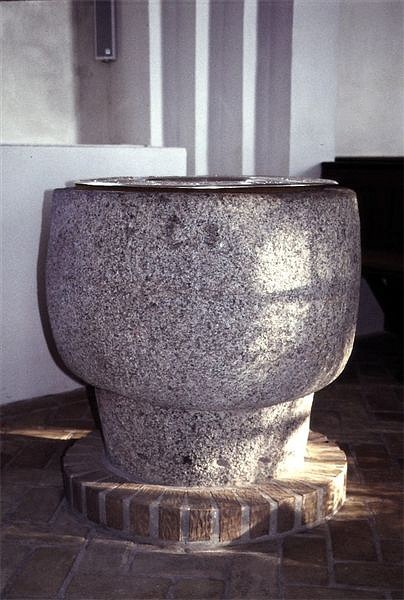
Font

== Graveyard ==
Notable people buried in the graveyard include Ludvig Eduard Alexander Reventlow, who purchased the Rudbjerggård estate in 1891.

== Runestone ==
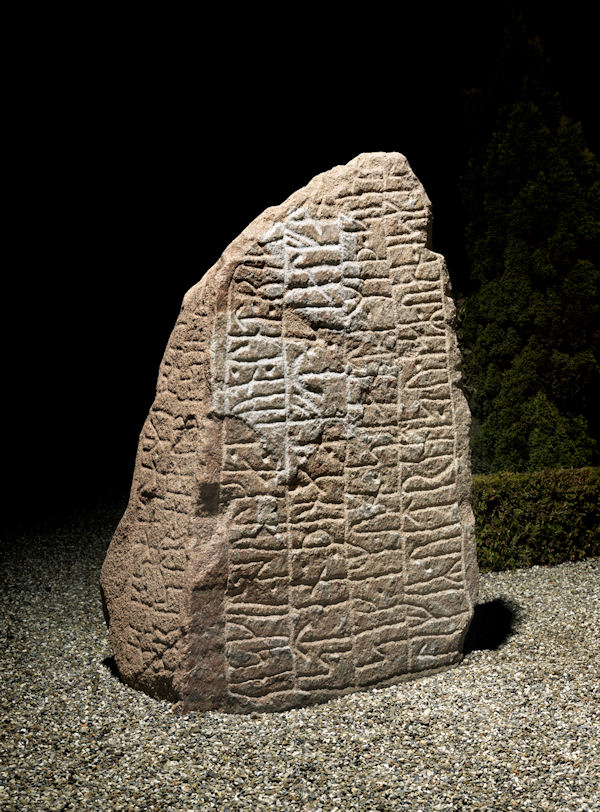
Runestone

There is a free-standing runestone listed as DR 212 in the Rundata catalog that is outside the church porch. It was originally found in the churchyard wall in c. 1627 and was later used as a foundation for the porch. Dated to the mid-11th century, it is 143 cm (56 in) high and 81 cm (32 in) wide. The stone contains two inscriptions which read (translated):

Áskell, Súlki's son, had this stone raised in memory of himself. Ever will stand, while the stone lives, this memento, which Áskell produced. May Christ and Saint Michael help his soul. Tóki carvedthe runes in memory of Þóra, his stepmother, a good wife.

== See also ==
- List of churches on Lolland
