= Vinderslevholm =

Manor house near Silkeborg, Denmark

Coordinates: 56.2538°N 9.4834°E

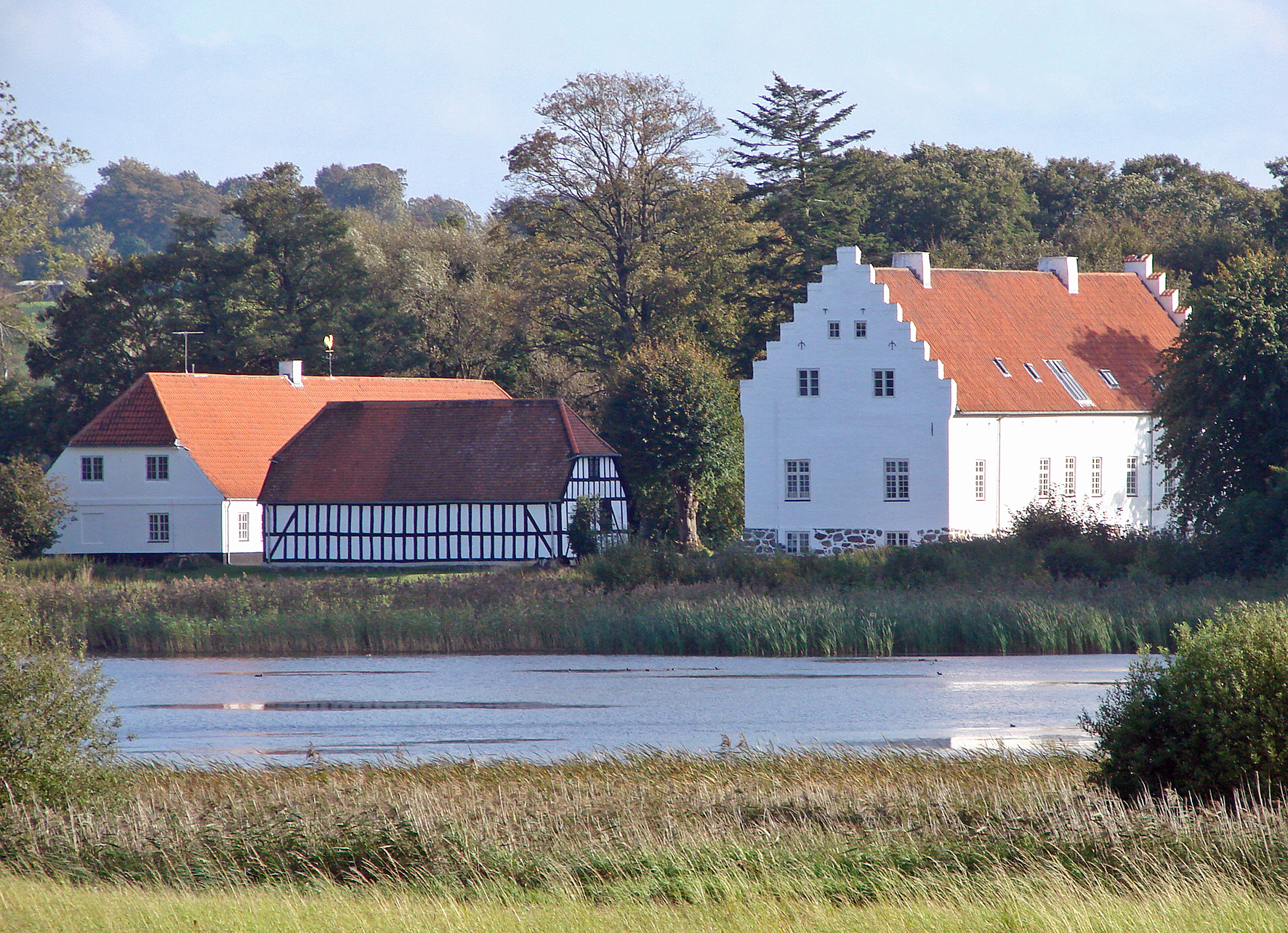
Vinderslevholm

Vinderslevholm is a Late Gothic manor house located 10 km (6 mi) northwest of Silkeborg, Denmark. It is situated on a narrow peninsula which reaches into Hinge Lake and is separated from the mainland by a moat.

== History ==
The estate is first mentioned in 1442. It was known as Vinderslevgård between 1578 and 1910. The main building was most likely built for Niels Skeel (died 1561). It is 29 m (95 ft) long and has stepped gables. It was adapted both in the 19th century and in the 1910s. Most of the land was sold off in 1907.

== Today ==
Vinderslevholm was owned by Ladekjær Mikkelsen until 2008 and is now owned by Dansk Erhversprojekt A/S.

== In popular culture ==
Vinderslevholm has been featured in Den Store Bagedyst, DR1's version of The Great British Bake Off.
