= Rudbjerggaard =

Manor house in Denmark

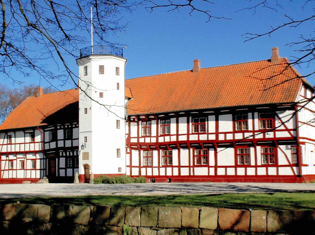
- Interactive map of the Rudbjerggaard area

General information
- Architectural style: Vernacular
- Location: Lolland, Denmark
- Coordinates: 54°46′1″N 11°7′35″E
- Construction started: C. 1600

Rudbjerggaard, situated 7 km south of Nakskov, is the only half-timbered manor house on the island of Lolland in south-eastern Denmark.

== History ==
=== Early history ===
The first known reference to Rudbjerggaard is from 1231 when it is mentioned as crown land in the Danish Census Book. The first more widely known owner of the estate was Mogens Ebbesøn, for many years the king's vassal first at Aalholm Castle and later Koldinghus. His family owned Rudbjerggaard for more than a century.

Mogens Grubbe acquired Rudbjerggaard in 1555 but already the following year sold it to Erik Rud from the manors of Fuglsang and Møgelkær. The first part of Rudbjerggaard, rud-, originally derives from the Danish for rye but is later associated with his family name.

=== Knud Rud's new house ===
Around the turn of the century, Erik Rud's son, Knud Eriksen Rud, who had taken over the house in 1502, constructed a new seat on the estate, probably completed in 1606 since that date features on the staircase tower of the main wing. Knud Rud married Ellen Marsvin on 1 January 1607 but died a few years later, in 1611, making her twice a widow at the age of 39. Before his death, Rud granted Rudbjerggaard to Marsvin's daughter by her first husband, Kirsten Munk, who would become morganatically married to the widowed King Christian IV in 1615. However, due to her young age, her mother, who was an accomplished business on the way to becoming one of the richest landowners in Denmark, managed the estate on her behalf, until selling it with the king's permission in 1616, probably due to its remote location.

Up through the century, Rudbjerggaard grew considerably, although hit hard by the Swedish Wars. Most of the complex was demolished in the 18th and 19th century but the east wing was spared and later extended in both directions to form the present building. The large staircase tower is in masonry while the rest of the building is timber-framed.

=== Reventlow era ===
In 1891, the estate was acquired by Ludvig Eduard Alexander, Count of Reventlow, born at nearby Pederstrup Manor. He died in 1916 and is interred at nearby Tillitse Church. His widow kept the estate until her death in 1938. It then passed to their son Einar Ludvig August Reventlow.

== Architecture ==
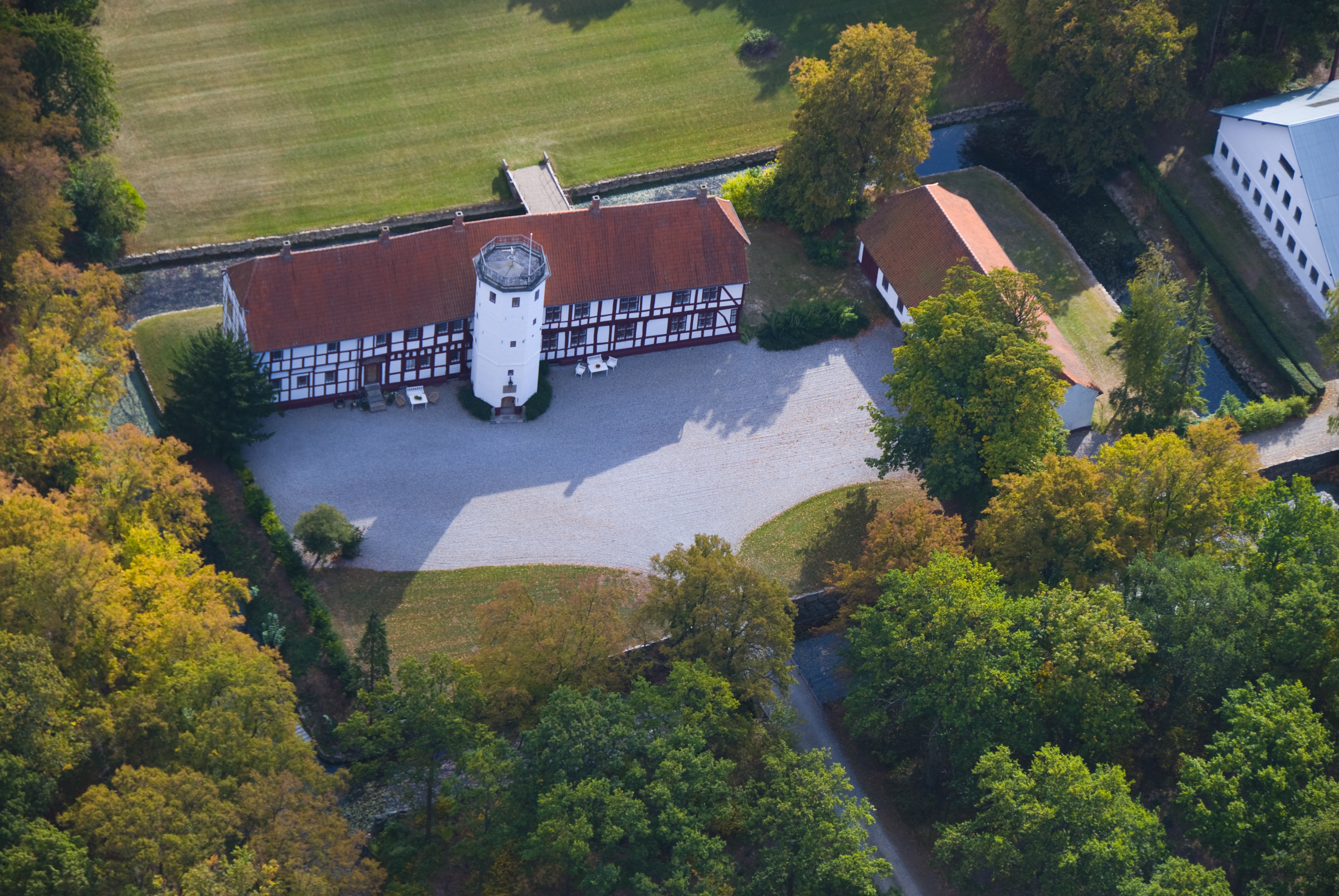
Rudbjerggaard seen from the air

The current house is the main wing of Rud's originally three- or four-winged complex from 1606. It is built in timber framing, except for the octagonal staircase tower, which is in dressed masonry. The house is still surrounded by the original moats.

== Rudbjerggaard today ==
Rudbjerggaard covers 459 hectares of farmland and 392 hectares of forest. Fredsholm covers 914 hectares of farmland and 129 hectares of forest.

== List of owners ==
- (1200-tallet) Kronen
- ( –1466) Christiern Rud
- (1466–1481) Mogens Ebbesen Galt
- (1481–1496) Dorothea Eriksdatter Rosenkrantz, gift Galt
- (1480– ) Eline Lauritzdatter Vasspyd
- (1496–1500) Erik Galt og Ebbe Galt
- (1500–1529) Anders Ebbesen Galt
- (1500–1531) Sophie Galt
- (1500–1548) Peder Andersen Galt
- (1529–1554) Ebbe Andersen Galt
- ( –1535) Laurids Madsen Vaspyd
- (1548– ) Erik Grubbe
- ( –1577) Erik Rud
- (1577– ) Jacob Rud

Ø (1577–1592) Peder Rud

- (1577–1606) Corfitz Rud
- (1577–1611) Knud Rud
- (1611–1616) Kirsten Munk
- (1616–1622) Pernille Gyldenstierne gift Rosenkrantz
- (1622–1623) Eiler Urne
- (1623–1626) Joachim von Barnewitz
- (1626–1640) Øllegaard Hartvigsdatter Pentz, married 1.) von Barnewitz og 2.) von Passow
- (1640–1653) Frederik von Barnewitz
- (1653–1674) Ide Jørgensdatter Grubbe gift von Barnewitz
- (1653–1677) Joachim von Barnewitz
- (1677–1679) Jens Rodsteen
- (1679–1692) Christian Bülow
- (1679–1719) Frederik Rodsteen
- (1679–1715) Else Magdalene Sybille Rodsteen, gift Lehsten
- (1692–1728) Frederik Barnewitz Bülow
- (1719–1723) Jens Christopher von Lehsten
- (1728–1755) Caspar Friderich von Bülow
- (1755–1757) Ida Margrethe Reventlow, gift Knuth
- (1757–1805) Conrad Ditlev Knuth
- (1805–1815) Carl Conrad Gustav Knuth
- (1815–1819) Boet efter Carl Conrad Gustav Knuth
- (1819) Simon Andersen Dons og Johan Ferdinand de Neergaard
- (1819–1823) Simon Andersen Dons
- (1823– ) Carl Conrad Gustav Knuth
- ( –1855) Carl Vilhelm Emil Knuth
- (1855–1865) Julius Gustav Berger Klemp
- (1865–1889) Michael Frederik Gustav Smith
- (1889–1891) Adolph Tesdorpf
- (1891–1916) Ludvig Eduard Alexander Reventlow
- (1916–1938) Benedicte Ulfsparre Bech, gift Reventlow
- (1938–1940) Boet efter Benedicte Ulfsparre Bech, gift Reventlow
- (1940–1978) Einar Ludvig August Reventlow
- (1978– ) Gustav Erik Reventlow von Rosen

== See also ==
- Vindeholme
