= Rønninge Søgård =

Manor house in Kerteminde Municipality, Denmark

Coordinates: 55°20′16″N 10°37′50″E

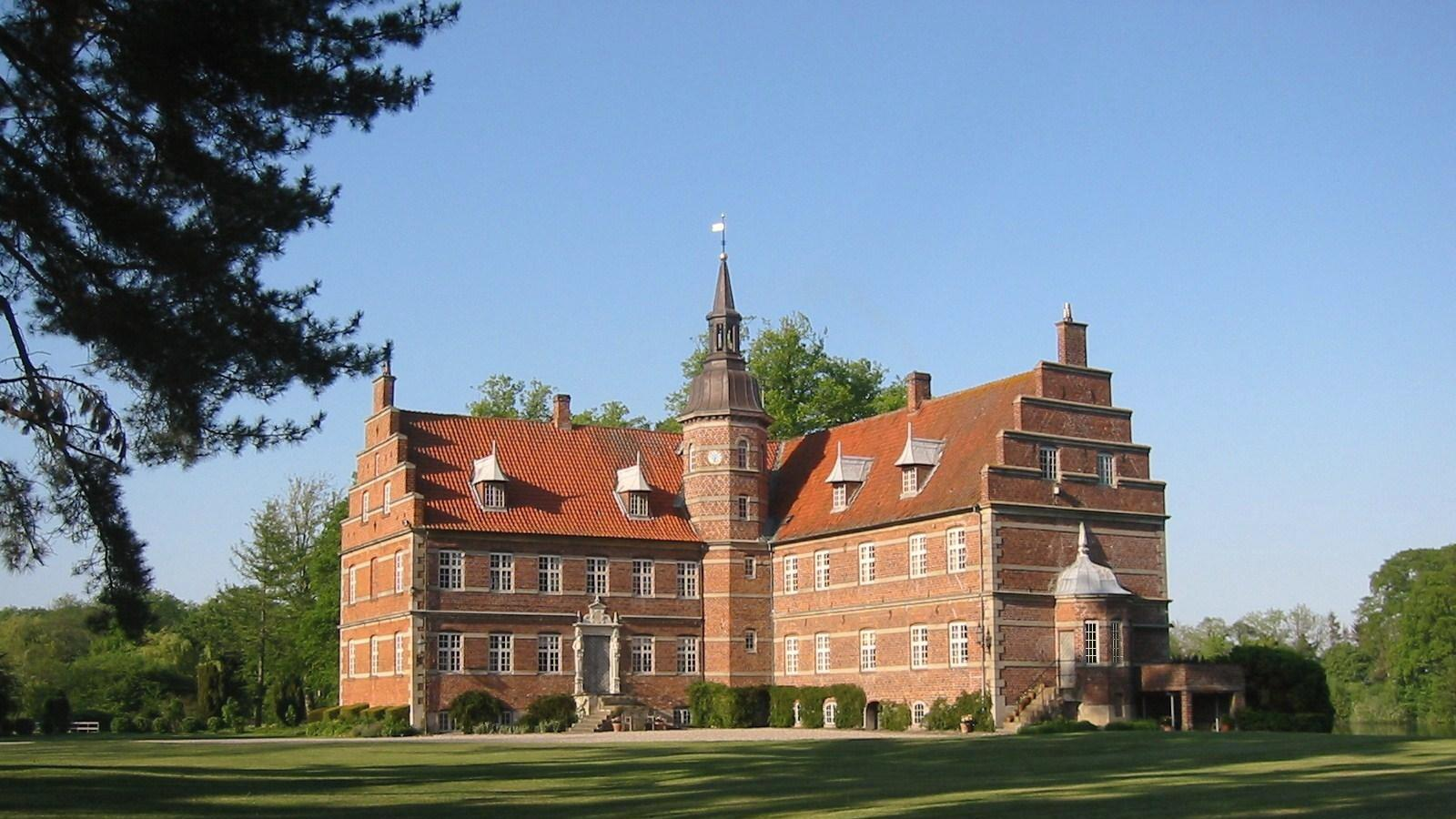
Rønninge Søgård

Rønningesøgaard, also Rønninge Søgård, is a two-winged Renaissance manor house located 12 km (7.5 mi) northwest of Nyborg on the Danish island of Funen. The east wing and the octagonal tower overlooking the waters of Vomme Sø date from 1596. The north wing was erected as a half-timbered structure in 1672 and completed in brick in 1757.

== Description ==
It has been established that in 1326 Niels Jensen was the owner of Søgård and of a series of farms in the area. He was buried in the local church. Some 200 m (660 ft) south of today's manor, there is a defensive site consisting of a hill and a moat which was apparently the first Søgard. The Crown had extensive interests in the area as Tvevad Castle, documented by Valdemar the Great, lay just 2 km to the south. The medieval castle can still be seen in Tvevadskov (Tvevad Woods).

The Søgård estate came into the Crown's ownership before the end of the 14th century. In 1537, just after the Danish Reformation, Søgård together with 16 farms is recorded as belonging to the Crown as well as two of the parish's three water mills. In 1577, Frederick II rewarded his steward Casper Markdanner with a deed for Søgård and part of the Rønninge estate. After marrying Sofie Oldeland in 1592, Markdanner set about building a presentable two-storey manor house with a vaulted cellar, commanding a fine view over the lake. The estate was also expanded although it remained a fairly modest property.

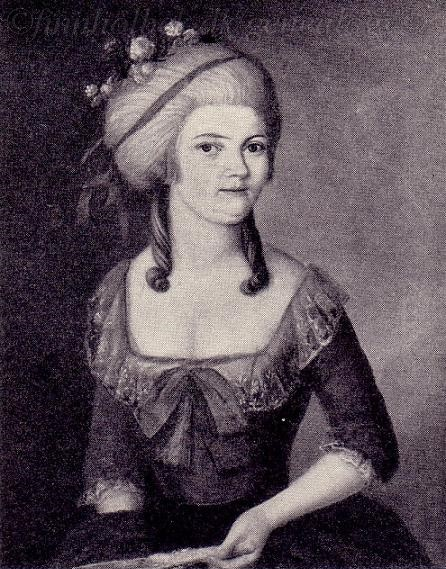
Ulrica Catharina Mylius, née Rasch

The estate remained in the hands of the Markdanner family until Frederik Markdanner, Casper's great-grandchild, died in 1677. Thereafter there were various owners. In 1757, a new wing was added in the same style as the original manor. Together with the main building, it formed an almost rectangular complex.

In 1823, Rønninge Søgård was acquired by Ulrika Cathrine de Mylius (née Rasch). After her death in 1731, it was passed to her son Johan Caspar Mylius. He was ennobled under the name de Mylius on 14 October 1840. The estate remained in the Mylius family until 1906.

In 1860, at the end of Vomme Sø, an octagonal burial chapel was built for the de Mylius's family in 1900-2018 Later it has been bought by various big farmers.

== Today ==
The estate is now owned by chamberlain, count Stig Daniel Bille-Brahe-Selby. The estate was purchased for his grandfather, Daniel, a younger son from the County of Brahesminde with the main seat at Hvedholm Castle.

== List of owners ==
- (1326-1340) Niels Jensen Rønning
- (1397) Gert Andersen Rønning
- ( -1567) Kronen
- (1567-1577) Henrik von Raaden
- (1577) Kronen
- (1577-1618) Caspar Markdanner
- (1618-1624) Frederik Markdanner
- (1624- ) Sophie Oldeland, gift Markdanner
- ( - 1639) Frederik Markdanner
- (1631-1642) Hans Markdanner
- (1639-1641) Anne Gyldenstierne, gift Markdanner
- (1641-1674) Henrik Markdanner
- (1674-1677) Frederik Markdanner
- (1677- ) Hilleborg Eriksdatter Kaas, gift 1) Markdanner, 2) Due
- ( -1684) Hans Due
- (1684-1705) Knud Sivertsen Urne
- (1705-1715) Helvig Sophie Urne, gift Friis
- (1715-1727) Christian Friis
- (1727-1728) Sigvard Urne
- (1727-1733) Christian Sehested
- (1733-1770) Johan Caspar Rasch
- (1770-1787) Mette Sophie Munck, gift Rasch
- (1788-1823) Christian Sørensen Lemwigh
- (1823-1831) Ulrika Cathrine de Mylius, née Rasch
- (1831-1840) Johan Caspar Mylius
- (1840-1857) Johan Jacob Mylius
- (1857-1885) Sigismund Wolf Veit Mylius
- (1885-1895) Albert Sigismund Caspar Mylius
- (1895-1906) Sigismund Ernst Mylius-Benzon
- (1906-1913) Oluf Bech
- (1913-1918) Preben Charles Bille-Brahe-Selby
- (1918-1950) Daniel Bille-Brahe-Selby
- (1950-1985) Bent Daniel Bille-Brahe-Selby
- (1985-2019) Stig Daniel Bille-Brahe-Selby

== Literature ==
Richardt, Joachim Ferdinand (1976). Prospekter af danske herregårde: Den fynske øgruppe og Jylland. Forum.
