= Vindeholme =

20th-century Danish mansion

Coordinates: 54.7477°N 11.1017°E

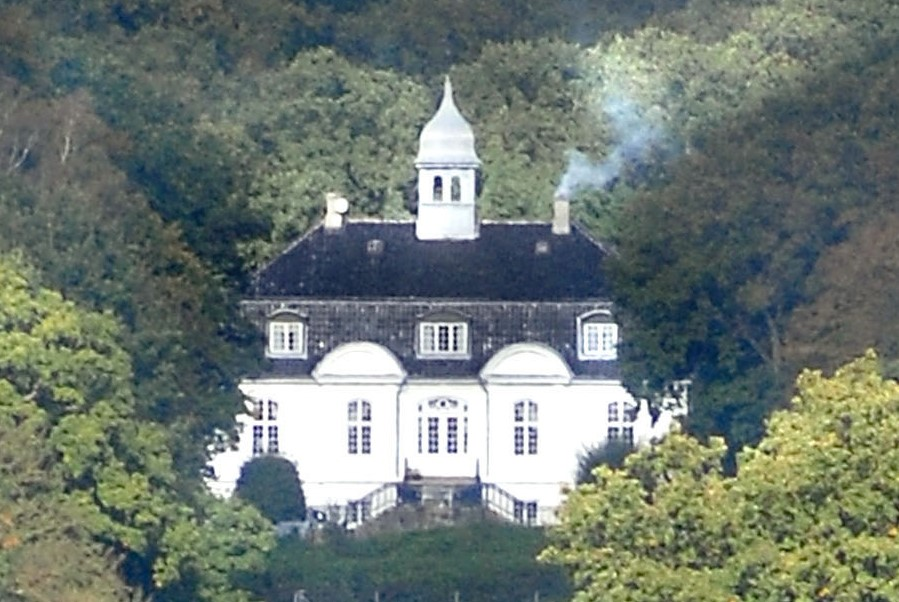
Vindeholme seen from above

Vindeholme is an early 20th-century mansion overlooking the Baltic Sea in the extreme south-western corner of Lolland, Denmark. It is now rented out as a venue for hunts, weddings and corporate events.

== History ==
Vindeholme was built by Count Ferdinand Reventlow, a Danish diplomat who sought a place to retire after a long career abroad, most recently as Danish Ambassador to Paris. He acquired the land from his brother, Count Ludvig Reventlow, who had acquired Rudbjerggaard manor in 1891. Set amid forests of small-leaved linden trees, the house was completed in 1911 to a design by architect H. C. Amberg, most known for his restoration work at Ribe Cathedral and St. Nicolas' Church in Copenhagen.

== Vindeholme today ==
The current owners of Rugbjerggaard restored the house in 2004 and it is now being rented out for smaller conferences, hunts, corporate events and private celebrations. The estate covers 298 hectares of land.

== Owners ==
- (1910-1928) Ferdinand Einar Julius Gottlieb greve Reventlow
- (1928-1973) Frederik Detlef Carl greve Reventlow
- (1973-1978) Einar Ludvig August greve Reventlow
- (1978-) Gustav Erik von Rosen
