= Neergaard (noble family) =

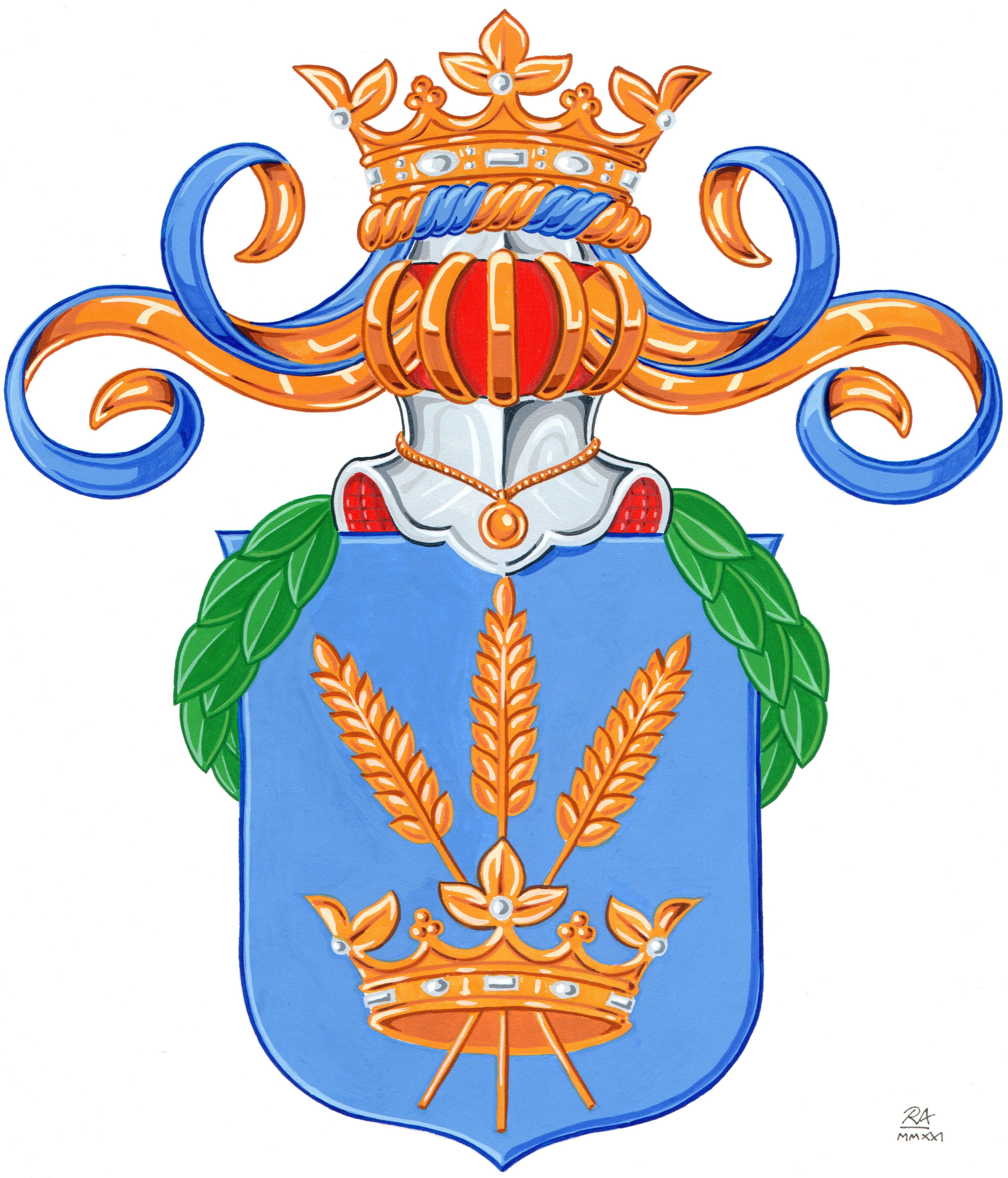

The de Neergaard family is a Danish noble family descended from War Councillor Peter Johansen Neergaard, whose two sons Jens Bruun de Neergaard (1742–1788) and Johan Thomas de Neergaard (1745–1806) were ennobled on 31 May 1780. Descendants of Jens Bruun de Neergaard are referred to as the 'elder branch', whereas descendants of Johan Thomas de Neergaard are referred to as the 'younger branch'.

Members of the de Neergaard family have been major landowners for generations.

== The elder branch ==
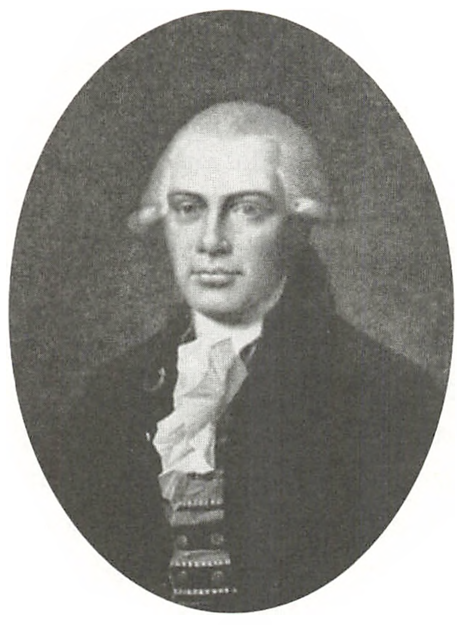
Jens Bruun Neergaard (1742–1788)

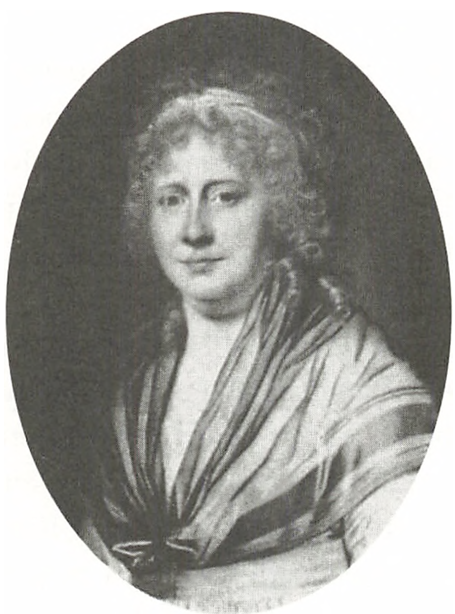
Ane Marie Neergaard (née Møller, 1743–1802)

Jens Bruun de Neergaard inherited Svenstrup from his father in 1763. He married Ane Marie Møller (23 March 1743–23 October 1802). They had four children:

- Jens Peter Bruun de Neergaard (7 December 1764–7 January 1842)
- Johan Andreas Bruun de Neergaard (4 August 1770–2 July 1846)
- Tønnes Christian Bruun de Neergaard (26 November 1776–14 January 1824)
- Ellen Cathrine Kirstine Bruun de Neergaard (19 September 1777–19 July 1845)

== The younger branch ==
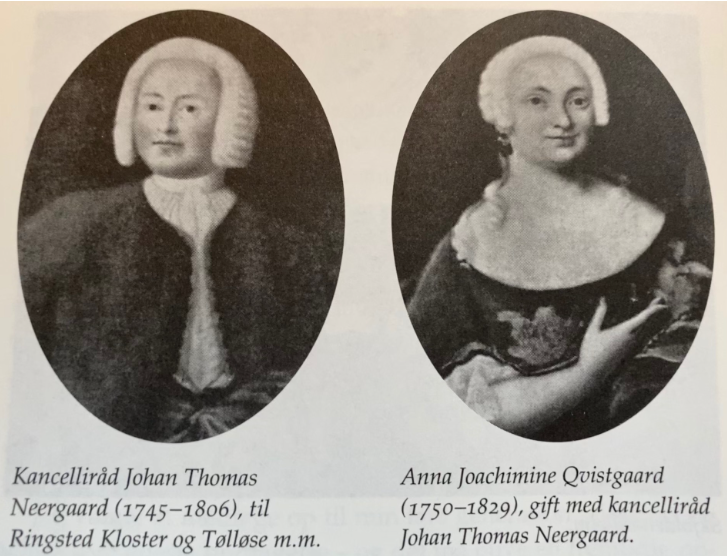
Johan Thomas de Neergaard and Anna Joachimine Qvistgaard.

Johan Thomas Neergaard inherited Ringsted Abbey. He married Anna Joachimine Qvistgaard (27 August 1750–5 January 1829). They had 11 children:

- Peter Johansen de Neergaard (24 July 1769–9 January 1835)
- Marie de Neergaard (January 1770–?)
- Lucia Kirstine de Neergaard (5 February 1773–9 November 1817)
- Jørgen de Neergaard (29 July 1775–27 February 1795)
- Johan Michael de Neergaard (16 November 1776–26 July 1783)
- Jacob de Neergaard (24 April 1778–19 October 1833)
- Johanne Birgitte de Neergaard (1780–1790)
- Mette Dorothea de Neergaard (1781–1782)
- Johan Michael de Neergaard (11 January 1784–9 August 1837)
- Marie Christine Jacobæa Elisabeth de Neergaard (19 December 1789–21 August 1859)
- Johanne (Hanne) Birgitte Mette Dorothea de Neergaard (29 March 1792–5 June 1824)

== Insignia ==
The family's coat of arms features three ears of wheat penetrating a golden crown on a blue shield on which a laurel wreath is casually arranged; above the shield a helmet with a golden crown resting a braided wreath in blue and gold.

== Landownership ==
Estates that are currently owned by the de Neergaard family include:

- Svenstrup (since 1751)
- Skjoldenæsholm (since 1794)
- Gunderslevholm (since 1803)
- Førslevgaard (since 1803)
- Castrup (since 1805)
- Gyldenholm (since 1862)
- Valdemarskilde (since 1907)
- Vindumovergaard (since 1943)
- Løvegaard (since 1963)
- Vinstrupgaard (since 2005)
- Gislingegaard (since 2025)

Estates that have been owned by the de Neergaard family for longer include:

- Fuglebjerggaard (1721–1724, 1805–2005)
- Kærup (1741–1804)
- Ringsted Abbey (1741–1804)
- Merløsegaard (1763–1807)
- Fuglsang (1819–1947)
- Priorskov (1819–1947)
- Vivebrogaard (1829–1863)
- Faarevejle (1842–1924)
- Charlottedal (1847–1969)
- Aunsbjerg (1853–1990)
- Estvadgaard (1871–1923)

Estates that have been owned by the de Neergaard family for longer include:

- Grevensvænge (1725–1742)
- Alslevgaard (1747–1751)
- Tryggevælde (1747–1751)
- Eskilstrup (1751–1755)
- Tølløsegaard (1768–1788)
- Sonnerupgaard (1788–1793)
- Bonderup (1796–1803)
- Fodbygaard (1803)
- Egensekloster (1803–1813, 1826–1830)
- Høstemark (1804–1813)
- Tybjerggaard (1804–1833)
- Bjørnemose (1811–1812)
- Nørlund (1812, 1826–1830)
- Store Restrup (1812–1823)
- Vedbygaard (1818–1844)
- Torstedlund (1820–1830)
- Trøjborg (1830–1851)
- Julianeholm (1838–1853)
- Meilgaard (1840–1845)
- Steensbygaard (1897–1906)
- Taarnborg (1904–1922)
- Hjortholm (1928–1932)
- Skelstofte (1931–1939)

== Notable family members ==
- Beate de Neergaard, f. Højbjerg Pedersen (1904–1982) – painter
- Carl de Neergaard (1800–1850) – politician and owner of Gunderslevholm and Castrup
- Carl de Neergaard (1873–1956) – owner of Gyldenholm and Castrup
- Charles Adolph Denis de Neergaard (1839–1903) – owner of Gyldenholm and Castrup
- Christoffer Johan Thomas de Neergaard (1994–) – lawyer, owner of Gunderslevholm and Castrup
- Claus Johan Thomas de Neergaard (1958–) – chamberlain, owner of Gunderslevholm, Castrup, and Vinstrupgaard
- Ebbe de Neergaard (1901–1957) – director of Statens Filmcentral
- Ebbe Flach de Neergaard (1865–1950) – master of the hunt
- Edvard de Neergaard (1855–1925) – landowner
- Eigil Bruno Wendell de Neergaard (1913–1945) – resistance fighter
- Eigil de Neergaard – sergeant in 12th Light Horse Brigade
- Ellen Bodil de Neergaard, f. Hartmann (1867–1959) – landowner and philanthropist
- Erik Bruun de Neergaard (1918–2002) – judge and politician, Member of Parliament
- Ferdinand Lorenz de Neergaard (1873–1938) – owner of Gunderslevholm
- Henri Bruun de Neergaard (1876–1935) – master of the hunt
- Holger Flach de Neergaard (1868–1958) – engineer and politician
- Holger Flach de Neergaard (1922–) – director
- Jacob Flach de Neergaard (1891–1932) – Valet de Chambre and landowner
- Jacobine de Neergaard (1862–1967) – dowager master of the hunt
- Jens Bruun de Neergaard (1742–1788) – landowner
- Jesper de Neergaard (1939–) – sculptor
- Joachim Bruun de Neergaard (1877–1920) – composer
- Johan Andreas Bruun de Neergaard (1770–1846) – landowner, officer, and chamberlain
- Johan Ferdinand de Neergaard (1796–1849) – chamberlain and county governor
- Johan Nicolaj Flach de Neergaard (1950–) – chamberlain and owner of Førslevgaard
- Johan Thomas Oluf de Neergaard (1834–1921) – councillor of state, chamberlain, and owner of Gunderslevholm
- Lone de Neergaard, f. Carlsson (1946–) – chief planner, senior medical doctor in Sundhedsstyrelsen
- Lucius Carl Joseph Andreas Bruun de Neergaard (1797–1881) – landowner and German politician
- Marie de Neergaard (1899–1976) – chamberlain's wife
- Marie Louise Flach de Neergaard – head of unit
- Peter Christian Joachim Bruun de Neergaard (1806–1893) – landowner and politician
- Peter Johansen de Neergaard (1769–1835) – owner of Gunderslevholm and others
- Peter Johansen de Neergaard (1864–1940) – landowner
- Peter Johansen Neergaard (1702–1772) – owner of Ringsted Abbey and others
- Poul Bruun de Neergaard (1851–1932) – master of the hunt
- Preben de Neergaard (1920–1990) – actor and film director
- Rolf Viggo de Neergaard (1837–1915) – landowner
- Rolf Viggo de Neergaard (1927–2021) – owner of Gunderslevholm and Castrup
- Tønnes Christian Bruun de Neergaard (1776–1824) – landowner, art collector, and patron
- Ulla Bøegh de Neergaard, f. Henriksen (1963–) – professor in EU law, University of Copenhagen
- Viggo de Neergaard (1881–1965) – owner of Valdemarskilde and Charlottedal
- Vilhelm Bruun de Neergaard (1846–1912) – chamberlain and master of the hunt
- Vilhelm Bruun de Neergaard (1934–2001) – owner of Skjoldenæsholm
- Vilhelm de Neergaard (1858–1912) – forester
- Wenzel Carl Peter Frederik Flach de Neergaard (1864–1919) – politician
- Wenzel de Neergaard (1892–1968) – landowner and photographer

== Sources ==
- Albert Fabritius, "Neergaard", i: Povl Engelstoft & Svend Dahl (red.), Dansk Biografisk * Leksikon, København: J.H. Schultz Forlag 1932–1944
- Danmarks Adels Aarbog, XXXII, 1915, pages 336–376; XL, 1923, page 557
- Slægtstavlesamlingen, 1931, page 127
- Theodor Hauch-Fausbøll i Berlingske Tidende, 26 February 1932
- Foreningen af den gunderslevholmske gren af slægten Neergaard
- Gunderslevholm
- Lex: Neergaard
- Rolf Viggo de Neergaard: En slægts historie
