= Johan Ferdinand de Neergaard =

Danish government official (1796–1849)

Johan Ferdinand Neergaard (3 August 1796 – 10 April 1849) was a Danish government official and landowner. He owned Fuglsang Manor and Priorskov on Lolland and Trøjborg Castle in Sønderjylland.

== Early life and education ==
Neergaard was born on 3 August 1796 at Ringsted Abbey, the son of Peter Johansen de Neergaard and Elisabeth Jacobine Vilhelmin Mourier. He was the elder brother of Carl Neergaard. He matriculated from Herlufsholm School in 1814 and earned a law degree from the University of Copenhagen in 1818.

== Career ==
In 1820, Neergaard was employed as an assistant in Rentekammeret. In 1827, he was appointed county governor of Ringkøbing County. During his years in western Jutland, his official residence was at Rindomgård. On 11 February 1937. He was appointed county governor of Prlstø County. During his years as county governor of Præstø County, his official residence was at Lindersvold. For a while, while Lindersvold's main building was being refurbished, he resided in rented premises at Nysø Manor.

On 30 January 1833, he was made a member of Roskilde Constituent Assembly (Østifternes Stænderforsamling i Eokilde) by royal appointment. In 18141, he was elected for the assembly (not by royal appointment). On 28 June 1931, he was created a chamberlain.

== Personal life ==
On 23 August 1830, he married Charlotte Louise Elisabeth Olsen (1808–66). She was the daughter of military prosecutor (Generalauditør) Ulrik Christian Olsen and Henriette Zinn.

He owned Fuglsang Manor and Priorskov on Lolland. In the same year, Neergaard bought Trøjborg Castle at Rønder. In 1842, he replaced Fuglsang's main building with a modest new house.

He died on 10 April 1849. He is buried at Gammelholm, an old castle bank just north of Fuglsang's main building.

Some time after Louise Neergaard had become a widow, probably in around 1852, she purchased the county house Olufshøj in Søllerød, north of Copenhagen. The property had belonged to her father. Her city home was an apartment at Amaliegade 7.

Johan Ferdinand Neergaard and his wife were the parents of six children:

- Carl Peter Ulrich de Neergaard (1831–1863)
- Johan Thomas Oluf de Neergaard (1834–1921), married to Anna Maria Elisabeth Antoinette Castenschiold
- Anna Henriette Elisabeth de Neergaard (1835–1891), married to Ole Christian Kahrs
- Rolf Viggo de Neergaard(1837–1915), married to Bodil Neergaard, inherited Fuglsang Manor and Priorskov
- Louise Oline Julie Charlotte de Neergaard (1840–1900), narried Frederikm Count Ahlefeldt-Laurvigen (1834-1888)
- Johanne Marie Lucie de Neergaard (1841–1932), married

Civic offices
Preceded by Vilhelm Conrad Lorentz	County governor of Ringkøbing; 1827–1837	Succeeded by Fredrik (Ferdinand Tillisch)
Preceded by Hans Schack Knuth	County governor of Holbæk; 1837–1748	Succeeded by P. C. F. Brun
