= Christian Ludvig von Plessen =

Danish statesman and landowner

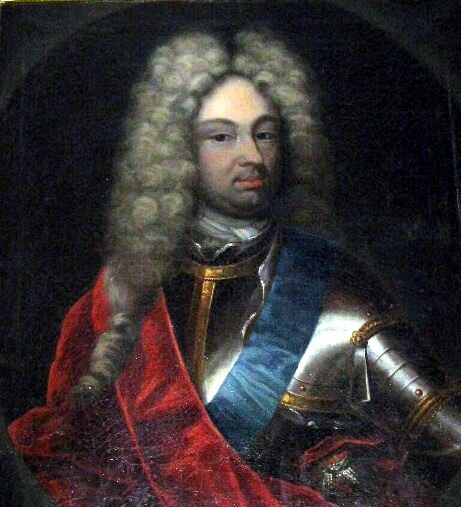
Christian Ludvig Plessen.

Christian Ludvig von Plessen (10 December 1676 – 30 August 1752) was a Danish statesman and landowner. He served as Minister of Finance and Trade during the early reign of Christian VI. Both he and his brother Carl Adolph von Plessen fell out of favour at the Danish court in 1734. He was a co-founder, major shareholder and the first president of the Danish Asiatic Company and also a major shareholder of the Danish West Indies Company. His holdings included Fussingø in Jutland, Glorup on Funen and Selsø on Zealand.

== Early life and education ==
Plessen was born in Mecklenburg, the son of hofmeister Christian Siegfried von Plessen (1646–1723) and Sophia Agnes von Lepel (c. 1650–1684). He studied at the university in Utrecht.

== Career ==
Plessen started his career as page (kammerjunker) to Prince William. From 1702 to 1725, he served as diocesan governor of Aarhus as well as county governor of Aarhusgaard and Stjernholm counties.

In 1725, he was made a member of the Gehejmekonseil. In 1720, he was awarded the title of gehejmeråd. The government was dominated by queen Anne Sophie's party. This left Plessen, who belonged to the opposition, with little influence on the prevailing policies of the time.

After Christian VI's ascent to the throme, in 1730, Plessen was appointed Minister of Finance and Trade (generaldirektør for finanserne og kommercevæsenet). In 1734, when Johan Sigismund Schulin was put in charge of a new government, Plessen was dismissed as finance minister. After Christian VI's death, Plessen and his brother unsuccessfully tried to make a comeback.

Plessen was a co-founder and major shareholder of the Danish Asiatic Company. He was also appointed as the first president of the company (replaced by count Johan Sigismund Schulin in 1832). He was also a major shareholder in the Danish West Indies Company.

== Personal life ==
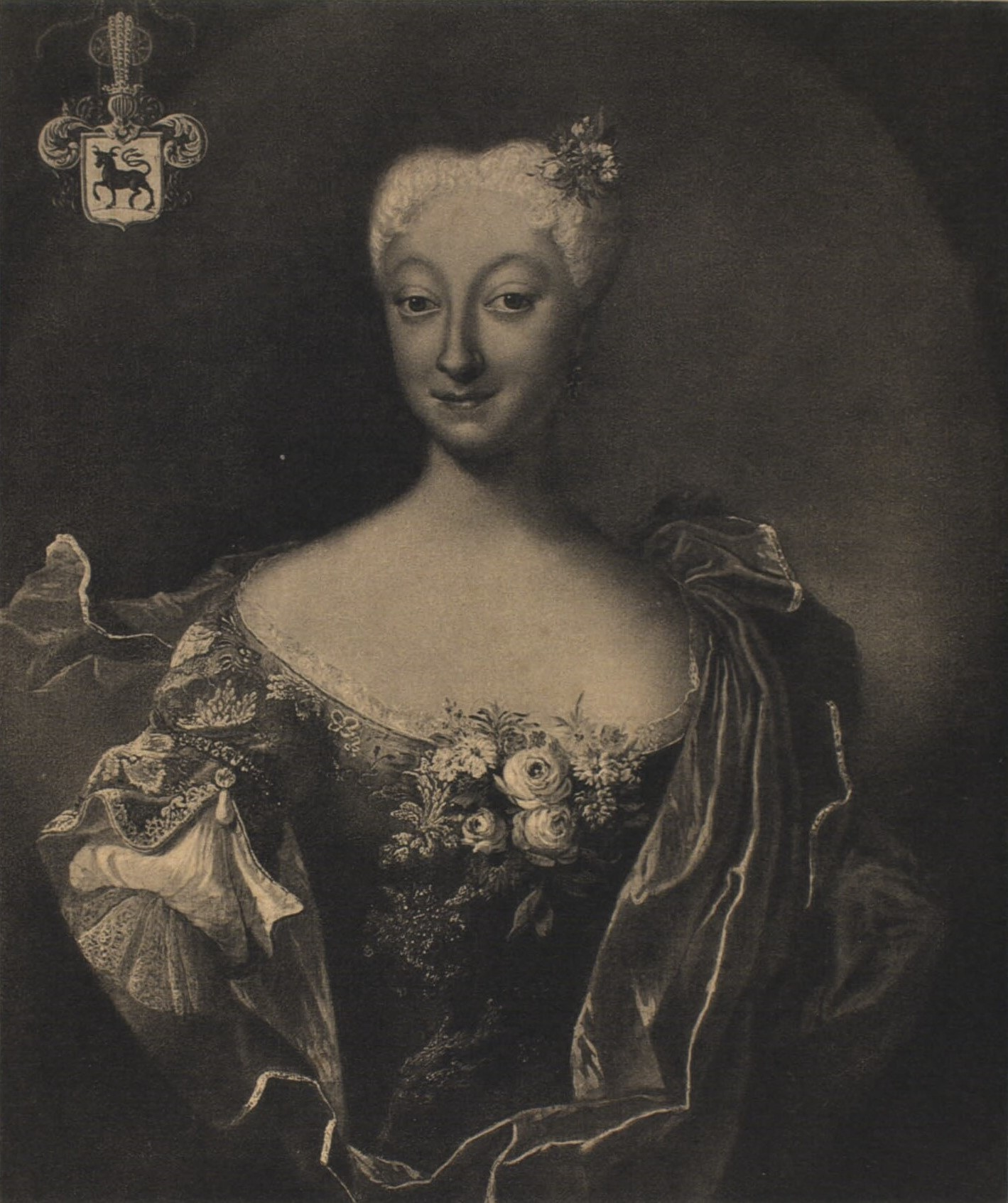
Charlotte Amalie von Plessen.

On 8 January 1702, Plessen married to Charlotte Amalie Skeel (1685–1729). She was the daughter of diocesan governor Mogens Skeel til Fussingø (1650–94) and Helle H. Rosenkrantz (1658–98). Plessen and his wife had 17 children of which eight died as infants.

Through his marriage, in 1702, Plessen came into possession of Fussingø, Odden (including Stensbæk) and Holbækgård. Fussingø and Holbækgaard were both entailed estates, so-called stamhuse, established by his wife's father Mogens Skeel and aunt Berte Skeel, respectively. In 1712, he inherited Glorup. on Funen from his own father.

In 1720, Plessen received Selsø, Torpegård and Eskilsø as another endowment from Berte Skeel. In 1728, he expanded his holdings near Roskilde by also acquiring Lindholm. In 1733, he also inherited Salzau in Holstein. In 1820, he ceded Stamhuset Fussingø to his eldest son, Mogens Scheel von Plessen (1713–1749), who was married to Elisabeth Christine von Thienen (1715–1788). After the son's early death, three years prior to that of his father, Stamhuset Fussingø was passed to the grandson Christian Ludvig Scheel von Plessen.

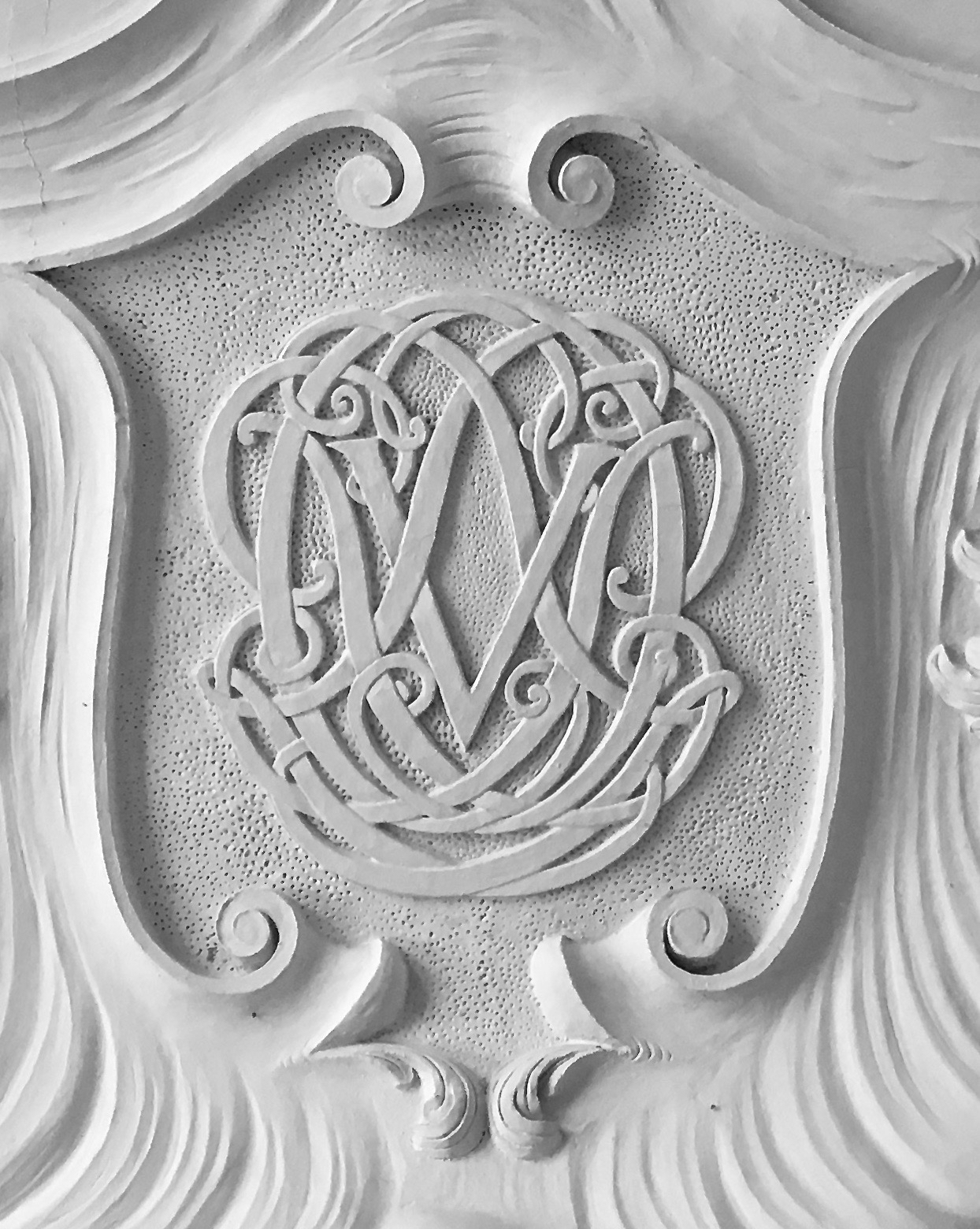
Christian Ludvig Plessen's monogram at Selsø.

Plessen died on 30 August 1752. His and his wife's marble sarcofages stand in the tower of Ølum Church at Randers.

After Plessen's death, Stamhuset Selsø was also passed to the grandson Christian Ludvig Scheel von Plessen. Glorup was passed to Plessen's second-eldest son, Christian Siegfred von Plessen (1716–1755), who was married to Louise von seBerckentin (1725–1799). He died without issue just three years later. The third son, Frederik Christian Scheel von Plessen. who was married to Birgitte Rosenkrantz (1723–1763). did not leave any issue either. The eldest daughter Berte von Plessen (Scheel von Plessen) (1707–1786) was married to Christian Frederik Raben til Bremersvold, Aalholm (1693–1773). The second-eldest daughter Eleonore Hedevig Scheel von Plessen (1708–1770) was married to Christian Rantzau (1684–1771). The third daughter Charlotte Louise von Plessen (1720–1801) was married to count Jørgen greve Scheel (1718–1786). The fourth daughter Charlotte Dorothea Scheel von Plessen (1724–1771) was married to Claus Reventlow (1693–1758).

== Awards ==
In 1713, Plessen was created a White Knight. In 1828, he was created a Vlue Knight. In 1732, he was awarded the Ordre de l'Union Parfaite.
