= Carl Neergaard =

Danish landowner

Carl de Neergaard
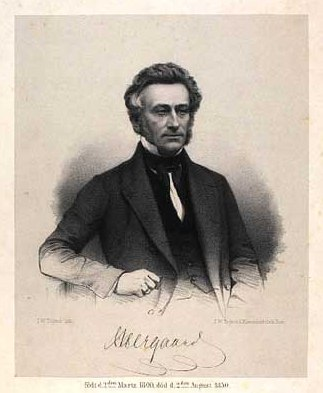
- Neergaard by I.W. Tegner & Kittendorff
- Born: 2 March 1800; Ringsted Abbey, Denmark
- Died: 2 August 1850 (aged 50); Ems, Germany
- Occupations: Landowner and politician
- Known for: 1848 Danish Constituent Assembly
- Awards: Order of the Dannebrog

Carl (de) Neergaard (2 March 1800 – 2 August 1850) was a Danish landowner and politician. He was the owner of Gunderslevholm and Kastrup on central Zealand. He was a member of the 1848 Danish Constituent Assembly.

== Early life ==
Neergaard was born on 2 March 1800 at Ringsted Abbey, the second son of Peter Johansen Neergaard (1769–1835) and Elisabeth J. Von Mourier (1778–1813). He graduated from Roskilde Cathedral School in 1819.

== Landowner and local politician ==
Neergaard began his career as a farmer as manager of Fuglsang and Priorskov manors on Lolland under the guidance of Johan Ditlev Friderichsen. From 1826 to 1830, he was the owner of Nørlund and Torstedlund.

Neergaard received Gunderslevholm and Kastrupgaard on central Zealand when his father divided his estates between his three surviving sons in 1835. He was also given the extensive woodland areas that had until then belonged to the Antvorskov and Gyldenholm estates after his father. Jens Banzon Andersen worked with cattle breeding for him on the Gunderslevholm estate. In 1847, Neergaard also purchased Charlottendal.

Neergaard was active in a number of agricultural organisations, including Landhusholdningsselskabet. He was a co-founder of Sorø Amts Landøkonomiske Selskab in 1833 and served first as its vice president and from1845 as its president. He was also a member of Sorø County Council from 1842.

== National politics ==
Neergaard was a member of Roskilde Provincial Assembly from 1834 to 1848 as a moderately conservative representative of the estate owners. He was in opposition to J. C. Drewsen and Balthazar Christensen during the great agricultural debate of 1844.

He was also a member of the 1848 Danish Constituent Assembly (representing Slagelse). He was a member of the Agricultural Commission (landbokommissionen) of 1849 and was elected for the first Landsting in the 2nd Constituency (North Zealand).

== Personal life ==
Neergaard married Elisabeth Arnoldine de Fine Mourier (1811–1883), daughter of landowner Charles Adolph Denys Mourier (1776–1859) and Johanne Susanne Skibsted (1780–1864), on 26 October 1832 at Hindemae. The couple had no children.

Neergaard died on 2 August 1850 and was buried in Gunderslev Cemetery. His eldest brother's children drew lots for his estates. Gunderslevholm went to Johan Thomas Oluf de Neergaard and Kastrup went to Charles Adolf Denis de Neergaard.
