= Christian Siegfried von Plessen =

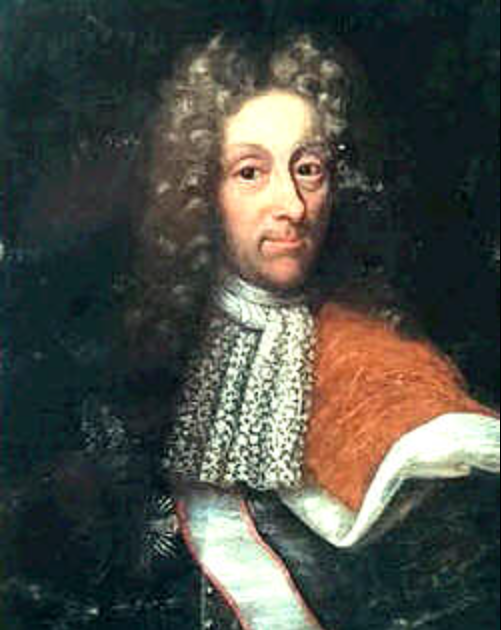
Christian Siegfried von Plessen.

Christian Siegfried von Plessen (1646 – January 22, 1723) was a German-Danish statesman and diplomat who served as president of Rentekammeret during the reign of Christian V. After Frederick IV's ascent to the throne, he lost his influence at the Danish court. In 1703, he moved to Hamburg. He was the father of Carl Adolph von Plessen and Christian Ludvig von Plessen.

== Early life and education ==
Plessen was born in 1646 as the son of hofmeister Daniel von Plessen zu Hoikendorf (1606–1672) and Dorothea Eleonora von Blumenthal (died 1687). He received a thorough education. Most of his Grand Tour was spent in France.

== Career ==
In 1670, Plessen began working for the government in Schwerin. When his brother, Carl Adolph Plessen, who had enlisted in the Danish army, was killed in battle during the Siege of Malmö in 1677, Plessen went to Copenhagen to sort out his affairs. After being introduced at the Danish court, he soon won the confidence of queen dowager Sophie Amalie and Prince George. At the queen dowager's initiative, he was appointed squire (kammerjunker) and chief clerk (overkæmmerer) at Prince George's court. In March 1678, he was given full responsibility for managing Prince George's finances and was also appointed county governor of Vordingborg and Jungshoved counties. In 1681, when Prince George was engaged, he followed him to England. In 1684, leading circles at the British court, who perceived Plessen's great influence on the prince as a hazard, arranged for him to be sent back to Denmark.

Plessen remained in charge of the management of Prince George's Danish holdings. In 1690, Christian V put him in charge of implementing administrative and financial reforms. In 1692, he was appointed president of the Rentekammeret. At the same time, he was also made a member of the Gehejmekonseil.

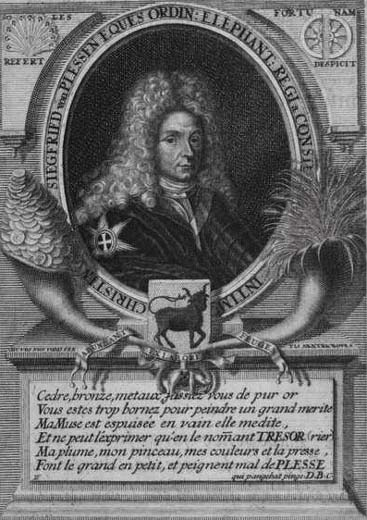
Christian Siegfried von Plessen.

In 1689, Plessen represented Denmark-Norway at the coronation of William II, Prince of Orange. In relation to Danish foreign policies, together with Christian von Lente and Robert Molesworth, he worked for an alliance with England. This resulted in a conflict with T. B. von Jessen and Conrad Reventlow, both of whom wanted to remain in the alliance with France. In 1695 and 1696, he represented Denmark when two treaties were concluded with England and the Netherlands, resulting in Denmark joining the Grand Alliance.

After Frederick IV's ascent to the throne in 1699, Plessen lost his position at the Danish court. In January 1700, he thus had to resign as president of the Kammerkollegium. He kept his seat in the Geheoimekonceil and also remained involved in commissions and on diplomatic missions.

In 1703, Plessen was accused of being involved in the murder of Hans von Schade, the Polish envoy in Copenhagen. The accusations were apparently unfounded. Further investigations were abandoned after diplomatic pressure from England, but Plessen had to give up his remaining government posts. He was also replaced as county governor of Møn and patron of the Knight's Academy in Copenhagen. In 1704, he moved to Hamburg. He was still used by the Danish government for diplomatic missions to the Netherlands and England. Prince George died in his arms in London in 1708. Plessen remained county governor of Vordingborg until 1710 and Jungshoved until 1814.

== Property ==
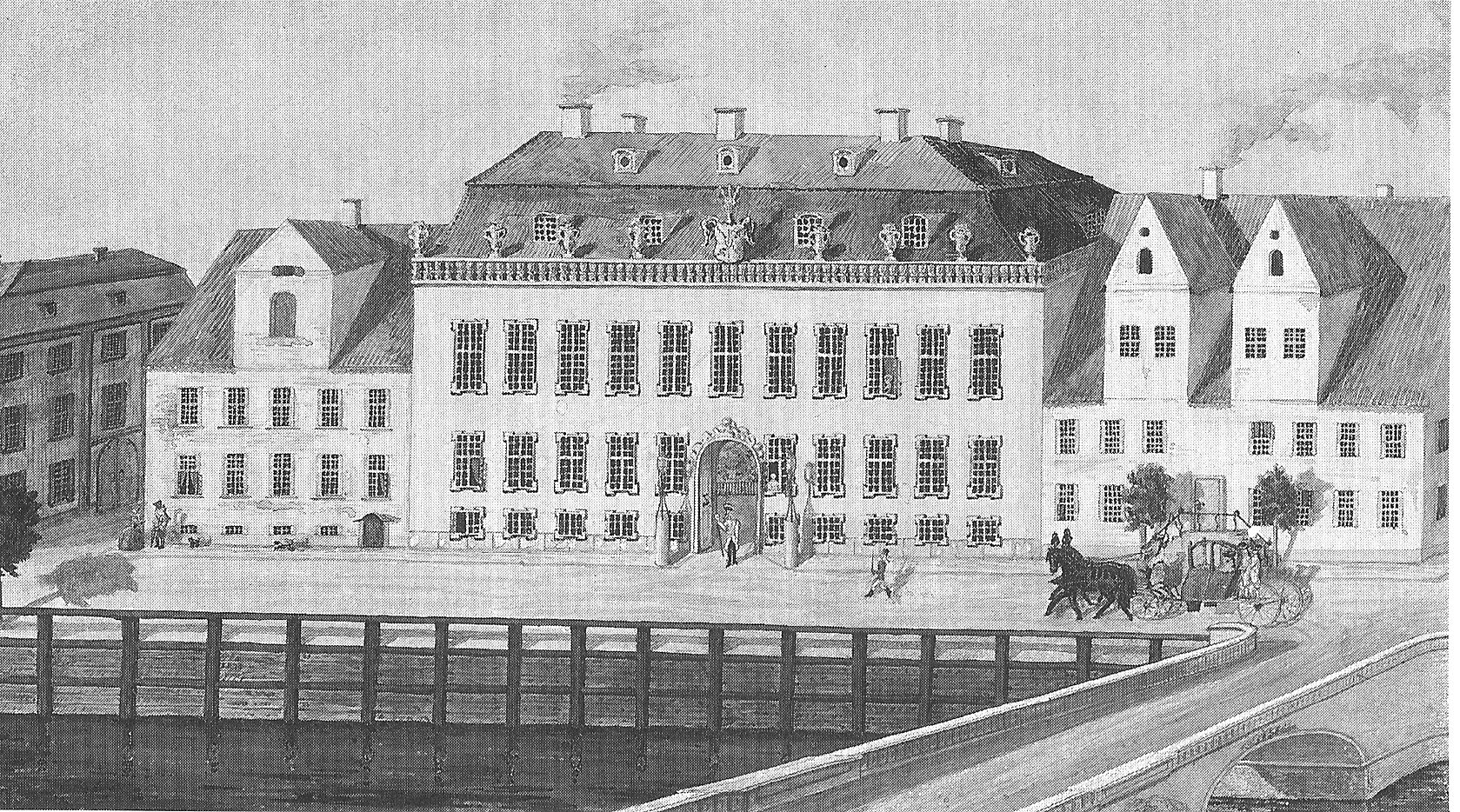
The Plessen Mansion.

Plessen inherited Hoikendorf and Manderow from his father. He later increased his Mecklenburg holdings by also acquiring the estates Harckensee (1687), Parin (1689), Rolofhagen, Küssow and Gütow (1689–1708). In 1707, he bought Vallø (with Billesborg and Gunderup) from his son-in-law Christen Skeel. In 1709, he sold Vallø for 165,000 Danish rigsdaler to Frederick IV. In 1705, Anna Ahlefeldt (née Rumohr) endowed Glorup to him, which he then acquired in 1712.

Plessen's city home in Copenhagen was the Plessen Mansion on Frederiksholms Kanal.

== Personal life ==
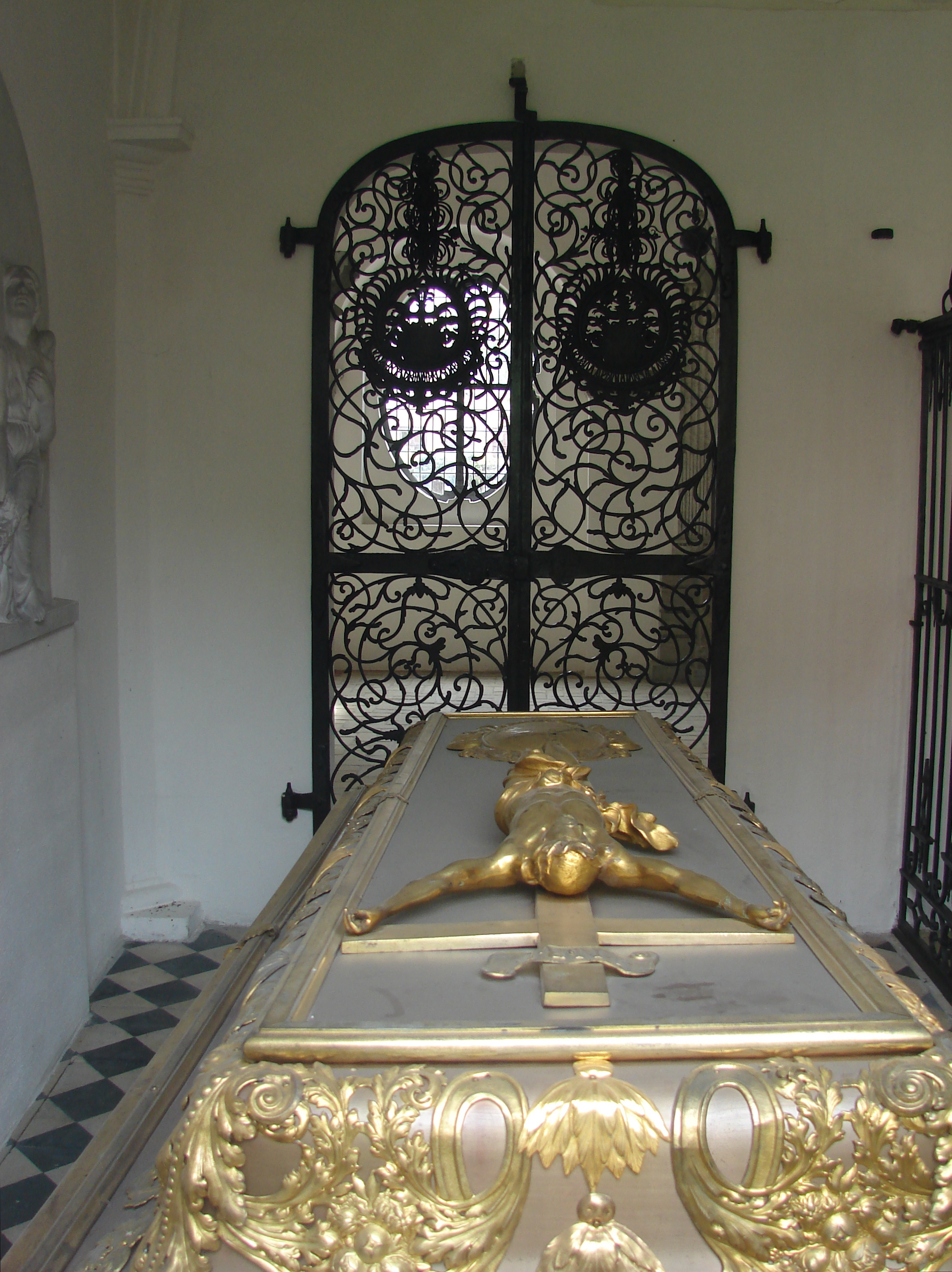
Plessen's sarcofagus in St. Peter's Church in Copenhagen.

Plessen was married three times. In 1673, he married Sophia Agnes von Lepel (c. 1650–1684). She was the daughter of Claus von Lepel and Dorothea von Wopersnow. In 1685, Plessen married secondly to Clara Eleonora Bülow (1665–1689), daughter of army officer Barthold Bülow til Scharbow (1620–1694) and Joachimine Dorothea von Spörken (1637–1665). He and Clara Eleonora had two daughters. While he was attending William II's coronation, Plessen was informed that his wife and their youngest daughter had died in the fire of Sophie Amalienborg.

In 1692, he married Magdalena Hedewig von Halberstadt (1656–1702). She was a daughter of major-general Gebhardt von Halberstadt til Langenbrück (1621–1692) and Hedewig Clara von Thun (1620–1690).

Plessen died on January 22, 1723 in Hamburg. He is buried in St. Peter's Church in Copenhagen. Their daughter, Charlotte Amalie von Plessen (1683–1760), later married Christen Ottesen Skeel (1663–1709).

Plessen was survived by three sons and a daughter. His eldest son, Christian Ludvig Scheel von Plessen, succeeded his father as owner of Glotup Manor. His second-eldest son, Carl Adolph von Plessen, was a central figure at Christian VI's court and a major landowner. Their half-sister Charlotte Amalie von Plessen (1683–1760) was married to Christen Ottesen Skeel (1663–1709). His youngest son, Christian Sigfred von Plessen (1696–1777), owned the estates Næsbyholm and Bavelse.

Civic offices
Preceded by Franke Meinertsen	County Governor of Vordingborg County; 1680–1698	Succeeded by Otto Krabbe
Preceded by Franke Meinertsen	County Governor of JungshovedCounty; 1680–1698	Succeeded by Otto Krabbe
Preceded by Samuel Christof, von Plessen	County Governor of MønCounty; 1697–1703	Succeeded by Caspar Gottlob Moltke
