= Peter Johansen Neergaard =

Danish landowner (1769–1835)

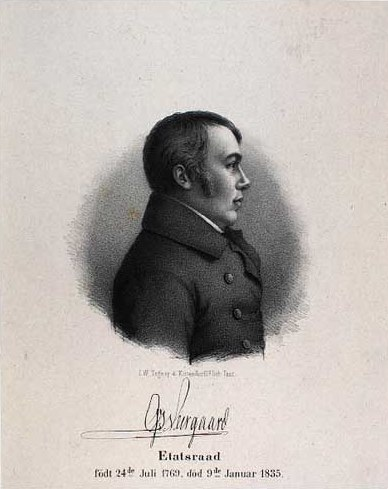
- Posthumous lithography by I.W. Tegner & Kittendorff
- Born: 24 July 1769; Tølløsegård, Denmark
- Died: 9 January 1835 (aged 65); Copenhagen, Denmark
- Occupation: Landowner

Peter Johansen (de) Neergaard (24 July 1769 – 9 January 1835) was a Danish landowner. He was one of the largest landowners of his time in Denmark. His father was ennobled under the name de Neergaard in 1780.

== Early life ==
Neergaard was born at Tølløsegård, the eldest son of kancelliråd Johan Thomas Neergaard and Anna Joachimine Qvistgaard (1750–1829). His father was ennobled by letters patent in 1780. Neergaard graduated in law from the University of Copenhagen in 1790 .

== Property ==
Peter Johansen Neergaard was the owner of the estates Ringsted Abbey, Kærup (1793–1804), Merløsegaard (1795–1796), Gyldenholm (1810–1812), Førslev (1803–1830), Gunderslevholm (1803–1835), Kastrup, Fuglebjerggaard and Fodbygård (1803), Det Plessenske fideikommis (1803), Gerdrup (1814–1831), Lyngbygård (1814–1831), Fuglsang (1819–1835), Priorskov (1819–1835), Nørlund, Torstedlund (1820–1826) and Albæk (1812).

He was a co-founder of the Store Larsbjørnsstræde Sugar Refinery in 1803.

He managed to get through the crisis of the 1820s with most of his estates and divided them between his sons from 1830 to 1835, He was a land commissioner (landvæsenskommissær) in Sorø County. He was appointed kammerråd in 1793, justitsråd in 1803 and etatsråd in 1819.

== Personal life ==
Neergaard married twice. His first wife was Elisabeth Jacobine Vilhelmine Mourier (1778–1813), a daughter of supercargo Pierre Paul Ferdinand Mourier (1746–1836) and Elisabeth Cornelia Courtonne (1744–83). They married on 25 August 1794 in the French Reformed Church in Copenhagen. Three children survived childhood:

- Johan Ferdinand de Neergaard (3 August 1796 – 10 April 1849), who owned Fuglsang, Priorskov and Lindersvold
- Carl de Neergaard (1800 – 2 August 1850), who owned Gunderslevholm and Kastrupgaard
- Peter Johansen de Neergaard (7 May 1803 – 13 February 1872), who owned Førslev, Fuglebjerg, Mejlgaard and Faarevejle.

Neergaard's second wife was Anna Henriette Elisabeth Schow (1781–1859), a daughter of kancellideputeret Christen Schow (1738–1806) and Caroline Marie Suhr (1754–1824) and the widow of captain and kommerceråd Peter Christoffer Qvistgaard of Gerdrup and Lyngbygård, 1775–1807). They had four children:

- Elisabeth Vilhelmine Jacobine de Neergaard (13 February 1814 – 25 September 1889)
- Peter Christopher de Neergaard (7 February 1816 – 14 August 1870), who owned Julianeholm, Aunsbjerg, Sjørslev
- Johan Thomas de Neergaard (5 July 1818 – 15 August 1865)
- Victor Amadeus de Neergaard (19 April 1825 – 16 February 1886), who owned Olufskjær
