= Gunderslevholm =

Danish manor house

- The main building of the estate in 2026

General information
- Architectural style: Neoclassical
- Location: Næstved Municipality, Gunderslevvej 13; 4160 Herlufmagle, Denmark
- Coordinates: 55°17′53.12″N 11°40′16.95″E
- Completed: 1729
- Owner: Claus de Neergaard and Christoffer de Neergaard

Gunderslevholm is a manor house in southern Zealand, Denmark. It is located on the banks of the River Susaa in Gunderslev Parish, Næstved Municipality. Its history can be traced back to at least 1318. Today, Gunderslevholm is a modern, family-owned estate engaged in agriculture and forestry, residential and hunting lettings, and the experience economy.

Gunderslevholm was acquired by Peter Johansen Neergaard in 1803 and has remained in the possession of his descendants ever since, with Claus Johan Thomas de Neergaard (b. 1958) and Christoffer Johan Thomas de Neergaard (b. 1994) today owning and operating Gunderslevholm as the sixth and seventh generations. Gunderslevholm, together with Castrup and Vinstrupgaard, comprises 2,083 hectares of land and 272 hectares of lake.

== Origins and etymology ==
The name "Gunderslevholm" (originally "Gunnersløf") is composed of the male personal name "Gunnar" and the suffix "lev" (originally "løf"), which may be translated as "Gunnar's hereditary estate", and an informed conjecture is that the name refers to a historical chieftain of the Iron Age or Viking period.

Until the mid-seventeenth century, a village named Gunderslevmagle stood approximately on the site now occupied by Gunderslevholm. Although the village of Gunderslevmagle first appears in historical records at the beginning of the fourteenth century, its name suggests that a settlement has existed roughly where Gunderslevholm now stands since the Germanic Iron Age.

The Gunderslevholm estate was first documented with a written record in 1318, and upon its establishment as a manor it must have absorbed five or six smaller farms in the village of Gunderslevmagle.

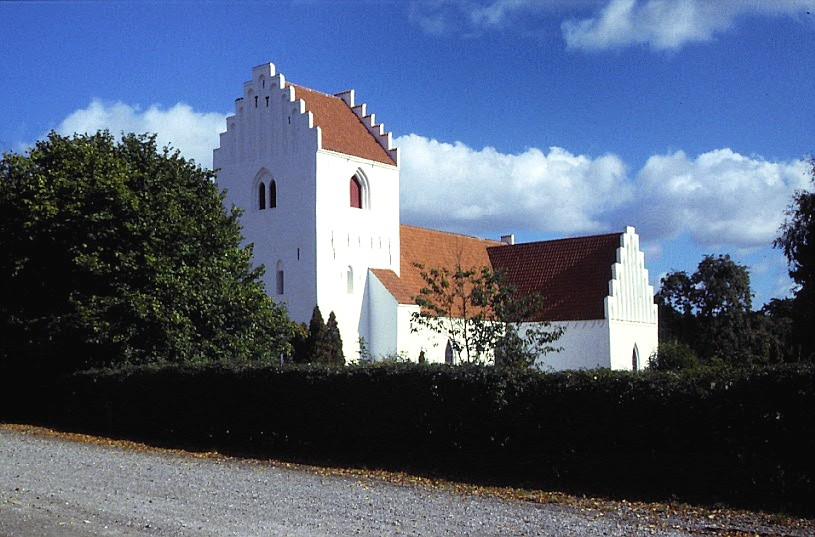
Gunderslev Church

In 1333, the brothers Peder Pedersen-Nielsen and Jens Pedersen-Nielsen sold Gunderslevholm, which they had inherited from their father, Niels Pedersen, to the provincial judge ("landsdommer") Johannes Mogensen Grubbe (1280–1345). At this time, Gunderslevholm was merely a modest village manor near Gunderslev Church.

Much later, in 1649, the lands of Gunderslevmagle were ultimately incorporated into Gunderslevholm, and over the subsequent years most of the old village’s farms and houses would disappear. Today, Gunderslev Church is the sole remnant of Gunderslevmagle.

== History ==
=== Medieval castle ===
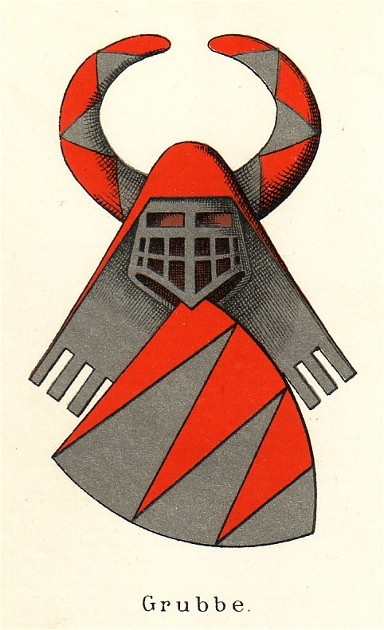
The coat of arms of the Grubbe family, who owned the estate for much of the 14th century

Around 1335, Johannes Mogensen Grubbe, who had acquired peasant holdings around Gunderslevmagle, built a fortified castle on a promontory by the River Suså. The location gave the castle both defensive and strategic significance, and traces of the old fortification can still be discerned in the park today. The waters of the River Suså appear to have extended further inland on both sides of the promontory, so that the castle was connected to dry land only to the west, and possibly further separated from it by an artificial moat.

This period of prosperity was, however, abruptly cut short in 1345, when Valdemar Atterdag had the castle stormed and razed to the ground; three days after the battle, Johannes Mogensen Grubbe died of his wounds. The cause of the conflict remains uncertain, but it may have stemmed from mortgaging of Gunderslevholm or political allegiance with the County of Holstein. A reconciliation nonetheless took place, and Johannes Mogensen Grubbe’s three sons, Mogens Jens Grubbe (1310–1369), Esbern Rage Grubbe, and Bent Byg Grubbe (1330–1391), who took over Gunderslevholm, were later restored to the king’s favour. Bent Byg Grubbe, who attained the rank of knight and a seat on the Rigsråd, became sole owner of Gunderslevholm. He died, having lost his fortune, in 1391.

Thereafter, Gunderslevholm passed through female lines of inheritance to the families of Grubbe, Basse, and Lunge, until Ellen Ovesdatter Brok (née Lunge) brought Gunderslevholm, through marriage, to Axel Lagesen Brok (1425–1498). Brok was one of the great landowners of his day, who around 1450 built a new and more habitable stone house.

=== The Gøye family (1498–1624) ===
When Axel Lagesen Brok died in 1498, Gunderslevholm passed, through his marriage to Mette Bydelsbak, into the hands of Mogens Gøye, one of the most influential figures of the Reformation era. The Gøye family is a now-extinct Danish family of ancient nobility originating from Lolland, whose history can be traced back to at least the fourteenth century. At the beginning of the sixteenth century, Mogens Gøye had the older buildings demolished, with the exception of Axel Lagesen Brok’s more recent stone house, in order to erect a new and more imposing castle in their place. He was not only a figure of national political importance but also an active landowner who renewed and expanded his estates. In all likelihood, he spent a good deal of his time at Gunderslevholm.

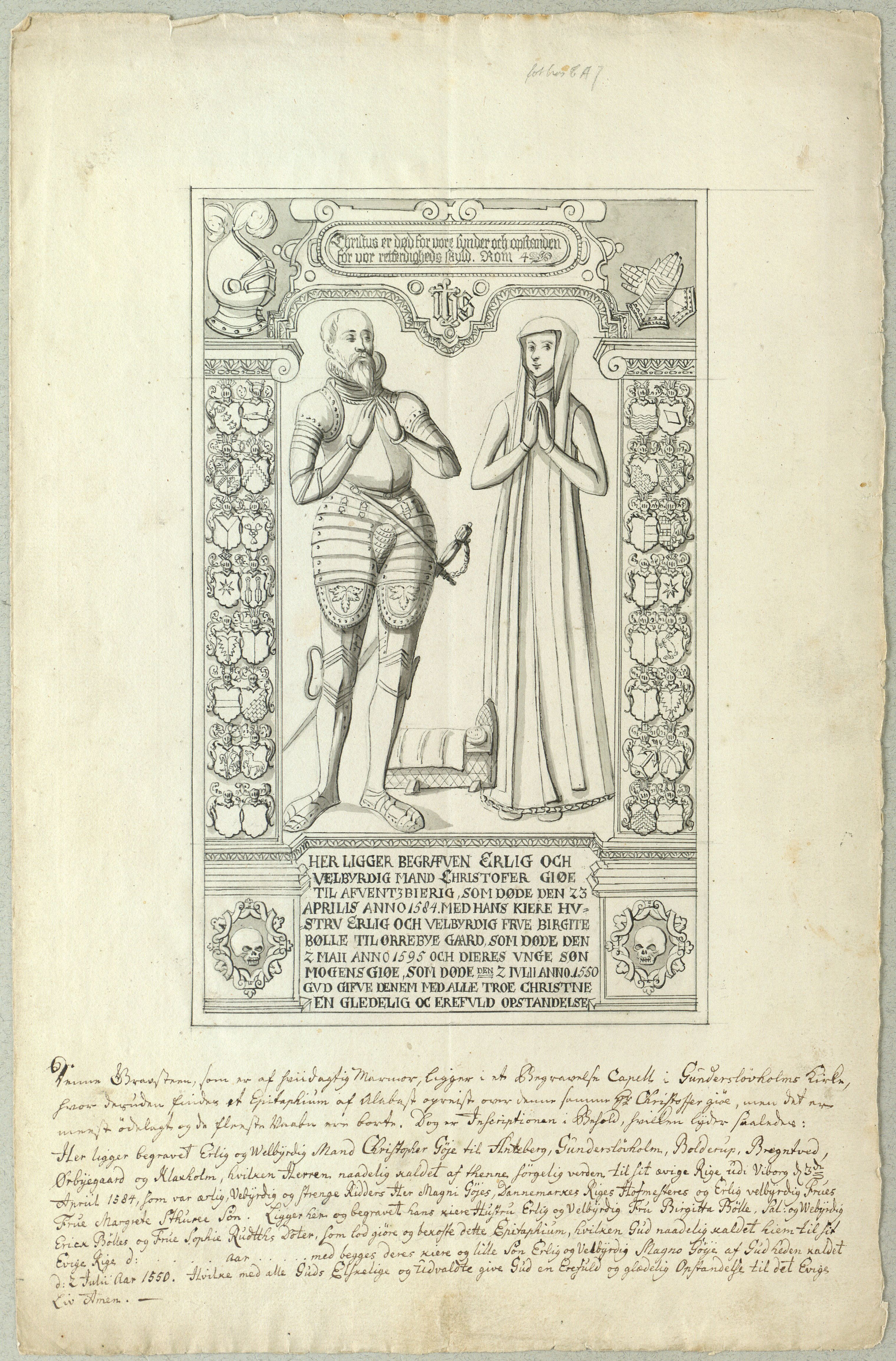
An illustration of the epitaph of Christoffer Gøye and Brigette Bølle

Gunderslevholm subsequently remained in the possession of the Gøye family for more than a century, during which the fates of the Gøye family and Gunderslevholm were closely intertwined. Christoffer Gøye and his wife Birgitte Bølle (1532–1595) in particular left their mark on Gunderslevholm and maintained a close association with Gunderslev Church, where their alabaster effigies and epitaph can still be seen. The alabaster effigies are regarded as among the finest examples of Danish alabaster work and stand as a visible testament to the close connection between Gunderslevholm and Gunderslev Church.

=== Turbulent changes (1624–1725) ===
Around 1624, Gunderslevholm passed out of the Gøye family’s possession, and a turbulent period of frequent changes of ownership followed. Over the course of the following century, owners such as Eiler Urne (1592–1640), Flemming Ulfeld (1607–1657), and Iver Krabbe succeeded one another.

Even in this turbulent period, however, lasting marks were left, among other things in Gunderslev Church, where Flemming Ulfeld and Anne Elisabeth Ulfeld (née von der Groeben; 1612–1690) commissioned the altarpiece and pulpit from the renowned woodcarver Abel Schrøder. In 1649, the parishes of Gunderslev and Skelby were merged. Iver Krabbe, who was a prominent figure during the Torstenson War and served as Governor-General of Norway, increased Gunderslevholm’s landholdings but left behind an indebted estate.

At an auction in 1693, Gunderslevholm was acquired by Birgitte Rodsteen (née Reedtz; 1650–1699) but quickly passed through several further hands before being conveyed in 1725 to Chief Chamberlain Carl Adolph von Plessen the Elder, who, more than anyone else, left a lasting mark on the estate.

=== The Plessen family (1725–1803) ===
The Plessen family is a Mecklenburgian family of ancient nobility whose earliest known member was the late-thirteenth-century knight Helmold von Plessen. The family came to Denmark at the end of the seventeenth century, and in 1830 a branch of the family was elevated to the Danish comital rank.

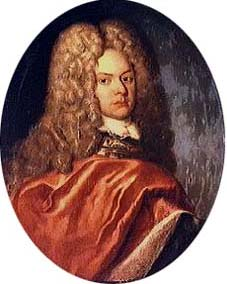
Carl Adolph von Plessen, who made substantial changes to the estate as its owner from 1725 to 1758

Carl Adolph von Plessen, who was indignant at the marriage of Frederick IV to Anna Sophie Reventlow, maintained a strained relationship with the crown and court and lived in a form of self-imposed disfavour. At the same time, however, he maintained a close relationship with the king’s siblings, Prince Carl and Princess Sophie Hedevig at Vemmetofte, whose estates and financial affairs he helped manage. His self-imposed disfavour afforded him the opportunity to devote himself to his Danish estates, and he threw himself with great enthusiasm into his seven manors in southern Zealand—Castrup, Fodbygaard, Fuglebjerggaard, Førslevgaard, Gunderslevholm, Harrestedgaard, and Saltø—among which Gunderslevholm appears to have been most important to him.

He had the old stone house and castle built by Axel Lagesen Brok and Mogens Gøye, dating from the mid-fifteenth and early sixteenth centuries, demolished. In their place, he built a two-storey Baroque mansion above a high basement in 1729, with whitewashed walls, a frontispiece, and a hipped roof. Some of the building materials for the new main house were probably reused from the old castle, but the new main house was constructed at a considerably greater distance from the River Suså.

A wing of the 18th-century farm building

Carl Adolph von Plessen had the sloping terrain down towards the River Suså converted into a park by means of extensive excavation. In 1728, he built a substantial, three-winged farm building of oak timber-framing, on the opposite side of the main house he built, which still stands today. The garden was originally laid out in the French style of the period, with regular flowerbeds, paths, and clipped hedges. Today, the park contains two candelabra-shaped avenues of lime trees which were planted in 1727, as well as several rare trees, a Japanese summerhouse with accompanying Japanese bridges from 1807, and traces of the oldest fortification from the fourteenth century.

Carl Adolph von Plessen expanded Gunderslevholm’s landholdings, among other things by incorporating the lands of the village of Tokkerup into the Gunderslevholm estate following royal permission. In 1723, he had entailed his Danish manors within the Plessen Fideicommissum (Danish: det Plessenske Fideikommis) with the purpose of ensuring undivided inheritance within the Plessen family.

After the death of Carl Adolph von Plessen the Elder in 1758, Gunderslevholm passed briefly to his nephew Frederik Christian von Plessen (1717–1783) before passing, in 1771, to his great-nephew, the envoy Carl Adolph von Plessen the Younger (1747–1810), who in carried out an external renovation in the Neoclassical style in 1787, adding a dentilled cornice, sandstone decorations, and a new portal. The renovation deprived the exterior of the main house of some of its original Baroque character but at the same time gave it the appearance that has been preserved to this day. Inside the main house, by contrast, much of the Baroque decor has been preserved, and several elements can still today be traced back to the earliest period of the building. In 1802, Carl Adolph von Plessen the Younger obtained royal permission to dissolve the Plessen Fideicommissum and sell his Danish possessions, which he did the following year.

=== The Neergaard family (1803–) ===
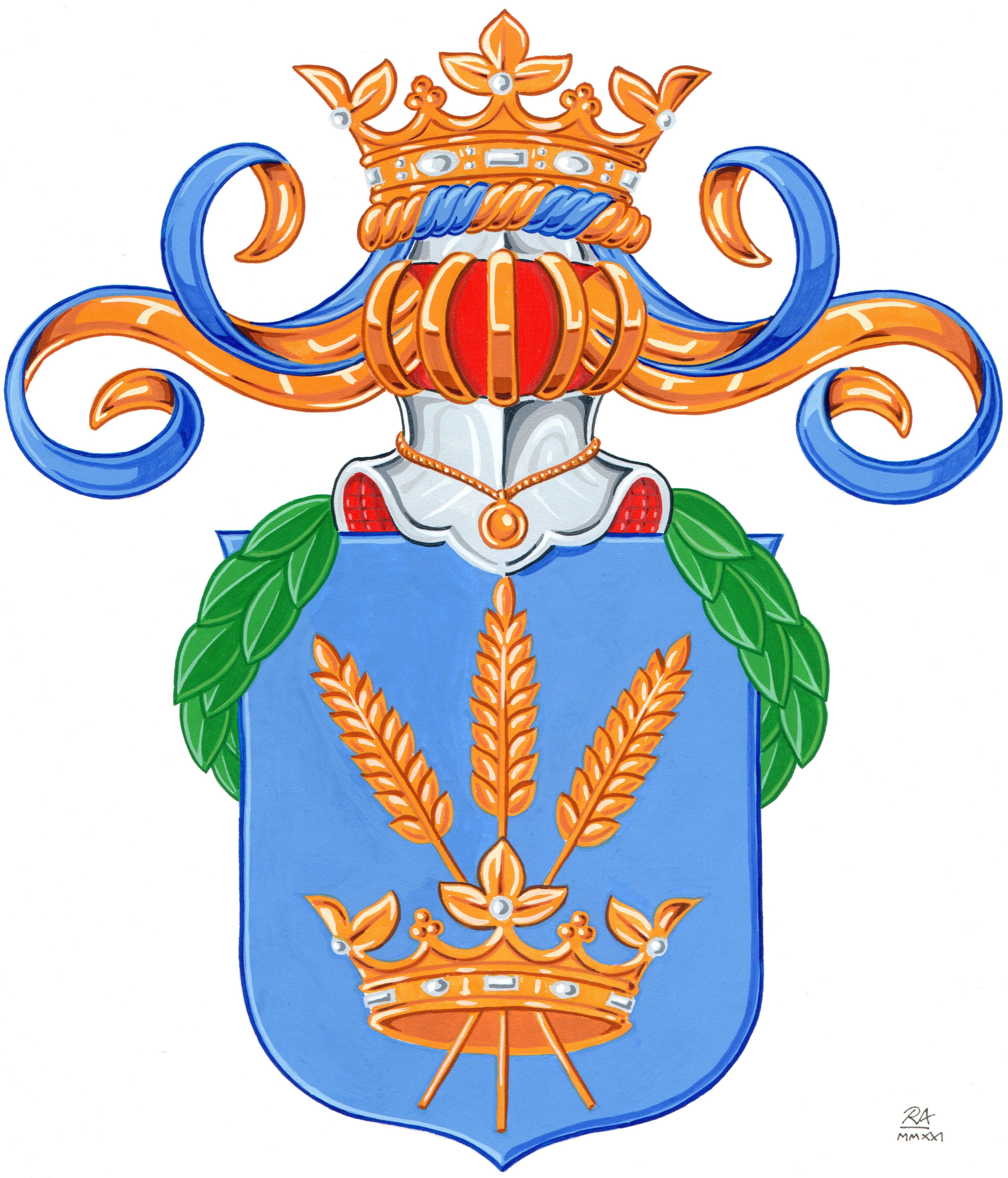
The coat of arms of the Neergaard family, which has been in continuous possession of the estate since 1803

Carl Adolph von Plessen the Younger’s dissolution of the Plessen Fideicommissum, and the associated sale of his Danish possessions, allowed the Neergaard family to acquire Gunderslevholm. The Neergaard family originates from the farm of Nedergaard in Grædstrup Parish, Tyrsting Hundred, between Horsens and Nørre Snede in Jutland.

In 1803, etatsråd Peter Johansen de Neergaard acquired five of the Plessen manors (Castrup, Fodbygaard, Fuglebjerggaard, Førslevgaard, and Gunderslevholm). The following year, Peter Johansen de Neergaard, an enterprising man, moved into Gunderslevholm and immediately began the redistribution of peasant lands and the enclosure of the forests. The economic consequences of the state bankruptcy of 1813 eventually forced him to hand over the administration of his manors to a commission in 1821. It was not until 1830 that this legal and financial guardianship came to an end.

Carl de Neergaard, who owned the estate from 1835 to 1850

When Peter Johansen de Neergaard died in 1835, his son Carl de Neergaard took over Gunderslevholm and Castrup and became a prominent landowner. He introduced new farming methods, marled the lands extensively, adopted the improved implements of his time, and laid the foundation for the Gunderslevholm cattle stock. Under his ownership, the management of the forests was improved along more modern forestry principles. In his dealings with tenant farmers and local residents, Carl de Neergaard became known for his fair terms and helpfulness. Politically, he was a member of the Estates Assembly of Roskilde (Danish: Roskilde Stænderforsamling), the Danish Constituent Assembly, and the Landsting.

When Carl de Neergaard died childless in 1850, Gunderslevholm passed to his nephew, Johan Thomas Oluf de Neergaard (1834–1921). Over his seventy-one years of ownership, he left a distinct mark on Gunderslevholm, both shaping the interior of the main house and improving the agricultural operation. He renovated the farm buildings, erected the Red Barn (Danish: Røde Lade) in 1894 and the hoist barn in 1909, and established Gunderslevholm Deer Park (Danish: Gunderslevholm Dyrehave) around 1868. The Deer Park was gradually stocked with fallow deer, red deer, and sika deer. In the 1960s mouflon were also introduced. Gunderslevholm Deer Park is the second-oldest deer park in Denmark after Jægersborg Dyrehave, and is the oldest privately owned deer park in the country.

When Johan Thomas Oluf de Neergaard died in 1921, his son, Ferdinand Lorenz de Neergaard (1874–1938), took over the estate. He was a conservative man who did not install electricity in the manor house until 1936 and never acquired a motor car, which allowed the manorial horse-drawn culture to survive for an unusually long time. Kristian Hansen (1882–1973), known as "Kristian Kusk" (transl. Kristian the Coachman), served as manorial coachman to the gentry from 1906 right up until 1958. Ferdinand Lorenz de Neergaard, who died in 1938, managed to have the forests surveyed, a pupil building ("Elevbygningen") constructed, and the estate archive catalogued. His interest in forestry also left its mark on the garden, which around 1920 was partly converted into an arboretum of foreign conifers, a pinetum.

Ferdinand Lorenz de Neergaard’s widow, Marie Henriette Dorothea de Neergaard (née Hansen; 1876–1970), continued the modernisation of the operation. In 1947, she sold Gunderslevholm to her late husband’s second cousin, Viggo de Neergaard (1881–1965), and his son, Rolf Viggo de Neergaard (1927–2021). Viggo de Neergaard was first married to Ea Dinesen (1883–1922), the elder sister of Karen Blixen, and later to Swiss-born Elisabeth Perrochet (1889–1977). Viggo de Neergaard and Rolf Viggo de Neergaard took over a well-run estate, and at this time Gunderslevholm was an extensive operation comprising a large farm complex, a cattle herd, forestry operations, a market garden, hunting activities, and a substantial number of dwellings. Even at this time, traces could still be found at Gunderslevholm of an otherwise vanished world of manorial life. During his brief time at Gunderslevholm, Viggo de Neergaard modernised a large number of dwellings and led Gunderslevholm into a new era.

In 1952, Viggo de Neergaard handed over the management of the estate in its entirety to his son Rolf Viggo de Neergaard, who had in the meantime undertaken education. In the following years, Rolf Viggo de Neergaard expanded the landholdings by acquiring Honningager in 1964, and Castrup, together with Tadse Mølle and Røde Hus, from his first cousin Edvard de Neergaard (1913–1991) in 1967.

In 1981, Rolf Viggo de Neergaard transferred Gunderslevholm to his son, Claus Johan Thomas de Neergaard (b. 1958), although Rolf Viggo de Neergaard and Claus Johan Thomas de Neergaard continued to collaborate on the management of Gunderslevholm up until 2019. In 2019, his son, Christoffer Johan Thomas de Neergaard (b. 1994), became co-owner of Gunderslevholm. This marked was the first time in Gunderslevholm’s more than seven-hundred-year history that the estate passed to a third generation of the same family in direct line of descent.

== Description ==
A barrow on the grounds of the estate, illustrated by Andreas Peter Madsen

In 1922, Dr William Norvin (1878–1940) wrote about Gunderslevholm in his work on Danish manor houses, Danske Herregaarde:

Where the River Susaa, on its course from Lake Bavelse to Karrebæk Fjord, forms the boundary between the hundreds of Øster Flakkebjerg and Tybjerg, it turns eastward at one point around a rise of ground that projects out over the waters of the river and dominates the whole picturesque and graceful landscape. In distant times, when the volume of water was far greater, and the banks were not joined by any bridge, a real boundary ran here, and the churches of Gunderslev and Skelby did not then lie as close to one another as they do today, although even then the sound of their bells mingled together every evening as they rang in the setting of the sun. Gunderslev Church was then surrounded by a village, Gunderslevmagle, in which there presumably stood a village manor house, the origin of the castle that we find, in the later Middle Ages, upon the rise of ground which, like an islet or peninsula, projected out into the river; traces of the old fortification can still be clearly seen in the park.

[...]

In the midst of the fairest region of southern Zealand lies Gunderslevholm, snugly nestled among great and splendid forests, surrounded by a delightful park that covers the slope down towards the River Susaa, close by the old church, where so many of its departed owners sleep their eternal sleep. Once, the castle towered proudly above the river, which was then the country’s principal highway, but as the times have changed, it has been transformed into a peaceful manor house, remarkably dominated by the quiet idyll of the lush Danish landscape.

— Dr William Norvin, Danske Herregaarde

== List of owners ==
As of 2020, the following have owned Gunderslevholm:

- 1318–1325: Niels Pedersen-Nielsen
- 1325–1333: Peder Pedersen-Nielsen and Jens Pedersen-Nielsen
- 1333–1345: Johannes Mogensen Grubbe
- 1345–1370: Mogens Jens Grubbe, Esbern Rage Grubbe and Bent Byg Grubbe
- 1370–1391: Bent Byg Grubbe
- 1391–1400: Jens Grubbe
- 1400–1405: Jens Jensen Grubbe and Cecilie Basse (née Grubbe)
- 1405–1410: Cecilie Basse (née Grubbe)
- 1410–1458: Ove Jacobsen Lunge
- 1458–1498: Axel Lagesen Brok
- 1498–1544: Mogens Gøye
- 1544–1558: Eskild Gøye
- 1558–1562: Peder Oxe
- 1562–1584: Christoffer Gøye
- 1584: Birgitte Gøye (née Bølle)
- 1584–1600: Mogens Gøye
- 1600–1631: Christoffer Gøye
- 1631–1640: Eiler Urne
- 1640–1647: Flemming Ulfeldt
- 1647–1665: Iver Krabbe
- 1665–1675: Karen Krabbe (née Marsvin)
- 1675–1689: Tage Krabbe
- 1689–1693: Slægten Krabbe
- 1693–1699: Birgitte Rodsteen (née Reedtz)
- 1699–1709: Christian Rodsteen
- 1709–1711: Hector Gottfried Masius
- 1711–1725: Frederik Masius von der Maase
- 1725–1758: Carl Adolph von Plessen the Elder
- 1758–1771: The estate after Carl Adolph von Plessen the Elder
- 1771–1803: Carl Adolph von Plessen the Younger
- 1803–1835: Peter Johansen de Neergaard
- 1835–1850: Carl de Neergaard
- 1850–1921: Johan Thomas Oluf de Neergaard
- 1921–1938: Ferdinand Lorenz de Neergaard
- 1938–1947: Marie Henriette Dorothea de Neergaard (née Hansen)
- 1947–1981: Rolf Viggo de Neergaard
- 1981–2019: Rolf Viggo de Neergaard and Claus Johan Thomas de Neergaard
- 2019–: Claus Johan Thomas de Neergaard and Christoffer Johan Thomas de Neergaard
