= Otto Pogwisch =

Danish government official

Otto Pogwisch (c. 1610–9 February 1684) was a Danish government official who held a number of important offices during the reign of Christian V.

== Career ==
Pogwisch was the son of Hans Pogwisch til Damsbo and Karen Brockenhuus. He visited Sorø Academy in 1623. In 1640, he entered court service as page (hofjunker). During the Scanian War, in 1644-45, he served as fændrik in the Court Company Hofkompagniet).

Pogwisch served as general war commissioner (generalkrigskommisær) from 1661 to 1674 with responsibility for the financial administration of the military. He was from February 1669 also a member of the Gehejmeråd (government) and a Supreme Court justice. In 1674, he was vice president of the Danish chancellery and president (justitiarius) of the Supreme Court.

== Property ==
Pogwisch was at an early age the owner of Ås (Børglum Herred) but sold it in 1633. He received Jernit as dowry and succeeded his heavily indebted father-in-law as owner of the estates Palstrup, Aldrupgård, Hagsholm, Løjstrup and Ørs but from 1662 to 1665 had to sell most of them to Mogens Friis.

Pogwisch was again the owner of Palstrup between 1665 and 1672. He was also the owner of Torpegård (until 1669), Haling Hovgård (1665–68), Tyrrestrup (1662–68), Lerbæk (1665–72), Ryumgård (1666–72), Hjermeslevgård (1666(?)-68), Hollufgård (1667–69), Fodbygård, Frydendal (from 1671), Saltø (1668-1684), Kongsdal (Tygestrup (1672-), Toftholm, and Vennergård (a share, 1680–84).

In spite of his many estates, Pogwisch struggled with economic difficulties, some of which he had probably taken over from his father-in-law. In 1680, an audit commission concluded that Pogwisch owed 10,000 Danish rigsdaler to the Crown. He was unable to raise the money and had to sell his house in Copenhagen at public auction.
