= Christoffer Gøye =

Danish nobleman and landowner

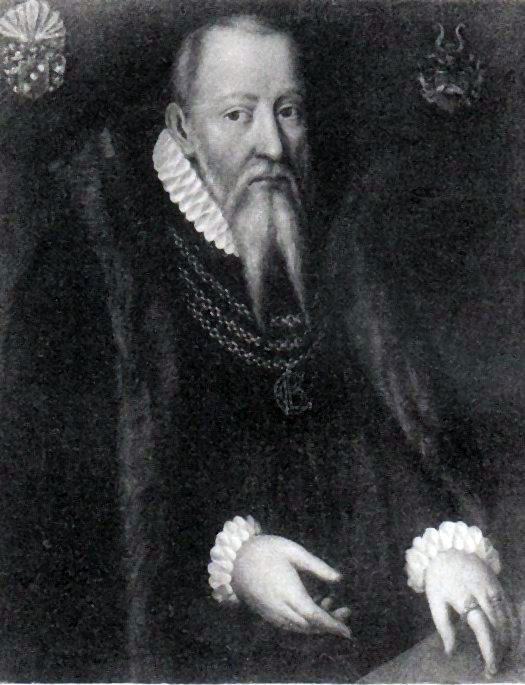
Christoffer Gøye.

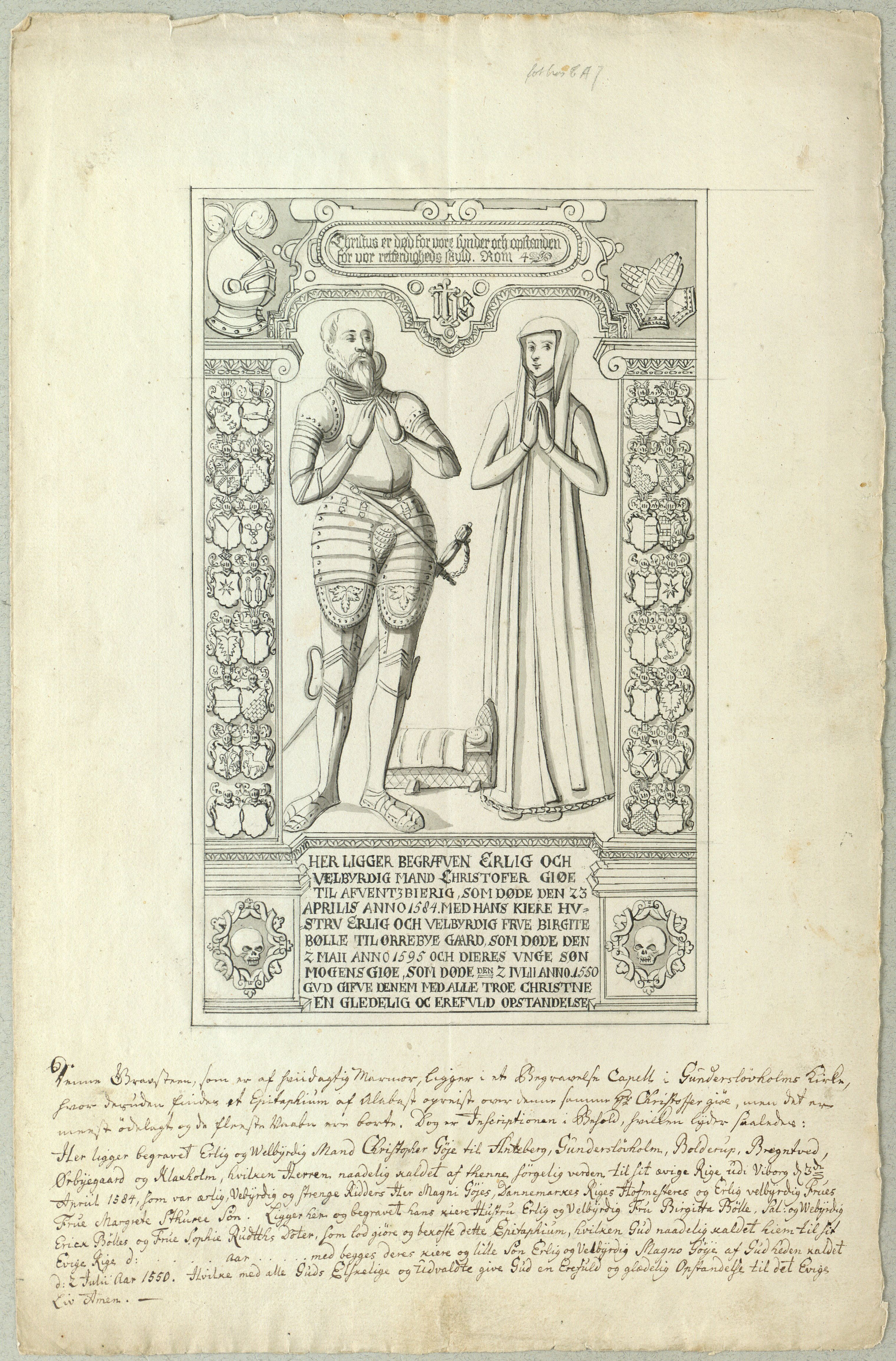
Drawing by Søren Abildgaard of Gøye and his wife's ledgerstone in Gunderslev Church

Christoffer Gøye (c. 1514 – 23 April 1584) was a Danish and major landowner. He was the son of Mogens Gøye and the half brother of Birgitte Gøye.

== Biography ==
Gøye was born in around 1514 to Mogens Gøye and Margrete Sture (died 1528).

Gøye was granted a canonate at Roskilde Cathedral (until 1558). In 1548, when Princess Anne became betrothed to Augustus of Saxony, he was part of the grandiose procession of nobles that escorted her to Saxony. In 1564–66, he took part in the Seven-Year War with Sweden without distinguishing himself.

In 1549 or earlier, he married Birgitte Bølle (1530–1595). She was the daughter of privy councillor Erik Bølle (c. 1495–1562) and Sophie Rud (død 1555).

He inherited Avnsbjerg from his father. After the death of his elder brother, Eskil, he came into possession of Gunderslevholm, through his marriage to Birgitte Bølle he became the owner of Orebygård, and the death of his nephew Oluf Mouritsen Krognos brought him into possession of Bregentved (sold 1581) and Bollerup. He was an ehthusiastic and skilled manager of his estates. The dairy at Avnsbjerg was noted for being one of the finest of its time in Denmark.

He had a reputation for being a rather ruthless businessman and landlord and was involved in numerous legal controversies. In 1573, he unsuccessfully tried to have the establishment of Herlufsholm School overturned.

hvis stiftelse G. forgæves søgte at omstøde. Ingen kunne derimod tvinge ham til at opfylde Oluf Mouritsens testamentariske bestemmelse om oprettelsen af hospitaler ved hans efterladte hovedgårde.

Høye died in Viborg in 1584 but is buried in Gunderslev Church. His son and only child had died back in 1550, and Gunderslevholm was therefore passed to his nephew, Mogens Gøye, a son of his younger brother, Falk Gøye.

== See also ==
- Gøye family
