= Saltø =

Manor house near Næstved, Denmark

General information
- Location: næstved Municipality, Saltøvej 63; 4700 Næstved, Denmark
- Coordinates: 55°13′37.54″N 11°37′55.7″E
- Completed: 16th century

Saltø is a manor house and estate located 8 kilometres (5.0 mi) west of Næstved in southeastern Denmark. The estate was acquired by Carl Adolph von Plessen in 1725 and had been owned by the von Plessen family since then. The main building from the second half of the 16th century and two half-timbered buildings from the second half of the 18th century were listed on the Danish registry of protected buildings and places in 1918. The estate covers 1,050 hectares (10.5 km^{2}).

== History ==
In the Danish Census Book, the land is listed as crown land. The first known owner of Saltø was Jacob Fleb. He had most likely acquired it from Peder Nielsen Joseøl. After his death in 1351, his children sold it to Nicolaus af Jura. In 1353, Nicolaus af Jura's son sold the estate to their relative Herman af Jura. Shortly thereafter, he sold a stake in the estate to Benedict von Ahlefeldt.

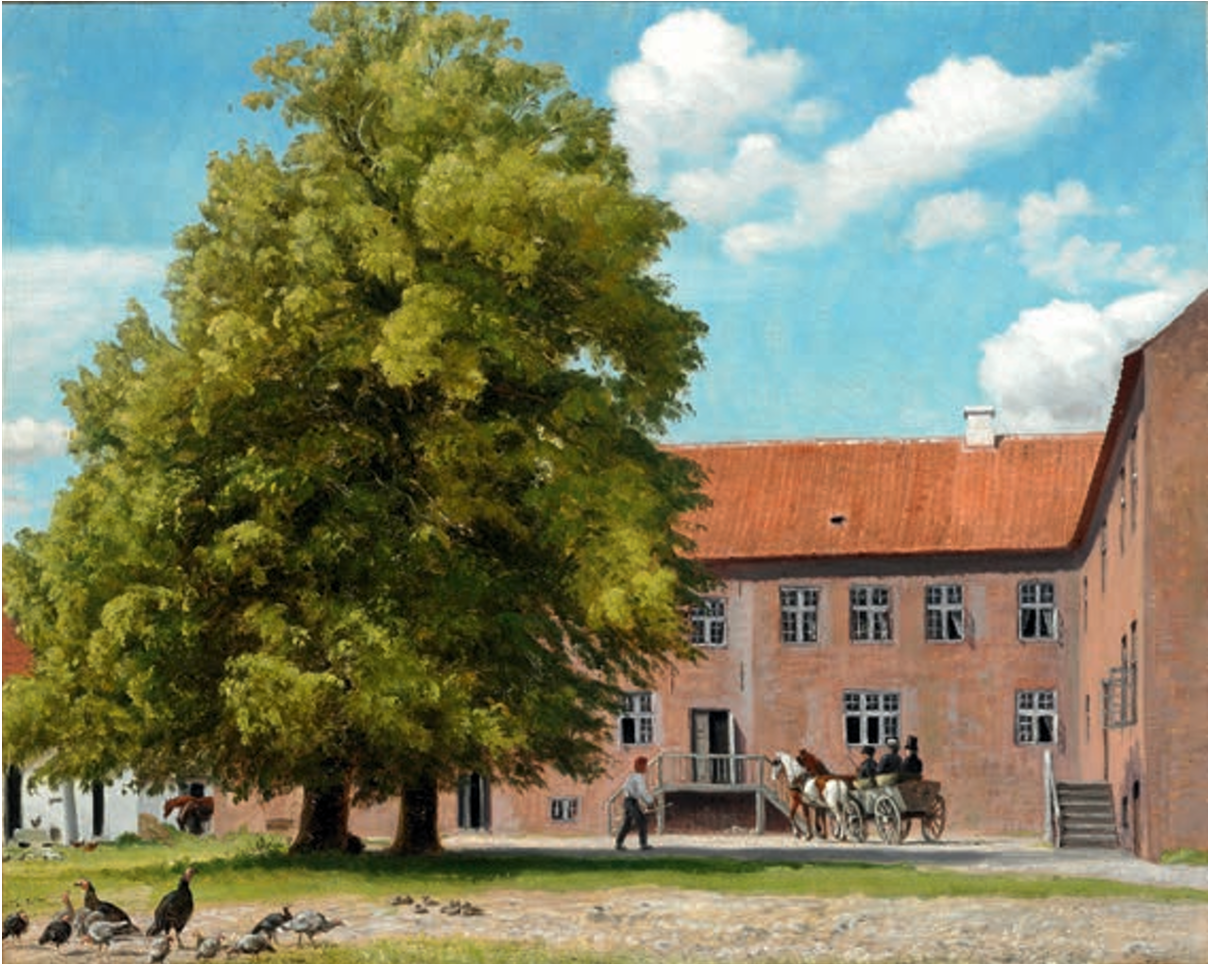
Saltø painted by P. C. Skovgaard in 1856.

In 1377, Saltø was acquired by Count Ernst af Gleichen. In 1386, he sold Saltø to Margaret I. In 1393, she granted to the Diocese of Toskilde. After the Reformation, in 1536, it was confiscated by the crown along with all other church property. It was then administrated as a royal fief. In 1646, Christian IV ceded it to his son by Kirsten Munk, Valdemar Christian of Schleswig-Holstein, in exchange for other property. Shortly thereafter, possibly already the same year, he sold it to his brother-in-law, Corfitz Ulfeldt, who then served as Steward of the Realm. After Ulfeldt's fall from power, in 1651, Saltø was confiscated by the crown along with his other holdings. In 1858, he entered Swedish service and the Swedish king gave him his Danish estates back. In 1661, he lost his Danish estates again when he sought amnesty but was imprisoned in Gammerhus on Bornholm.

After living for a time in concealment at Amsterdam, Ulfeldt moved to Stralsund in Swedish Pomerania. In 1657, King Charles X of Sweden invaded Denmark. In July 1657, Ulfeldt responded to the King's invitation to enter his service. Sweden was Denmark's deadliest foe. Ulfeldt's purpose was twofold: humiliate his monarch and secure a personal fortune. He persuaded the commandant of Nakskov (a strategically crucial fortress) to surrender to Charles X, and did his best to convince his countrymen that resistance was useless. He even loaned the Swedish king a fortune to finance the war with money that, it is believed, was embezzled from the Danish state. Finally, as one of the Swedish negotiators at the Treaty of Taastrup, he was instrumental in assuring the humiliation of his native land.

Ulfeldt's treason was rewarded by Charles X of Sweden with ennoblement as the Count of Sölvesborg in Blekinge and he was in the same time given his Danish holdings back. He later returned to Copenhagen to try to make his peace with his lawful sovereign, who promptly imprisoned him and his wife. In the summer of 1660 they were conveyed to Hammershus in Bornholm, as prisoners of state. In 1661, he gave up his Danish estates in exchange for his release.

In 1668, Saltø was sold to Otto Pogwisch. He held several high offices but was heavily indebted. In 1681, he had to sell Saltø to Knud Thott. He was already owner of Gavnø and Knudstrup. In 1693, he sold Saltø to Matthias Numsen. He had a military background and had served in the Scanian War. He was married to one of Ole Worm's daughters. In 1701 he also purchased Fuglebjerggaard.

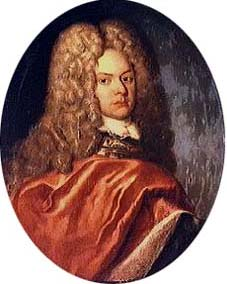
Carl Adolf von Plessen

In 1725, Saltø was acquired by Carl Adolf von Plessen. Plessen had close ties to Frederik IV's brother, Prince Carl, and was a member of the government (Gehejmekonseillet) from 1730. He was one of the largest landowners in the country. His other estates included Førslevgaard, Harrestedgård, Gunderslevholm, Kastrupgård, Fuglebjerggaard, Fodbygaard and Dronningelund. He was known for his many initiatives to improve the living conditions for the peasants on his estates, for instance by establishing numerous schools. Having no children, he placed his estates in a foundation, De plessiske fideikommisgodser. After his death in 1758, De plessiske fideikommisgodser was divided in two. One of them passed to his nephew Frederik Christian von Plessen and the other went to the three sons of his nephew Mogens Scheel von Plessen. Frederik Christian von Plessen, who had no children, in 1763, ceded his estates to the four grand-nephews of the other line.

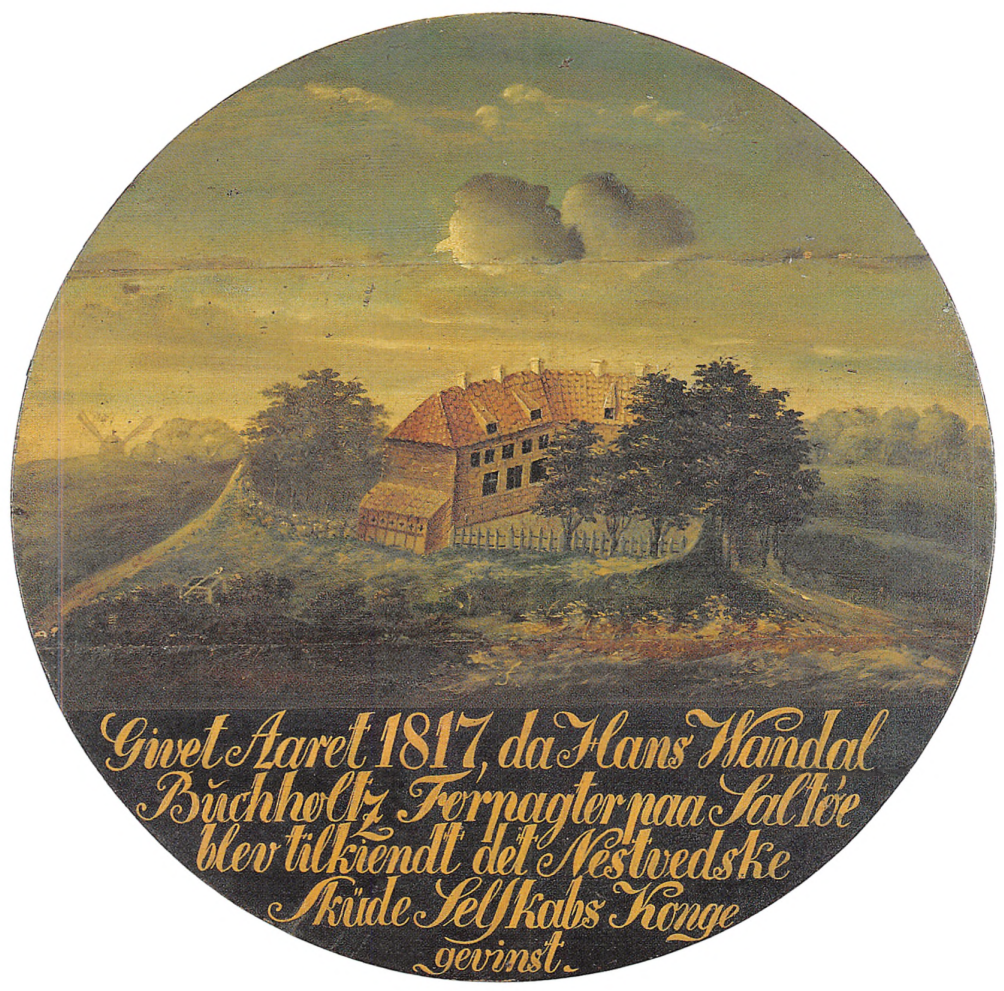
Saltø viewed on a target from 1817.

In 1771, Saltø passed to Christian Ludvig Scheel von Plessen. He was already the owner of Fusingø and Lindholm and Selsø. The estate has later passed through the Scheel-Plessen line of the Plessen family.

== Architecture ==
The main building is a two-storey, two, winged complex. The eastern part of the north wing dates from the late Middles Afes. The east wing and the western part of the north wing date from the second half of the 16th century. The main building and two half-timbered buildings from the second half of the 18th century were listed on the Danish registry of protected buildings and places in 1918.

== Today ==
The current owner of Saltø is Carl-Alexander M. H., Count Plessen. The estate covers 1,050 hectares of land.

== Cultural references ==
Saltø was used as a location in the 1961 film Landsbylægen.

== List of owners ==
- (1330) Jacob Fleb
- (1351) Jacob Flebs børn
- (1351- ) Nicolaus af Jura
- ( -1353) Nicolaus af Juras søn
- (1353-1377) Herman af Jura
- (1377-1386) Grev Ernst af Gleichen
- (1386-1396) The Crown
- (1396-1536) Roskilde Bispestol
- (1536-1646) Rge Crown
- (1646) Valdemar Christian of Schleswig-Holstein
- (1646-1661) Corfitz Ulfeldt
- (1661-1668) The Crown
- (1668-1684) Otto Pogwisch
- (1684-1686) Estate of Otto Pogwisch
- (1686-1693) Knud Thott
- (1693-1725) Mathias Numsen
- (1725-1758) Carl Adolph von Plessen
- (1758-1763) Frederik Christian von Plessen
- (1758-1771) Hairs of Carl Adolph von Plessen
- (1771-1801) Christian Ludvig Scheel von Plessen
- (1801-1819) Mogens Scheel von Plessen
- (1819-1853) Mogens Joachim Scheel-Plessen
- (1853-1892) Carl Theodor August Scheel-Plessen
- (1892-1924) Wulf Christian August von Plessen
- (1924) Gustav Friedrich Hugo von Plessen
- (1924-1949) Magnus Carl August Wilhelm Otto von Plessen
- (1949- ) C.A.M.H.E. Scheel-Plessen
- ( -present) Carl-Alexander M. H. Plessen
