= Christian Puglisi =

Danish chef and restaurateur (born 1982)

- Born: Christian Francesco Bach Puglisi; 1982 (age 43–44); Messina, Italy
- Occupations: Chef, restaurateur, writer

Christian Francesco Bach Puglisi (born 1982) is a Danish chef, restaurateur and writer. A former sous-chef at Noma, he opened the restaurant Relæ in Copenhagen, which was awarded a Michelin star and closed in 2020. He also founded the pizzeria Bæst, the bakery Mirabelle and the Farm of Ideas.

== Early life ==
Puglisi was born in Messina, Sicily, and moved with his family to Denmark as a child.

== Career ==
Puglisi worked at Le Petit Bofinger and Taillevent in Paris and at Røgeriet, Hansens Køkken og Bar, Søren K and Oliva in Denmark, and did an internship at El Bulli in Spain. He then spent two years as sous-chef to René Redzepi at Noma before opening his own restaurant, Relæ, in Copenhagen. Relæ was awarded a Michelin star, and his first cookbook, Relæ: A Book of Ideas, was published in 2014.

He went on to open Manfreds, the organic pizzeria Bæst and the bakery-restaurant Mirabelle. In February 2016 he founded the Farm of Ideas, on the Lindholm estate west of Copenhagen, to supply vegetables and milk to his restaurants; its Jersey cows provided the milk for Bæst's mozzarella.

Relæ and Manfreds closed in 2020. In 2025 Puglisi sold Bæst and Mirabelle to concentrate on writing.
