= Lindholm (manor house) =

Manor house in Lejre Municipality, Denmark

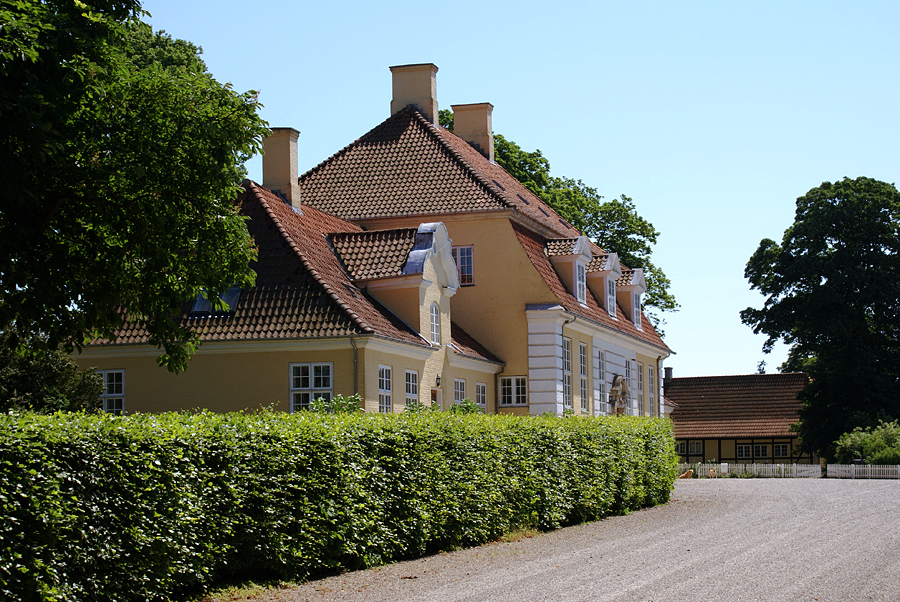
- The main building
- Interactive map of the Lindholm area

General information
- Location: Abbetvedvej 2, 4000 Roskilde, Denmark
- Coordinates: 55°38′18.52″N 11°56′17.48″E
- Completed: c. 1730

Lindholm is a manor house and estate located in Lejre Municipality, between Roskilde and Tølløse, some 30 kilometres west of Copenhagen, Denmark. It has been owned by members of the von Plassen family since 1728 and is now part of the Londholm-Selsø estate.

Lindholm's home farm (avlsgård) is operated under the name Farm of Ideas in collaboration with the chef Christian Puglisi. It is used as a venue for various gastronomy and sustainability related events and delivers fresh produce for his restaurants in Copenhagen.

== History ==
=== Origins ===
Lindholm traces its history back to the 14th century. In 1330, Johannes Hviding pawned the estate to St. Clare's Priory in Roskilde. In the 15th century, Lindholm was managed as a relatively small fief under Our Lady's Abbey. The first fiefholder was Erik Jensen Godov. He was later succeeded by his son Hans Eriksen Godov. After the Reformation, Lindholm was confiscated by the Crown together with all other property of the Catholic church. In circa 1570, Lindholm was merged with ten other farm as a royal fief. It was later incorporated in the larger fief Roskildegaard.

=== Changing owners, 1616–1728 ===
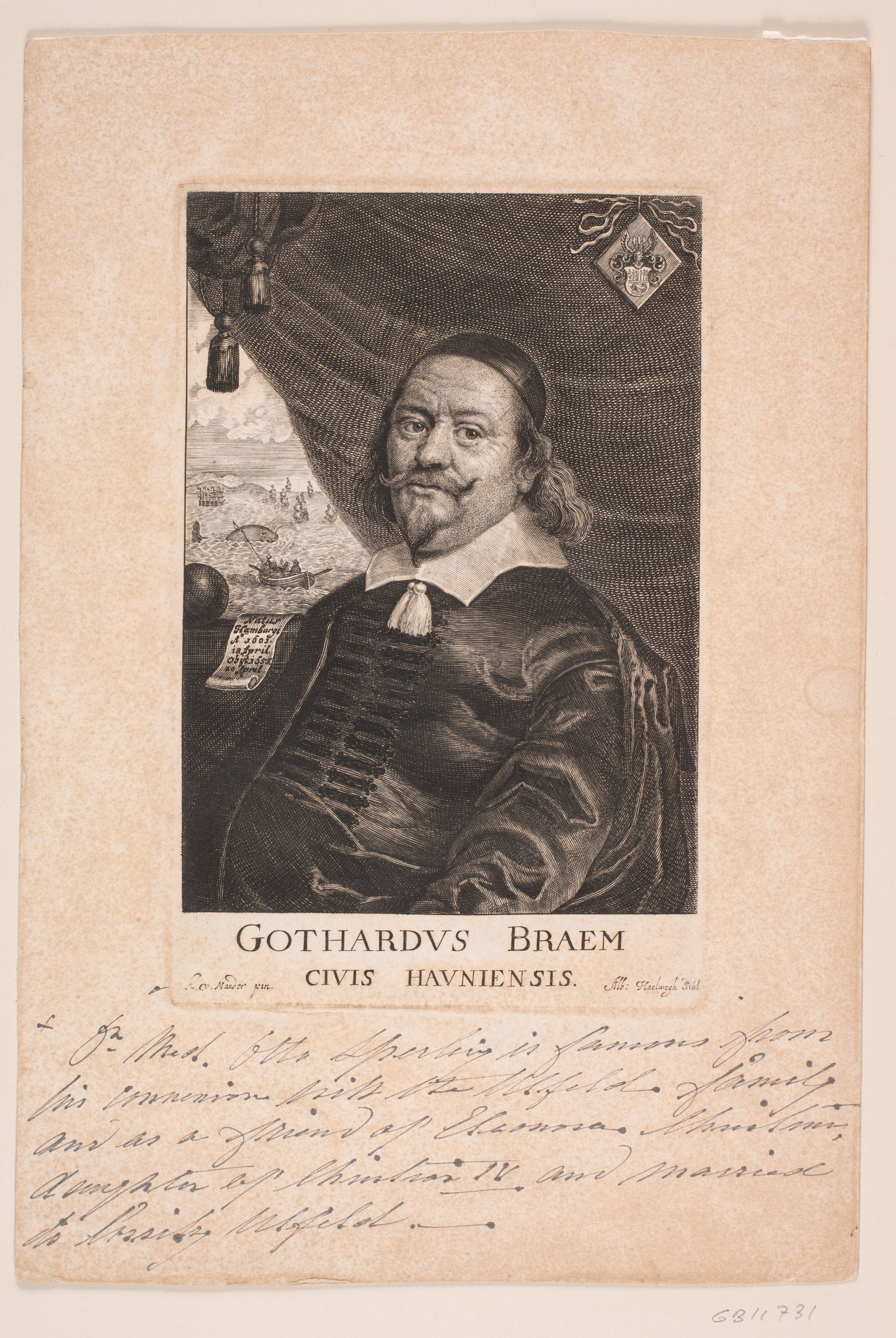
Gothard Bream,

In 1616, Lindholm was acquired by Breide Rantzau in exchange for other land. He placed it under the much larger Svanholm estate. After Breide Rantzau's death in 1618, Lindholm was endowed to his daughter Sophie Rantzau and son-in-law Hans Lindenov Lindholm.

In 1633, Lindholm was acquired by Christen Friis in exchange for other land. He expanded Lindholm into a manor, both by increasing the land under the manor and by placing more tenant farms under it.

In connection with the introduction of absolute monarchy in 1660, it became possible for people outside the nobility to own manors. Hans Zoëga, a professor at the University of Copenhagen, acquired Lindholm in 1664 but sold it to his colleague Rasmus Bartholin later that same year. Ole Rømer, his son-in-law, was for a while a co-owner of the estate.

Gothard Bream, who acquired the estate Lindholm in 1690, expanded the estate with more land. His widow, Anne Cathrine Wedelmann, married Severin Wildsch. Anne Cathrine Wedelmann's heirs sold the estate after her death.

=== Plessen family ===
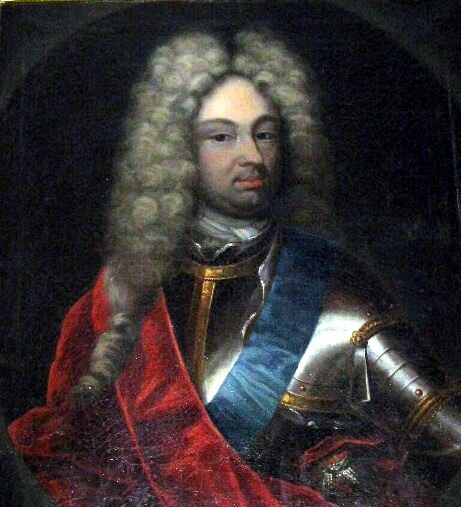
Christian Ludvig von Plessen

The new owner was Christian Ludvig von Plessen. He created a fine new garden at the site. Plessen had already acquired nearby Selsø as an endowment from his wife's aunt. By testament, Plessen created a Fideikommis from the two estates with the effect that it could neither be sold or divided between heirs. After Christian Ludvig Scheel von Plessen's death in 1752, Selsø and Lindholm were handed down to his grandson Christian Ludvig Scheel von Plessen. His son Mogens Scheel-Plessen was the next owner. The Plessen family were also major landowners in Holstein. After Denmark's loss of Schleswig-Holstein, the owners gradually became more attached to their German holdings. Carl Gabriel Joachim Vilhelm Scheel-Plessen ainhereted Lindholm in 1892. He refurbished the main building and also constructed a new home farm after a fire in 1907. The stamhus was dissolved as a result of the Lensafløsningsloven of 1919. Only an insignificant portion of land was sold in conjunction with the dissolution of the stamhus.

== Architecture ==
The main building is designed in Italian style. The central Corps de logis is seven bays wide and has a half hipped, red Mansard roof and is flanked by two, lower, five-bay service wings. The building is rendered in a pale, yellow colour but the Corps de logis has a white, three-bay, rusticated section and white corner lesenes. Both secondary wings feature a high Dutch gable-fronted dormer.

Other buildings at the site include a brick house for the manager and a half-timbered house for the gardener.

== Today ==
Londholm covers 309 hectares of which 289 hectares is farmland, 10 hectares is pastures and 10 hectares is bogland.

== List of owners ==
- ( -1333) Johannes Hviding
- (1333- ) Roskilde Sankt Clara Kloster
- ( -1536) Roskilde Vor Frue Kloster
- (1536–1616) Kronen
- (1616–1618) Breide Henriksen von Rantzau
- (1618–1633) Hans Lindenov
- (1633–1639) Christen Friis
- (1639–1645) Barbara Wittrup, gift Friis
- (1645–1664) Jørgen Christensen Friis
- (1664) Hans Zöega
- (1664–1690) Rasmus Bartholin
- ( -1690) Ole Rømer
- (1690–1702) Gothard Braem
- (1702–1704) Anna Cathrine Wendelmann, gift 1) Braem, 2) Wildschütz
- (1704–1726) Severin Wildschütz
- (1726–1727) Anna Cathrine Wendelmann, gift 1) Braem, 2) Wildschütz
- (1727–1728) Estate of Anna Cathrine Wendelmann
- (1728–1752) Christian Ludvig von Plessen
- (1752–1801) Christian Ludvig Scheel von Plessen
- (1801–1819) Mogens Scheel-Plessen
- (1819–1856) Mogens Joachim Scheel-Plessen
- (1856–1892) Carl Theodor August Scheel-Plessen
- (1892–1915) Carl Gabriel Joachim Wilhelm Scheel-Plessen
- (1915–1948) Magnus von Plessen
- (1948–1964) Victor Frederik Carl von Plessen af Scheel
- (1964–2004) Marina Scheel-Plessen, gift von Malsen Ponickau
- (2004–present) Johann Philip von Malsen-Plessen
