= County governor =

County governor may refer to:

- County governor (Lithuania), the first-level administrative unit of Lithuania
- County governor (Norway), a Norwegian government agency
- County governor (Sweden) (Swedish: landshövding)
