= Christian Ludvig Scheel von Plessen =

Danish landowner

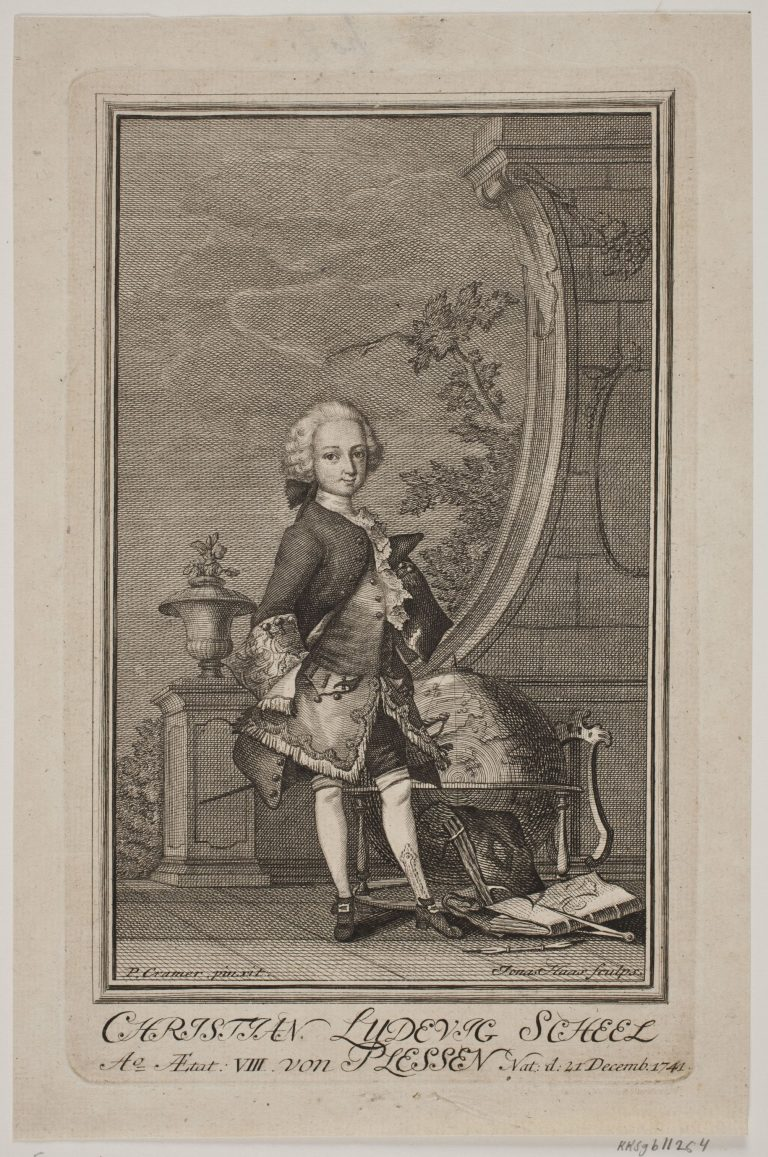
- 8-year-old Plessen on a copperprint engraving by J. Haas based on a drawing by P. Cramer.
- Born: 21 December 1741; Fussingø, Denmark
- Died: 25 October 1801 (aged 79); Lindholm, Denmark
- Occupation: Landowner
- Awards: Knight of the Order of the Elephant, 1773

Christian Ludvig Scheel von Plessen (21 December 1741 – 25 October 1801) was a Danish landowner and county governor.

== Early life and education ==
Christian Ludvig Scheel von Plessen was born at Fussingø near Randers, the son of Mogens Scheel von Plessen (1713–49) and Elisabeth Christine von Thienen (1715–88). He attended Sorø Academy from 1757 and was the following year escorted by Carl Wendt on a grand tour, visiting the universities in Genève, Göttingen, Leiden, and Utrecht.

== Career and titles ==
Back in Denmark, Scheel von Plessen became a trainee in the Treasury (rentekammeret). In 1769, he became a member of the General Land Commission (Generallandvæsenskommissionen). In 1771, he was appointed as country governor of Copenhagen County (until 1788). He was a member of numerous commissions.

Scheel von Plessen was appointed Kammerjunker in 1757 and chamberlain (Kammerherre) in 1766. He was created a White Knight im 1774 and was appointed as Gehejmeråd in 1779 and Gehejmekonferensråd 1799.

== Property ==
In an early age, Scheel von Plessen inherited Fussingø at Randers and Selsø and Lindholm at Roskilde. In 1771, he also received Harrestedgård and Saltø after Carl Adolph von Plessen. He was a pioneer in the implementation of the many agricultural reforms of the time. In 1783, he inherited Kokkedal north of Copenhagen.

== Personal life and legacy ==
Scheel von Plessen married Agathe Johanne von Qualen (15 February 1745 – 11 May 1829), a daughter of landowner and gehejmeråd Josias von Qualen (1705–75) and Elisabeth Blome (1717–83), in 1766 at Borghorst in Holstein.

He died at Lindholm on 25 October 1801 and is buried at Gevninge.

Their son, Mogens Scheel-Plessen, succeeded him as the owner of stamhuset Fusingø (with Fusingø, Selsø and Lindholm) and Saltø and Harrested.

Civic offices
| Preceded by Chr. L. v. Proeck | County Governor of Copenhagen County; 1793–1799 | Succeeded by Johan Henrik Knuth |
