= Master of the hunt =

Master of the Hunt or Huntmaster can refer to

- A court appointment in royal households
  - Master of the hunt (Polish–Lithuanian Commonwealth), Polish court official
  - Grand Huntsman of France, a French court official
- An office held in the organization of hunting in a particular area, such as the Master of foxhounds in hunts that use dogs
- The leader of the mythological Wild Hunt
