= Gyldenholm =

Manor house in Denmark

Gyldenholm Manor
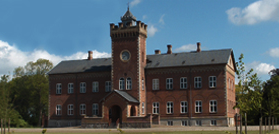
- Gyldenholm main facade
- Interactive map of the Gyldenholm Manor area

General information
- Architectural style: Historicism
- Location: Slagelse Municipality, Gyldenholmvej 6; 4200 Slagelse, Denmark
- Coordinates: 55.3405°N 11.4628°E
- Construction started: 1863
- Completed: 1864

Design and construction
- Architect: Johan Daniel Herholdt

Gyldenholm Manor is a manor house located 10 km south-east of Slagelse, between Gimlinge and Sørbymagle, Slagelse Municipality, some 70 kilometres southwest of Copenhagen, Denmark. The history of the estate dates back to 1774 but the current main building was constructed in 1864 to a Historicist design by Johan Daniel Herholdt. Gyldenholm covers 1,231 hectares of which approximately 500 hectares consist of agricultural land and 700 hectares of forest. Apart from agriculture and forestry, the estate derives its revenue from house rental and hunting rights. The main building is rented out for minor conferences, parties and other events. Gyldenholm was used as a location in the 1978 film Slægten.

== History ==
In 1774, Antvorskov Ryttergods was sold at auction. Anders Dinesen acquired two parcels, Gimlinge and Lystager, and constructed a new manor house which was named Gyldenholm. In 1800, Dinesen's son sold the estate to Christopher Schøller Bülow. In 1806, he also acquired Nordfeld and Ålebæk on Møn.

Peter Johansen de Neergaard, one of the largest landowners of his time in Denmark, purchased the estate in 1810 but sold it again just two years later. A later owner was Georg Koës Brøndsted, a son of the prominent archeologist Peter Oluf Brøndsted.

In 1862, Gyldenholm returned to the Neergaard family when it was acquired by Charles Adolph Denis de Neergaard, who already owned Castrup and Charlottedal manors in the area. The property has stayed in the de Neergaard family ever since.

== Architecture ==
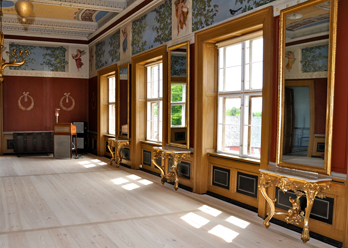
Second floor interior

The current building was built in 1864 to a Historicist design by Johan Daniel Herholdt. It consists of two storeys over a cellar and is built in red brick with decorative details in yellow brick. There is a crenellated tower on the main facade. The interior is decorated by Georg Hilker and Constantin Hansen. The property was listed by the Danish Heritage Agency in 1978.

== List of owners ==
- ( –1536) Sorø Abbey
- (1536– ) The Crown
- ( –1573) Bjørn Andersen Bjørn
- (1573–1774) The Crown
- (1774–1793) Anders Dinesen
- (1793–1800) Jens Kraft Dinesen
- (1800–1810) Christopher Schøller Bülow
- (1800–1810) Peter Johansen de Neergaard
- (1810–1812) Christen Sørensen
- (1812–1829) Jens Peter Jensen
- (1829–1836) Cecilie Sophie Warming, gift Jensen
- (1836–1840) Anders Frederik Langheim
- (1840–1862) Georg Koës Brøndsted
- (1862–1903) Charles Adolph Denis de Neergaard
- (1903–1948) Carl de Neergaard
- (1948–1970) Peter Johansen Charles Eugen de Neergaard
- (1970–1998) Carl Holger Niels de Neergaard
- (1998–present) Jacob Johan Thomas de Neergaard
