= Fuglebjerggaard =

- Interactive map of the Fuglebjerggaard area

General information
- Location: Næstvedvej 1, 4250 Fuglebjerg 4490 Jerslev Sjælland, Denmark
- Coordinates: 55°18′23.53″N 11°33′3.59″E
- Construction started: 19th century

Fuglebjerggaard is a manor house situated next to Fuglebjerg Church in Fuglebjerg, Næstved Municipality, Denmark.

== History ==
In the Middle Ages, Fuglebjerggaard was variously referred to as Vedfuglebjerg or Skovfuglebjerg. The estate traces its history back to the late 14th century when it was owned by the brothers jointly Jens and Niels Knudsen Dyre.

By way of the widow Ingerd Billesdatters Dyre, Fuglebjerg was later transferred to her brother-in-law Anders Jensen Passow.

Anders Jensen Passow died in 1474 or later. Fuglebjerggaard was then passed to his daughter Anne Andersdatter and her husband Axel Walkendorff. After Axel Walkendorff death in 1483, Anne Andersdatter was married to Chancellor of the Realm Jørgen Marsvin, who died in 1524. Anne Andersdatter stayed on the estate until her death in 1528. Ownership of the estate was subsequently distributed among several heirs.

From around 1607, Fuglebjerg belonged to Erik Walkendorff. He was also the owner of a number of other estates. It was later passed to Henning Valkendorff. For a while, it was leased by his half-brother (born out of wedlock) Herluf Eriksen. In 1623, Eriksen bought it from his half-brother. The estate was later owned by his son and grandson.

In 1625-1698, Fuglebjerggaard belonged to the army officer Niels Mund. In 1698, he sold it to Karsten Jensen Helmerskov. In 1701, it changed hands again when it was sold to Mathias Numsen. In 1705, he sold it to baron Peter Rodsteen. Fuglebjerggaard changed hands several times during the next decades.

In 1724, Fuglebjerggaard was acquired by Carl Adolph von Plessen. He renovated the buildings and improved the management of the land. The estate was after his death included in the Plessiske Fideikommis. Fuglebjerggaard, Førslevgaard and Fodbygaard were later put at the disposal of Christian Frederik von Plessen. In 1789, he transferred Fuglebjerggaard and the two other estates to his brother Carl Adolph von Plessen.

In 1773, Guglebjerggaard was leased by Johan Grandjean. He renovated the buildings and the garden. In 1795 most of the copyholds were sold to the resident peasants as freeholds. Johan Grandjean acquired the remains of the estate as arvefæste. In 1809, he sold his rights to Peder Rützow. In 1802, Det Plessenske Fideikommis was dissolved. In 1805, Fuglebjerggaard was sold to Peter Johansen de Neergaard. Fuglebjerggaard remained in the Neergaard family for more than 200 years.

== List of owners ==
- (1395-1406)Jens Knudsen Dyre
- ( -1410)Niels Knudsen Dyre
- ( - )Erik Nielsen Dyre
- ( -1453) Knud Nielsen Dyre
- (1453-1460) Niels Knudsen Dyre
- (1460- ) Ingerd Billesdatter, gift Dyre
- ( -1474) Anders Jensen Passov
- (1474-14 83)Axel Walkendorff
- (1483- ) Anne Passow, gift 1) Walkendorff, 2) Marsvin
- ( -1524) Jørgen Marsvin
- (1524-1528) Anne Passov, gift 1) Walkendorff, 2) Marsvin
- (1528-1567) Arvinger efter Anne Passov
- (1567-1605) Erik Valkendorff
- (1605-1626) Henning Valkendorff
- (1626- ) Herluf Eriksen
- ( - ) Erik Herlufsen
- ( - ) Herluf Eriksen
- ( -1698) Niels Mund
- (1698-1701) Karsten Jensen Helmerskov
- (1701-1705) Mathias Numsen
- (1705-1706) Peter Rodsteen
- (1706-1709) Hector Gottfried Masius
- (1709-1721) Christian von der Maase
- (1721-1724) Johan Thomasen de Neergaard
- (1723-1758) Carl Adolph von Plessen
- (1758-1763) Frederik Christian von Plessen
- (1763-1789) Christian Frederik von Plessen
- (1789-1795) Carl Adolph von Plessen
- (1795-1798) Ludvig Johan Grandjean
- (1798-1805) Peder Rützow
- (1805-1835) Peter Johansen de Neergaard
- (1835-1872) Peter Johansen de Neergaard
- (1872-1925) Jacob Edvard de Neergaard
- (1925-1947) Wenzel Rudolph Flach de Neergaard
- (1947-1989) Holger Flach de Neergaard
- (1989-2005) Andrè Holger Flach de Neergaard
- (2005) Johan Nicolaj Flach de Neergaard
- (2005-2012) Andreas Hastrup
- (2012- ) Bart Herman Wagenvoort
