= Carl Adolph von Plessen =

Danish statesman

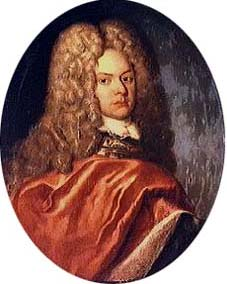
- Born: 18 May 1678; Mecklenburg
- Died: 30 January 1758 (aged 79); Copenhagen, Denmark
- Occupations: Statesman and landowner
- Awards: Order of the Elephant, 1730

Carl Adolph von Plessen (18 May 1678 – 30 January 1758) was a Danish statesman and landowner. He played a central role during the early reign of Christian VI but fell out of favour at the court and resigned in 1733. He was a major stakeholder in the Danish Asiatic Company and the Danish West Indies Company and owned a number of estates in Denmark and the Danish West Indies. He was the brother of Christian Ludvig von Plessen.

== Early life and education ==
Carl Adolf von Plessen was born on 18 May 1678 in Mecklenburg, the son of chamberlain and later president of the Rentekammeret Christian Siegfried von Plessen (1646–1723) and Sophia Agnes von Lepel (c. 1650–84). He was the brother of Christian Ludvig von Plessen. He studied at Utrecht University.

== Political career ==
Plessen accompanied Prince Carl on his grand tour in 1696–99. He later followed the prince back to Denmark where he served first as his Hofmeister and from 1708as his chief chamberlain (overkammerherre). Frederik IV's marriage to Anna Sophie divided the royal family and Prince Carl and Princess Sophia Hedwig moved court to Vemmetofte in 1721. Plessen followed them and played a key role both at their court and in the management of the estate. Plessen was, like the Prince and the Princess, inexorable in his view on Queen Anna Sophie and her party which completely dominated the government in Copenhagen, and the king's overtures in 1825 were therefore met with cold air at Vemmetofte. On his death bed, Frederick IV tried to win Plessen over by awarding him the Order of the Elephant but in vain. This hostility and his profound religious beliefs won Plessen the favour of Crown Prince Christian, who immediately included him in the new government upon his ascent to the throne in 1730.

Plessen fell out of favour at the court and resigned in April 1733. Plessen lost all political influence and his attempt to return to power when Frederik V ascended the throne in 1746 failed.

After his resignation, Plessen return to Princess Sophie Hedevig's court at Vemmetofte a position as chief chamberlain. He assisted her in drafting the statutes for Vemmetofte Frøkenkloster. It entered into force at her death in 1735 with Plessen as the first curator of the institution.

== Property ==
Plessen was a major stakeholder in both the Danish East India Company and the Danish West India Company. He served as president of the Danish West Indies Company and was a driving force behind the purchase of Saint Croix from France in 173.

He owned the estates Førslev, Harrested, Gunderslevholm, Saltø, Kastrup, Fuglebjerg and Fodby on Zealand and Dronninglund Manor in Jutland. Princess Sophia Hedwig bequeathed Blågård outside to him. Plessen founded 16 public schools on his estates and took a personal interest in overseeing their operation.

== Personal life ==
Plessen never married. He was interested in the natural sciences and was the owner of an extensive personal library. He supported the historian Hans Gram.

He died on 30 January 1758 and is buried in St. Peter's Church in Copenhagen.
