= Ringsted Abbey =

Benedictine monastery in Denmark

Coordinates: 55.4451°N 11.7867°E

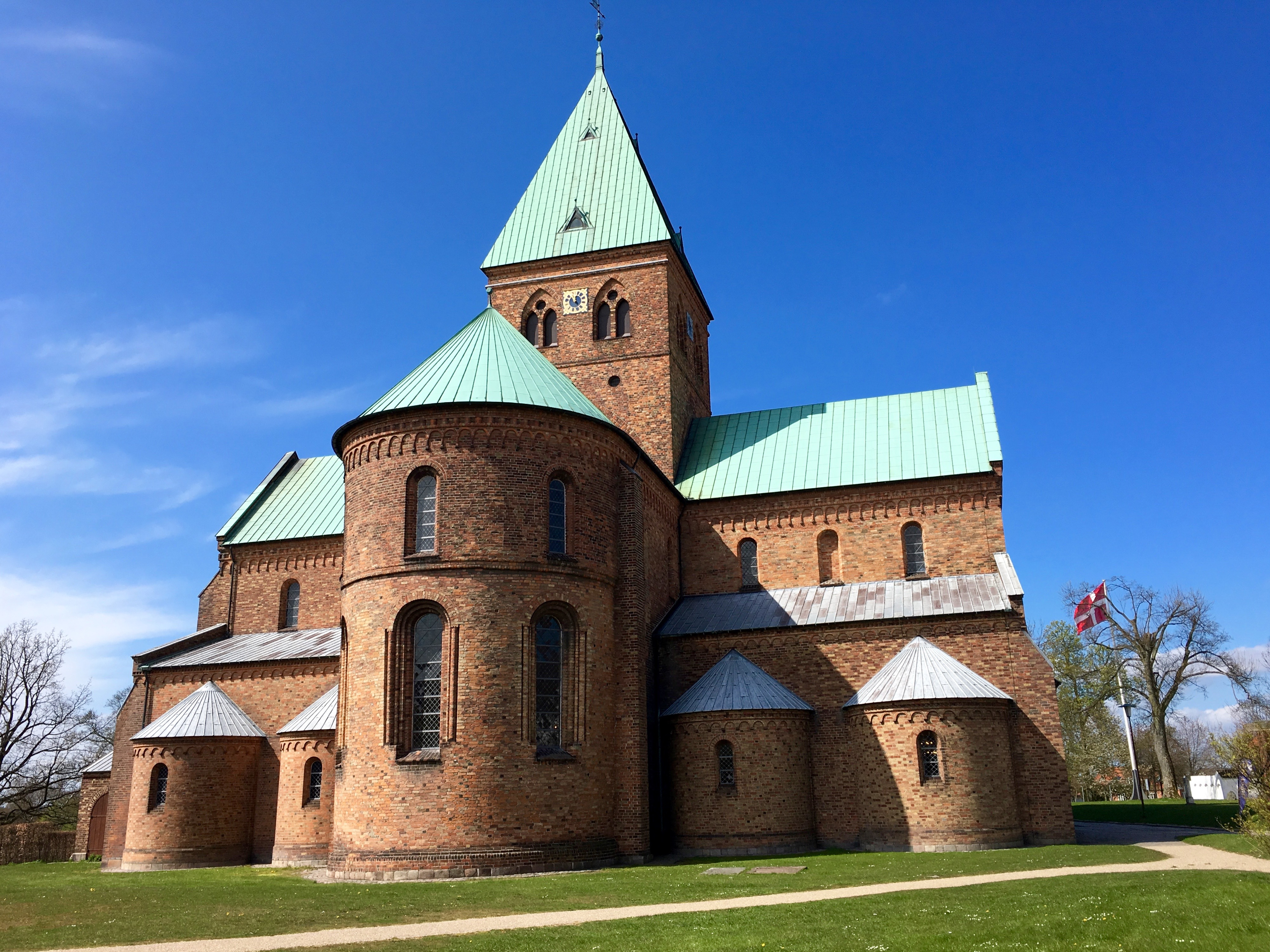
St. Bendt's Church in Ringsted

Ringsted Abbey (Danish: Ringsted Kloster) was one of the earliest and most influential Benedictine houses in Denmark, active from the late 11th-century until the Danish Reformation. It was located at Ringsted on the Danish island of Zealand.

== History ==
=== The first Ringsted Abbey ===
Ringsted was one of Denmark's earliest towns and in Viking times a center for worship. The town had a royal mint in 1020 and a Benedictine priory was established by King Sven Estridsen before his death in 1076, but not completed until 1081 or 1082 under Svend Norbagge, Bishop of Roskilde. It was dedicated to the Virgin Mary. The first priory church was constructed out of limestone. According to tradition the monks were brought by the king from one of his campaigns in Britain. Ringsted Abbey owed its importance to its being the resting place of Knud Lavard who was murdered at Haraldsted forest just north of Ringsted in 1131 and was canonized in 1170 as Saint Knud Lavard.

=== The second Ringsted Abbey ===
It is unclear what happened to the original priory, but in 1135 King Erik Emune refounded Ringsted Priory with Benedictine monks from Odense. The abbey received its recognition by Pope Innocent II in 1138. St. Mary's Church (Danish: Sct Maria Kirke) is the oldest brick church in Scandinavia, a successor to the travertine church of 1080. Knud Lavard's bones were moved into a new chapel in the priory church at Ringsted in 1157 with the approval of his son, King Valdemar I of Denmark. The church became an immediate pilgrimage site. With the funds raised from pilgrims and royal patronage the abbey church was expanded and dedicated in 1170 with great ceremony. Subsequently Ringsted Priory became the location of the burials of many of Valdemar's descendants from 1182 until 1341. King Valdemar Sejr and Queen Dagmar were buried there. The church was later renamed St. Bendt's Church. For centuries, the church served as the monastery church. After the Reformation in 1571 it became a parish church.

Ringsted Priory became an abbey in the mid-13th century and by that time was so influential that its abbot was a permanent member of the State Council (Danish: Rigsråd) which advised Denmark's kings until the Reformation. His rank was equal to that of the bishops. Ringsted Abbey enjoyed almost continuous royal support as well as that of the most powerful noble families and bishops of Denmark. Its royal connections brought it extensive land holdings in Zealand and other parts of Denmark. The abbey also had papal protections and in 1193 received permission to hold mass even when Denmark lay under interdict as happened periodically in the stormy years of the 13th century. The abbey suffered damaging fires in 1241 and 1300, but with the amount of income available quickly rebuilt.

=== Post Protestant Reformation ===
Denmark became a Protestant nation with the adoption of the Lutheran Ordinances in October 1536. Ringsted once again received special treatment. All other monastic houses were closed, but Ringsted remained open, though under the direction of a Lutheran superintendent. The monks eventually abandoned their abbey with some travelling south to join other Benedictine houses in Germany. In time the abbey and all its properties reverted to the crown.

Unfortunately, during the Reformation the entire archive of the monastery was destroyed. The national archives contain a few letters from the 15th century and bit of the Ringsted Book which outlines monetary privileges. In 1592, Ringsted Abbey was given to the nobleman Lave Beck who was appointed sheriff and county judge. He transformed it into a large manor house. In the 17th century the abbey's outbuildings gradually fell into disrepair and were torn down. In 1806 a fire destroyed the entire complex except for St. Bendt Church, the only building left of Ringsted Abbey.

== Other sources ==
- Thorsteinsson, Hjalmar. 'Det forsvundne kloster i Ringsted set i glimt'.(in Danish)
- Statens Arkiver. 'Ringsted Kloster 144-1600'.(in Danish)
- Salmonsens Conversationslexikon. "Ringsted Herred'. p. 216 (in Danish)
- Eingsted Kloster
