= Neergaard =

Neergaard is a surname. Notable people with the surname include:

- Bodil Neergaard (1867–1959), Danish estate owner, philanthropist, and socialite
- Carl Neergaard (1800–1850), Danish landowner and politician
- Claus Marius Neergaard (1911–1990), Norwegian politician
- Daeg Neergaard Faerch (born 1995), American actor, model, rapper, and producer
- Elna M. de Neergaard (1872–1946), Danish-born American textile artist
- Hermania Neergaard (1799–1875), Danish flower and still-life painter
- Jens Bruun de Neergaard (1742–1788), Danish judge and landowner
- Joachim Neergaard (1877–1920), Danish composer
- Joachim Wedell-Neergaard (1862–1926), Danish diplomat, landowner, and chamberlain
- John Neergaard (1795–1885), Norwegian farmer, bailiff, and politician
- Mette de Neergaard (born 1991), Danish curler
- Niels Neergaard (1854–1936), Danish historian and political figure
- Paul Neergaard (1907–1987), Danish agronomist, mycologist, and agriculturist
- Preben Neergaard (1920–1990), Danish stage and film actor

== See also ==
- Cabinet of Neergaard (disambiguation), multiple Danish cabinets
- Neergaard (noble family), Danish noble family
- Neergaard's sunbird, a species of bird in the family Nectariniidae
