= Arnold Eugen Reimann =

Arnold Eugen Reimann may refer to:

- Arnold Eugen Reimann (bank manager) (1827–1888), Danish bank manager
- Arnold Eugen Reimann (landowner) (1889–1956), Danish landowner and businessman
