= Joachim Bruun de Neergaard =

Joachim Bruun de Neergaard may refer to:

- Joachim Bruun de Neergaard (politician), a Danish landowner and politician
- Joachim Wedell-Neergaard (née Joachim Bruun de Neergaard), Danish diplomat and landowner (son)
- Joachim Neergaard, a Danish composer
