= Kjøbenhavns private Laanebank =

Kjøbenhavns private Laanebank (Copenhagen Private Loaning Bank) was the first private bank in Copenhagen, Denmark.

== History ==
The bank was established on 1 February 1854 at the initiative of Industriforeningen in association with, amongst others, Christian August Broberg, Gottlieb Abrahamson Gedalia and Alfred Hage. The vinegar manufacturer Arnold Eigen Reimann was selected for the post as the bank's first manager. The bank was initially based in his apartment in Løngangsstræde. It later moved to more suitable premises at Amagertorv 5. From 1753 to 1888, Københavns private Laanebank had a branch in Malmö, Sweden.

In 1918, Københavns private Laanebank acquired Dansk Arbejderbank. In 1922, it was itself acquired by Landmandsbanken.

== See also ==
- List of banks in Denmark
