= Joachim Bruun de Neergaard (politician) =

Danish landowner and politician

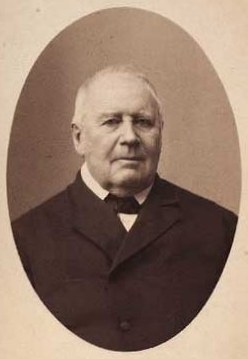
Joachim Bruun de Neergaard.

Joachim Peter Christian Bruun de Neergaard (26 March 1806 – 28 January 1893) was a Danish landowner and politician. He was a member of the Landsting from 1875 until his death. He owned Svenstrup Manor at Borup.

== Early life and ducation ==
Neergaard was born in Copenhagen, the son of chamberlain Johan Andreas Bruun de Neergaard (1770–1846) and Elise Henriette, née Cramer. His maternal grandfather was Laurentius Johannes Cramer. Hisfather owned the estates Skjoldenæsholm, Svenstrup and Merløsegård. He completed his secondary schooling in 1822 and earned a law degree from the University of Copenhagen in 1827.

== Career ==
In 1830, Neergaard became an assistant (auskultant) in Rentekammeret. In 1834–45, he was a captain in the King's Life Guard (Student Corps).

A few years prior to his death, Neergaard's father had turned his two manors into two entailed estates, Svenstrup for Joachim and Skjoldenæsholm for his brother Andreas. Neergaard took a profound interest in the management of his estates. For fifty years, he was a board member of Sorø County's Agricultural Society (1836–86). In 1845–71, he was a member of Roskilde County Council. For many years, he was also part of the management of Sparekassen for Ringsted og Omegn.

In 1875, he became a member of the Landstinget by royal appointment. He was created a chamberlain in 1847. In 1878m he was created a 2bd-class Commander of the Dannebrog. In 1889, he became a 1st-class Commander of the Order of the Dannebrog. In 1892, he was awarded the title of gehejmekonferensråd.

== Personal life ==
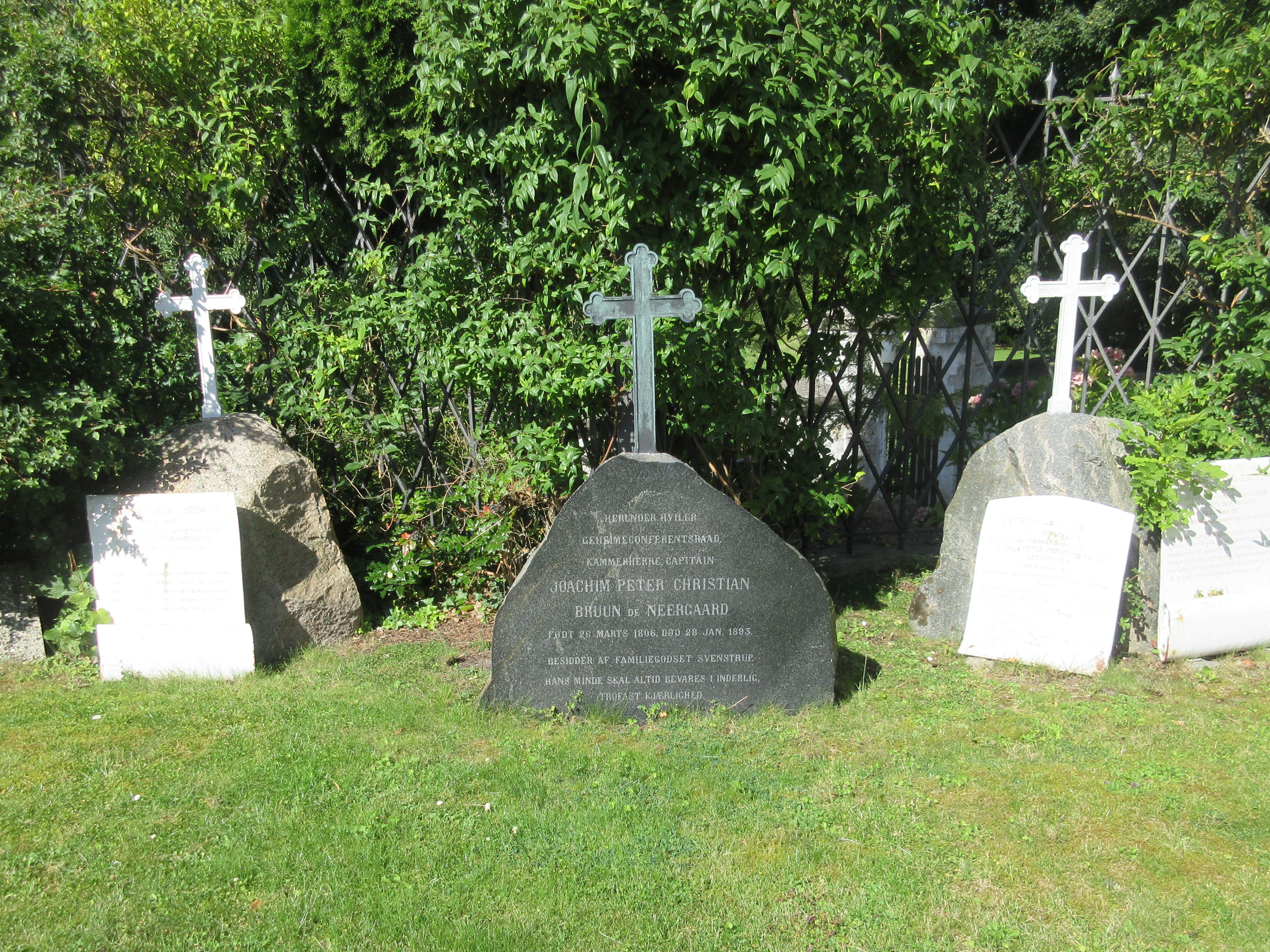
Neergaard's tombstone in Borup vhurchyard.

In 1895, Neergaard married Christiane Louise von Stemann (1807–1837), the daughter of gehejmestatsminister Poul Christian von Stemann. The couple had one daughter, Louise Elise Henriette Bruun de Neergaard (1938–1864), who was married to Gustav Joachim, baron Wedell-Wedellsborg (1829–1893). After the death of his first wife, just two years after their wedding, Neergaard was married to her sister Petronella (1804–1839). After the early death of his second wife, in 1839, he was married to Johanne Christiane Zeuthen (1816–1850) in 1844. She was a daughter of Supreme Court justice Vilhelm Peter Zeuthen (co-owner of Tølløsegård) and Bolette Zeuthen née Bartholin. He and his third wife had two sons: Johan Andreas Laurentius Bruun de Neergaard (1845–1910) and Vilhelm Peter Christian Bruun de Neergaard (1846–1912). The latter was married to Sofie Louise Bardenfleth (1955–1947). He owned Stensbygård.

Neergaard died on 28 January 1893 in Copenhagen. He is buried in the churchyard of Borup Church. Svenstrup was passed to his daughter's eldest son, Joachim, who adopted the compound name Wedell-Neergaard, Svenstrup is still owned by the Wedell-Neergaard family.
