= Stensbygård =

Agricultural estate in Denmark

Stenbygård
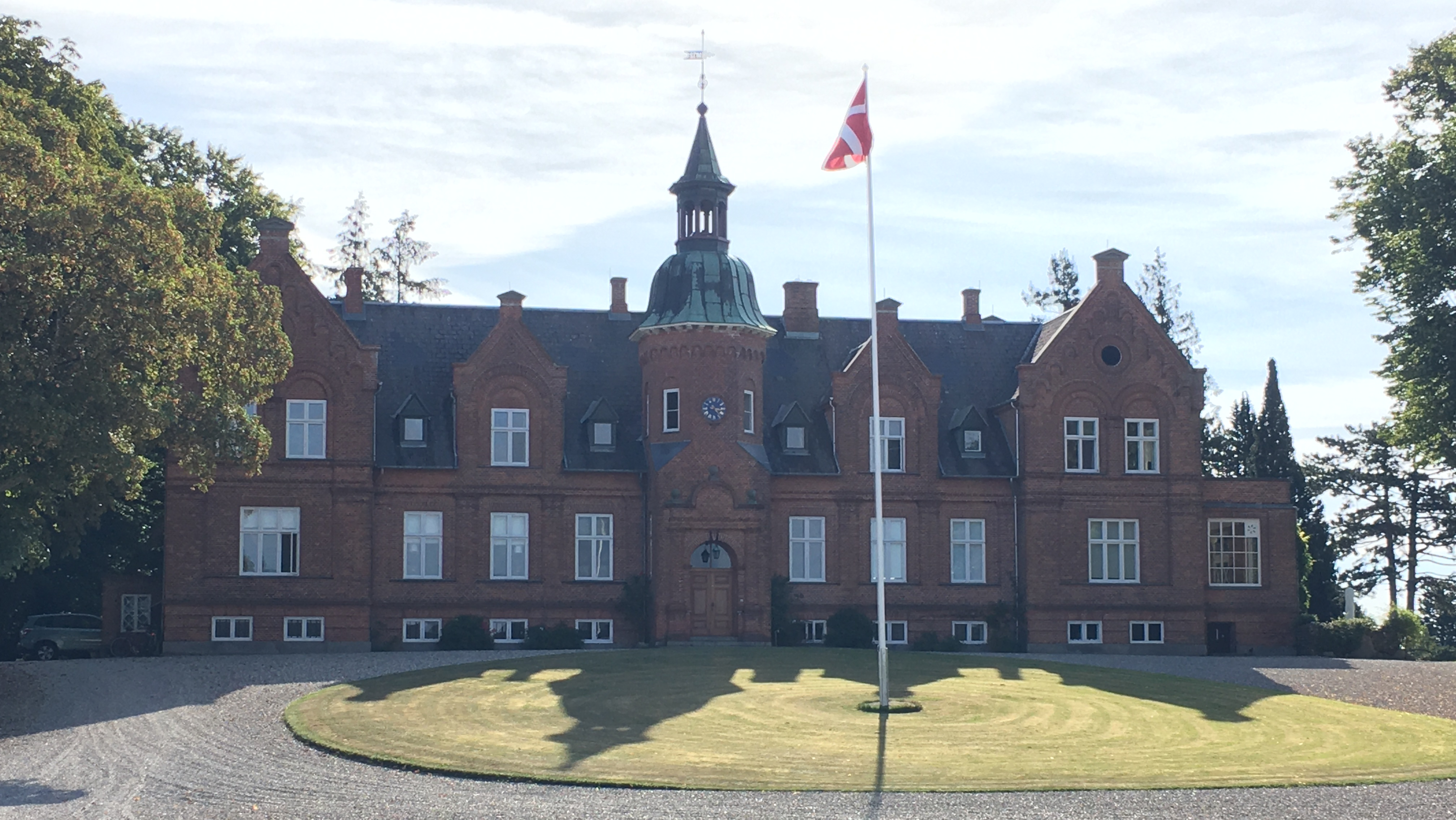
- Vintage photo of the main building

General information
- Architectural style: Historicism
- Location: Vordingborg Municipality, Denmark
- Coordinates: 54°58′45″N 12°01′40″E
- Completed: 1871

Design and construction
- Architect: August Klein

Stensbygård is an agricultural estate situated close to Langebæk and the southern tip of Zealand, Vordingborg Municipality, some 100 km south of Copenhagen, Denmark. The present main building was constructed in 1871 to a Historicist design by August Klein.

The estate covers approximately 410 hectares of land of which 260 hectares are farmland and 150 hectares are forest.

== History ==
=== Malling family ===
When Vordingborg Cavalry District (Vordingborg Rytterdistrikt) was sold at auction by the Crown, Engelholm was sold to the local butcher Hans Petersen. He was married to the widow of miller Bendix Malling. On behalf of Malling's children, Petersen also bought the lots Stensby, Vesterbæk and Vranggaarde.

In 1793, Petersen sold Stensby Mill, Vrangsgårde (two farms) and Vestenbæk village (total area: 39 tønder hartkorn) to his stepson Jacob Malling for 33,000 Danish rigsdaler. In 1806, Stensbygaard was merged with Vranggaardene. The estate was known as Vranggaard.

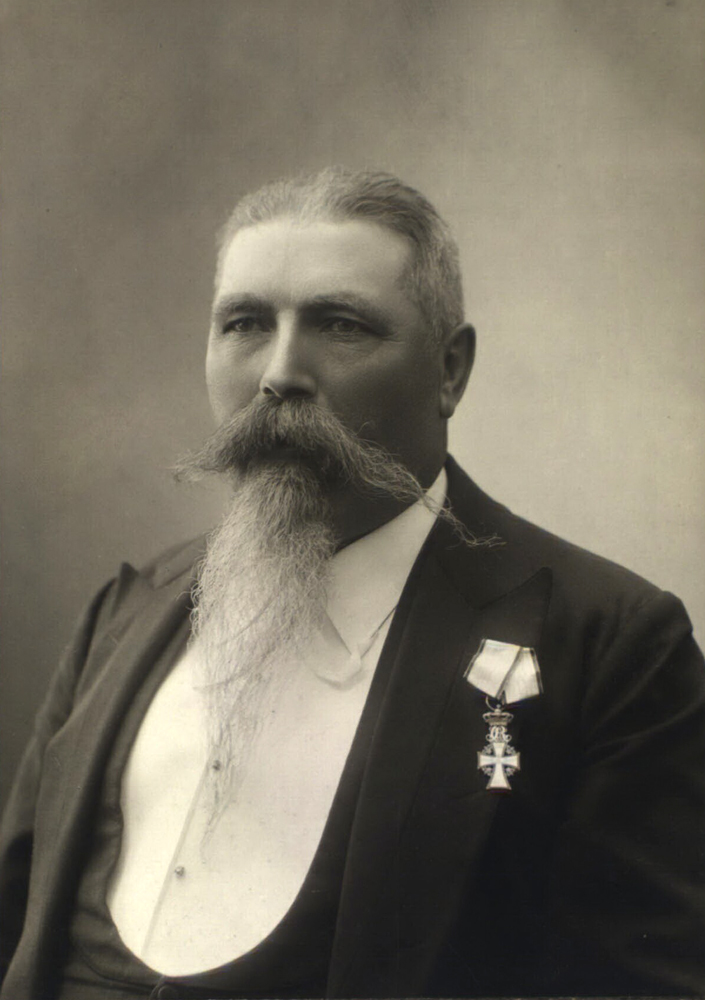
Hans Peter Neergaard Terpager Malling.

Jacob Malling was married to Marie Vibeke Neergaard with whom he had four children. His widow kept Stenbygård after her husband's death in 1820. On her own death in 1831, Stenbygård passed to their eldest son Peter Neergaard Malling (1807–1979). He was married to Regine Laurenze Resch (1807–1876) with whom he had six children.

On Peter Neergaard Malling's death, Stensbygård passed to his son Hans Peter Neergaard Terpager Malling. In 1871, he charged August Klein with the design of a new main building.

=== Changing owners, 1897–1923 ===
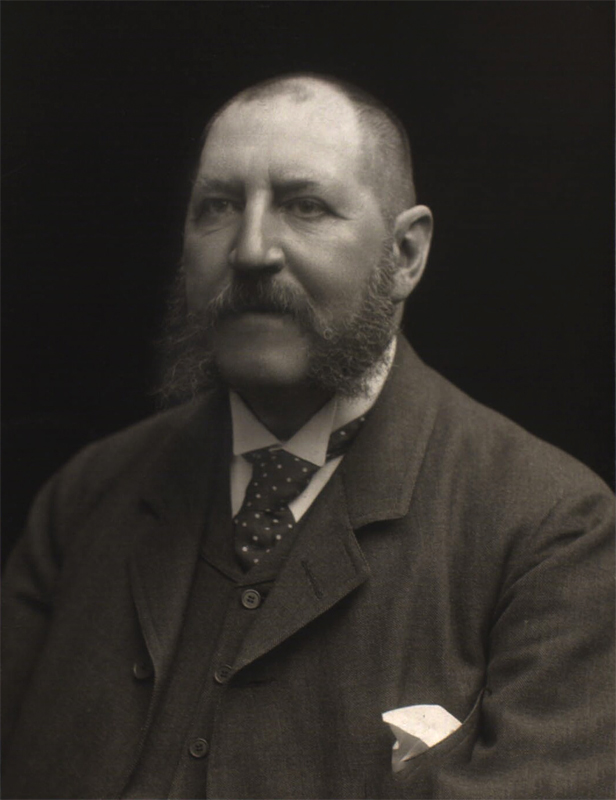
Vilhelm Peter Christian Bruun de Neergaard.

In 1897, Stensbygård was sold to Vilhelm Peter Christian Bruun de Neergaard. He was the son of Joachim Bruun de Neergaardm, who had owned Svenstrup at Vorup. On the father's death in 1893, Svenstrup had passed to his nephew Joachim Baron Wedell-Wedellsborg, a son of his half-sister Luise Elise Henriette Bruun de Neergaard, who adopted the compound name Wedel-Neergaard. He held the titles of chamberlain (kammerherre) and Gofjægermester.

In 10+7. Stensbygaard was acquired by Peter Martin Oehlenslâger Wessel. Born in Svendborg on Gunen, he had emigrated to Chile in the middle of the 1860s. In 1893, after making a fortune as a businessman, he had returned to Denmark where he became Chilean consul-general in Copenhagen. He lived in England from 1903 to 1909.

In 1910, Stensbygård was sold to the businessman Victor Albert Goldschmidt 1870-1933. He was the son of businessman Sigfred Goldschmidt.

In 1913, Stensbygaard changed hands again when it was sold to G. Rée. He was already the owner of Holbæk Ladegård at Golbæk.

=== Arnold Eugen Eeiman ===
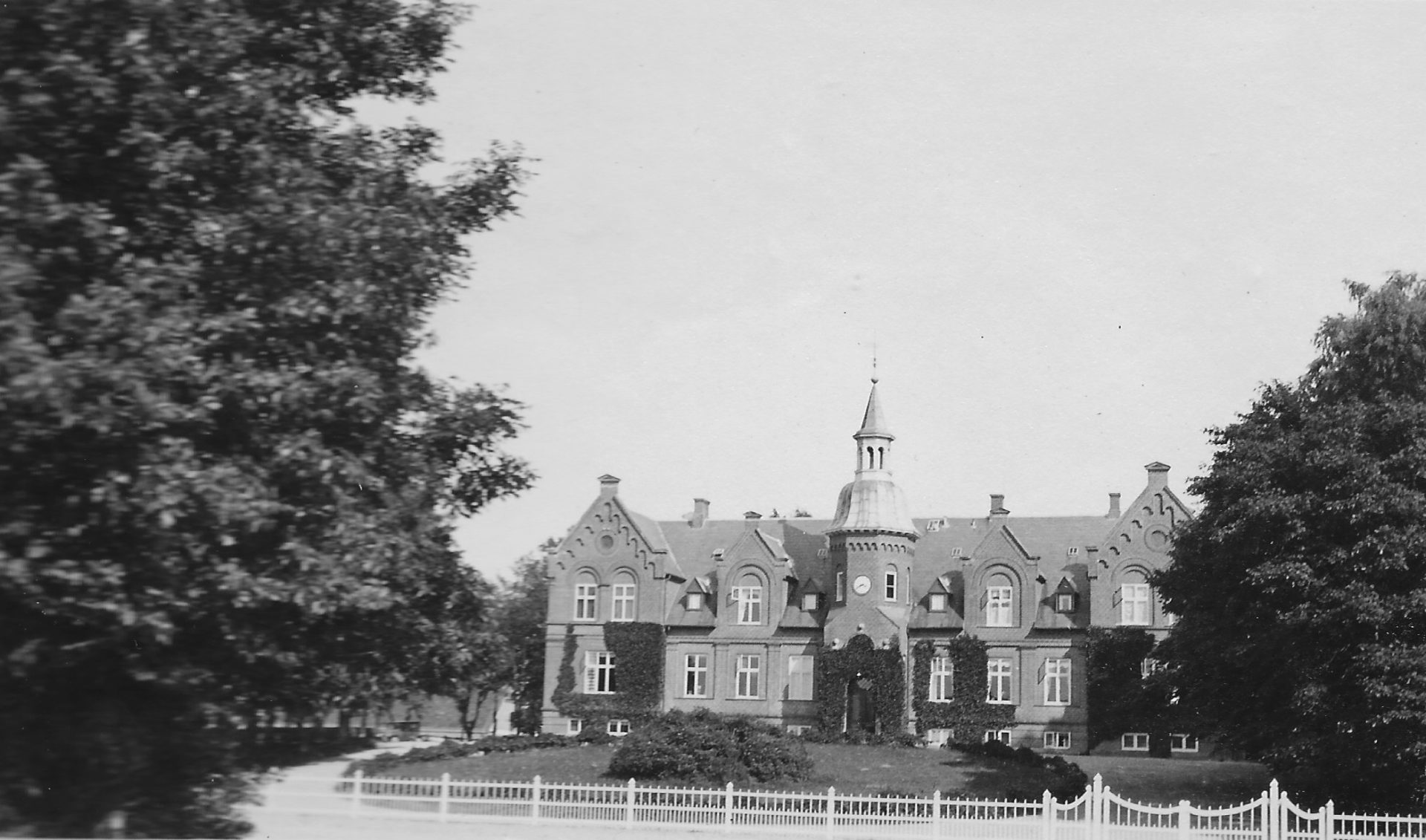
Stensbygaard.

In 1923, Stensbygård was acquired by Arnold Eugen Reimann. He was a grandson of the bank manager of the same name. He had a very fine herd of Danish Red and many experiments were carried out to promote good feeding and a high milk yield.

In 1923, Landmandsbanken appointed Reimann as board member of D/S Prient, and at the same time the bank decided to sell its shares in the company. The largest shareholders were Clarksons, London, D/S Norden and TORM, as well as the company's director Henrik Gether and Arnold Eugen Reimann, who from 1930 became deputy chairman. In 1925. he established the shipping company A/S Motortramp.

In 1946, with A/S Motortramp as a majority shareholder, D/S Orient engaged in a close operational collaboration with D/S Norden. In 1946, D/S Orient began to buy shares in D/S Norden. The acquisitions continued until Orient in 1955 had achieved the status of majority shareholder.

On 13 May 1956, Stensbygaard was transferred to an eponymous limited liability company (Stensbygaard A/S).

== Architecture ==
The present main building is constructed with one storey over a walk-out basement. A central octagonal tower and two short side wings project from the facade. The tower is topped by a spire with lantern.

== Today ==
The estate covers approximately 410 hectares of land of which 260 hectares are farmland and 150 hectares are forest.

== List of owners ==
- (1868–1897) Hans Peter Neergaard Terpager Malling
- (1897–1906) Vilhelm Peter Christian Bruun de Neergaard
- (1906–1910) Martin Oehlenslâger Wessel
- (1910–1913) Victor Albert Goldschmidt
- (1913–1923) G. Ree
- (1923–1956) Arnold Eugen Reimann
- (1956–present) tensbygaard A/S
