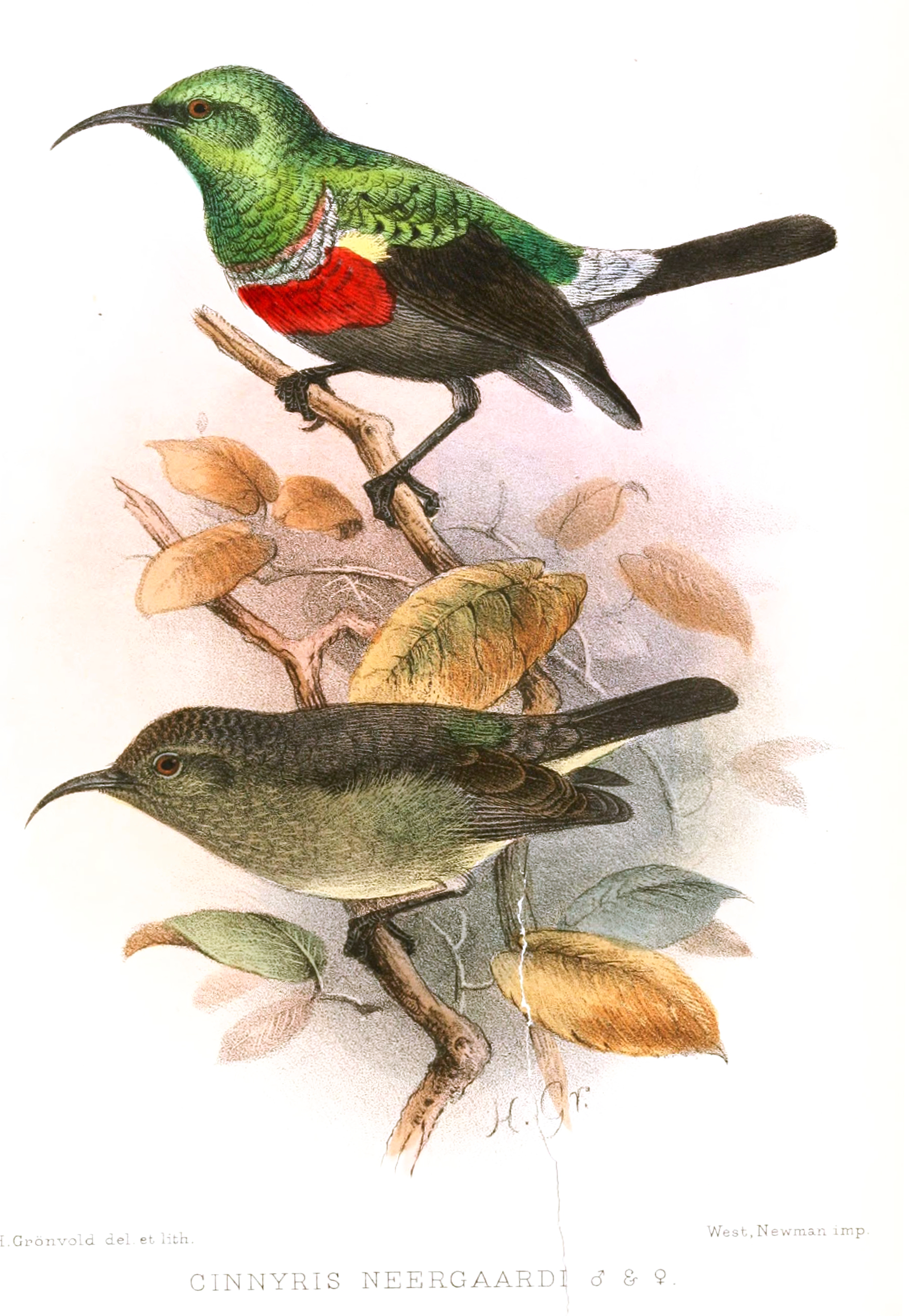

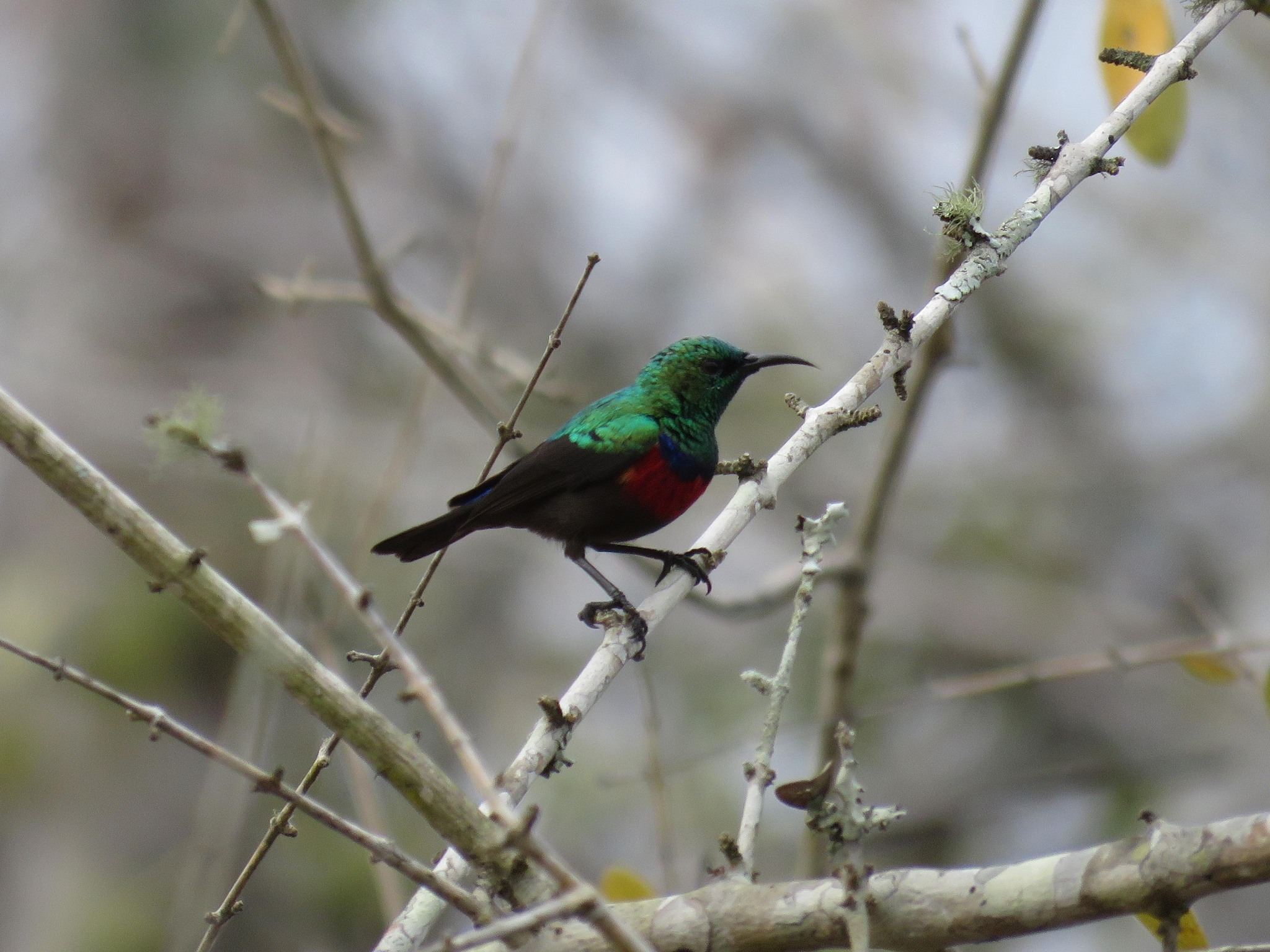

Conservation status
- Near Threatened (IUCN 3.1)

Scientific classification
- Kingdom: Animalia
- Phylum: Chordata
- Class: Aves
- Order: Passeriformes
- Family: Nectariniidae
- Genus: Cinnyris
- Species: C. neergaardi

Binomial name
- Cinnyris neergaardi C. H. B. Grant, 1908
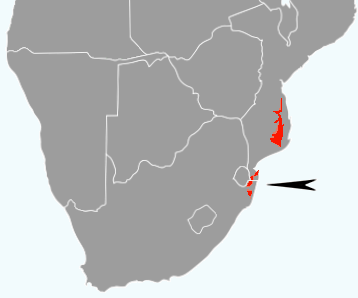
- endemic range

Synonyms
- Nectarinia neergardi (C. H. B. Grant, 1908)

= Neergaard's sunbird =

Species of bird

Neergaard's sunbird (Cinnyris neergaardi) is a species of bird in the family Nectariniidae. It is found in Mozambique and South Africa. Its natural habitat is subtropical or tropical dry forest near the coast, where it is threatened by habitat loss. It is named after Paul Neergaard, a Danish recruiting officer for the Wenela agency, who was stationed in southern Mozambique.

== Description ==
Neergaard's sunbird is a small species with a relatively short beak. The adult male has a metallic green head, back, and throat, black wings, a blue rump, and a brownish-black tail. It has yellow pectoral tufts, a narrow blue collar, a scarlet lower breast, and a black belly. The adult female has a greyish-brown head and upper parts, an olive-brown rump, and a dark brown tail. There is a pale supercilium over the eye, and the underparts are pale greyish brown. The eyes in both sexes are dark brown, and the beak and legs are black. The juvenile resembles the female.

== Ecology ==
Neergaard's sunbird feeds in the canopy, often in the company of the amethyst sunbird (Chalcomitra amethystina). It feeds on nectar, insects, and spiders.

== Status ==
Neergaard's sunbird has a limited range and a moderately small population. It is restricted to the coastal belt of Mozambique and South Africa between Inhambane in southern Mozambique and Richards Bay in northern KwaZulu-Natal in South Africa. There are two separate populations in Mozambique, one north of the Limpopo River and one south of Maputo. Its habitat is dry woodland, especially on sandy soil, and coastal scrub.

Although this bird is common at some of the locations where it occurs, the population is thought to be in decline because of habitat destruction, and the International Union for Conservation of Nature has assessed its conservation status as "near threatened".
