= Sparekassen for Ringsted og Omegn =

Danish savings bank

Sparekassen for Eingsted og Omegn was a savings bank in Ringsted, Denmark.

== History ==
The 19th century say the establishment of a great number of local savings banks in Denmark. The first savings bakin rural Zealand was established as Holbæk Amts Sparekasse in 1825. Sparekassen for Ringsted og Omegn was founded on 2 May 1832 at the initiative of byfogedtown bailiff (By og Herredsfoged) C. J. C. Harhoff (1786–1871).

The banl's first board consisted of Harhoff, cunstoms officer Christian Heimann and the local pastors Frederik Christian Ludvig Bentzon and Gerhard Giese. Heiman was later replaced by his successor, H. G. Fog, who died in 1838.Pastor F. L. Steenberg and the brothers Theodor and Jo0achim Bruun de Neergaard joined the board if managers in 1952. Other early board members were county manager F. Carstensen and landowner and miller M. Høeg.
