= Arnold Eugen Reimann (landowner) =

Danish landowner and businessman

Arnold Eugen Eeimann (15 April 1889 – 1 January 1956) was a Danish landowner and businessman. He founded the shipping company A/S Motortramp and was a majority shareholder in the shipping companies D(S Orient and D.(S Norden. He was the younger brother of Christiane Reimann. He owned Stensbygård on southern Zealand.

== Early life ==
Reimann was born on 15 April 1889 in Copenhagen as the second of four children of Carl Christian Frederik Reimann and Margit Meisterlin. His father was a successful broker. His paternal grandfather was the bank manager Arnold Wugen Reimann. His elder sister was the nurse Christiane Reimann.

== Landowner ==
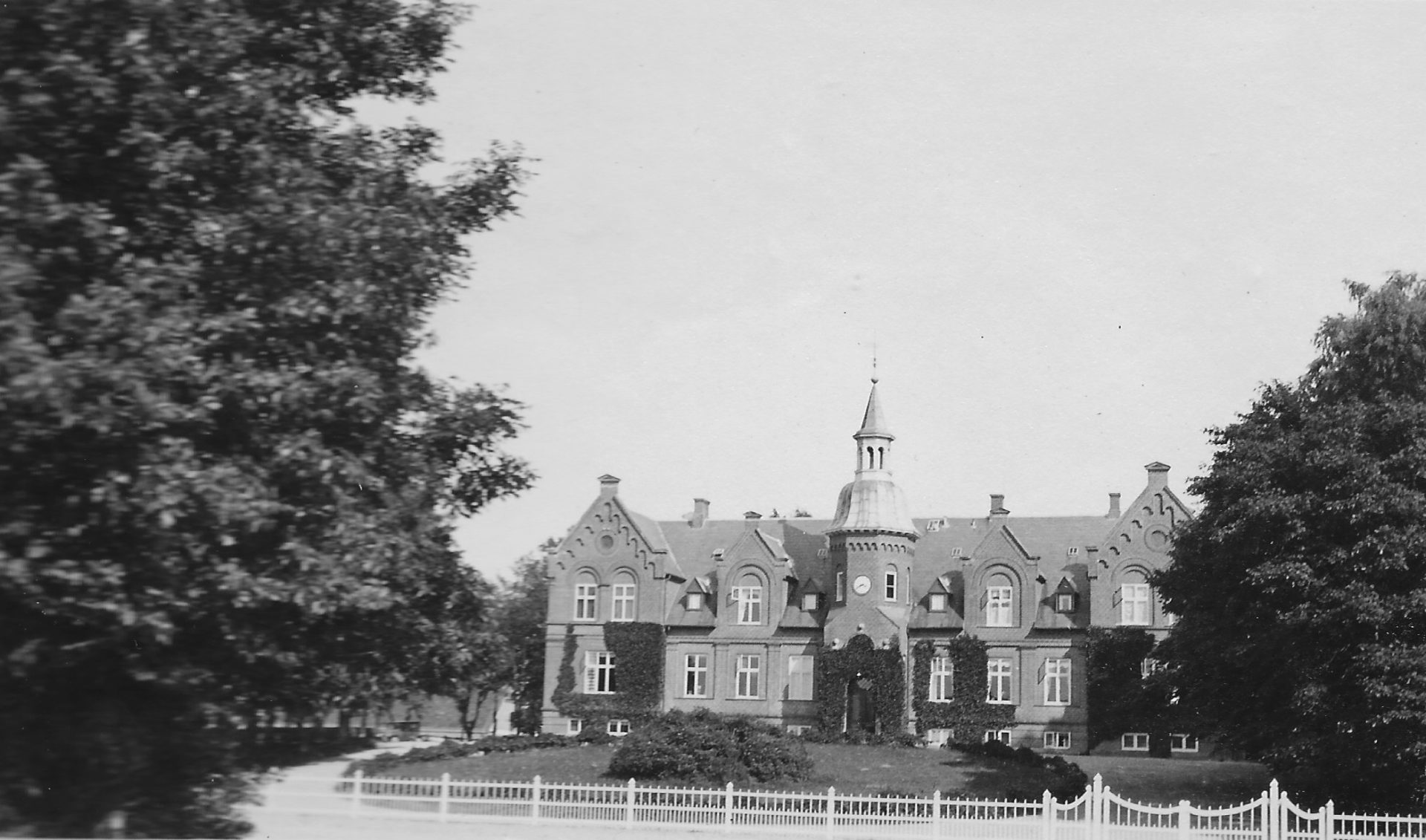
Stensbygaard.

In 1923, Reimann bought Stensbygård at Langebæj on the southern tip of Zealand. He had a very fine herd of Danish Red and many experiments were carried out on the estate to promote good feeding and a high milk yield.

== Shipping ==
In 1923, Reimann became a co-owner of D/S Orient. In 1925, he also established the shipping company A/S Motortramp. From 1930, he held the post as deputy Chairman of D/S Orient. He gradually increased his interests in the company.

In 1946, with A/S Motortramp as a majority shareholder, D/S Orient engaged in a close operational collaboration with D/S Norden. in 1946, D/S Orient began to buy shares in D/S Norden. The acquisitions continued until Orient in 1955 had achieved the status of majority shareholder.

== Personal life and legacy ==
Reimann was married to Gunvor Reimann. They had four daughters. D/S Orient merged in 1994 with the D/S Norden, formally with D&S Orient as the continuing company but under the D/S Norden name. Reimann's daughter, Alison Johanne F. Riegels, served as deputy chairman of D/S Norden for many years. In 2016, she was succeeded by her daughter Johanne Riegels Østergård. Johanne Riegels Østergaard and her sister Alison Riegels Melchior own 15 and 10 percent of D/S Norden, respectively. The foundation Aktieselskabet Dampskibsselskabet Orient's Fond, owns between 50 and 66 percent of A/S Motortramp, which in turn owns between 25 and 33 percent of D/S Norden. F/S Norden's former head office at Amaliegade 49 is also owned by the foundation.
