= Frede Christoffersen =

Danish painter and illustrator

Frede Christoffersen (15 April 1919 – 29 May 1987) was a Danish painter and illustrator.

== Biography ==
Born in Borup in central Zealand, Christoffersen spent a short period at the Copenhagen Arts and Crafts School before travelling to the Far East in 1940–41. The result was his 20 Smaa sorte Tegninger published in 1941. From 1942 to 1943, he studied at the Royal Danish Academy of Fine Arts, both at the graphic arts school and at the school of painting, under Aksel Jørgensen and Vilhelm Lundstrøm. In the early 1940s, he began to illustrate books including Nis Petersen's Digte (Poems) in 1942 and Ester Nagel's Mennesker (People, 1943). He also created coloured woodcuts and also produced book covers and posters but finally decided to concentrate on painting.

His Aften, Lumsås (1952), a Surrealistic depiction of the sun in solid colours of yellow-green, yellow, maroon, bright green and deep blue is typical of his painting style and is one of many works with the sun as the motif. He also created images of the night in dark tones with the moon's pale cool light. Many of his works were in small formats but he also produced larger paintings, as in his wall decorations for Copenhagen's De Danske Spritfabrikker (1956) and for Askov Højskole (1957). Like his wife Agnete Bjerre, he frequently exhibited his work at Den Frie Udstilling.

== Awards ==
In 1965, Frede Christoffersen was awarded the Eckersberg Medal and, in 1986, the Thorvaldsen Medal.

== Literature ==
- Elfelt, Kjeld (1941). 20 Smaa Sorte: Tegninger af Frede Christoffersen.
- Fischer, Erik (1983). Frede Christoffersen: sort hvide billeder. Brøndum.
- Peter Heiberg (1985): Frede Christoffersen: Tegnede og grafiske arbejder i tidsskrifter og bøger 1939–1983. 1985.
