= Jens Bruun de Neergaard =

Danish judge and landowner (1742–1788)

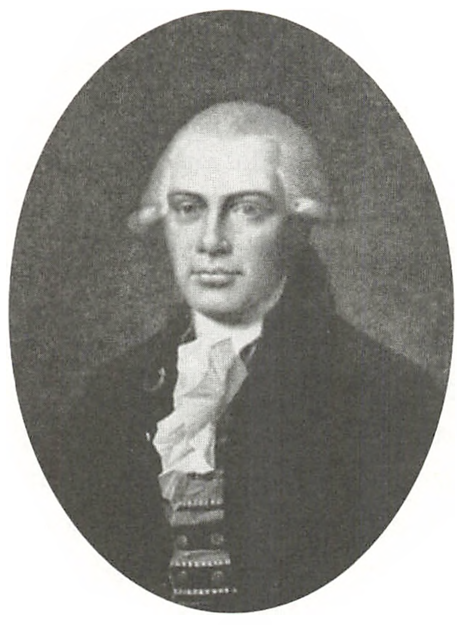
Jens Bruun de Neergaard.

Jens Bruun de Neergaard (14 June 1742 – 22 April 1788) was a Danish judge and landowner. He owned Svenstrup Manor, at Broup, Køge Municipality, whose present main building he constructed in the 1780s. On 31 May 1780, alongside his younger brother, Johan Thomas de Neergaard (1745–1806), he was ennobled by letters patent. His descendents are referred to as the "elder branch" of the Bruun de Neergaard family.

== Early life and education ==
Neergaard was born on 14 June 1742 at Ringsted Abbey, the eldest son of three children of Peter Johansen Neergaard and Kirsten Tønnesdatter Bruun. He was baptized on 18 June in Hellested Church. He completed his secondary schooling at Herlufsholm School in 1759, Ib On 19 June 1761, he earned a law degree (cand-jur.) from the University of Copenhagen.

== Career ==
After his graduation, Neergaard assumed a position as assistant (auskultant) in the Vestindisk-Guineiske Rente- og Generaltoldkammer. In 1762, he was appointed secretary of war. On 0 September 1763, he was appointed "real" justitsråd (as opposed to the honorary title). On 12 May 1769, he was appointed deputy judge of Zealand and Møn. On 10 May 1776, he was appointed etatsråd. On 3 May 1780, alongside his two siblings, he was ennobled by letters patent. On 10 September 1783, he was promoted to acting 2dn judge of Zealand and Møn. Less than a month later, on 1 October, he was promoted to real 2nd judge and acting 1st judge.

== Holdings ==
Neergaard was just 21 years old when his father presented him with Svenstrup Manor. In 1783, he constructed a new three-winged main building on the estate.

== Personal life ==
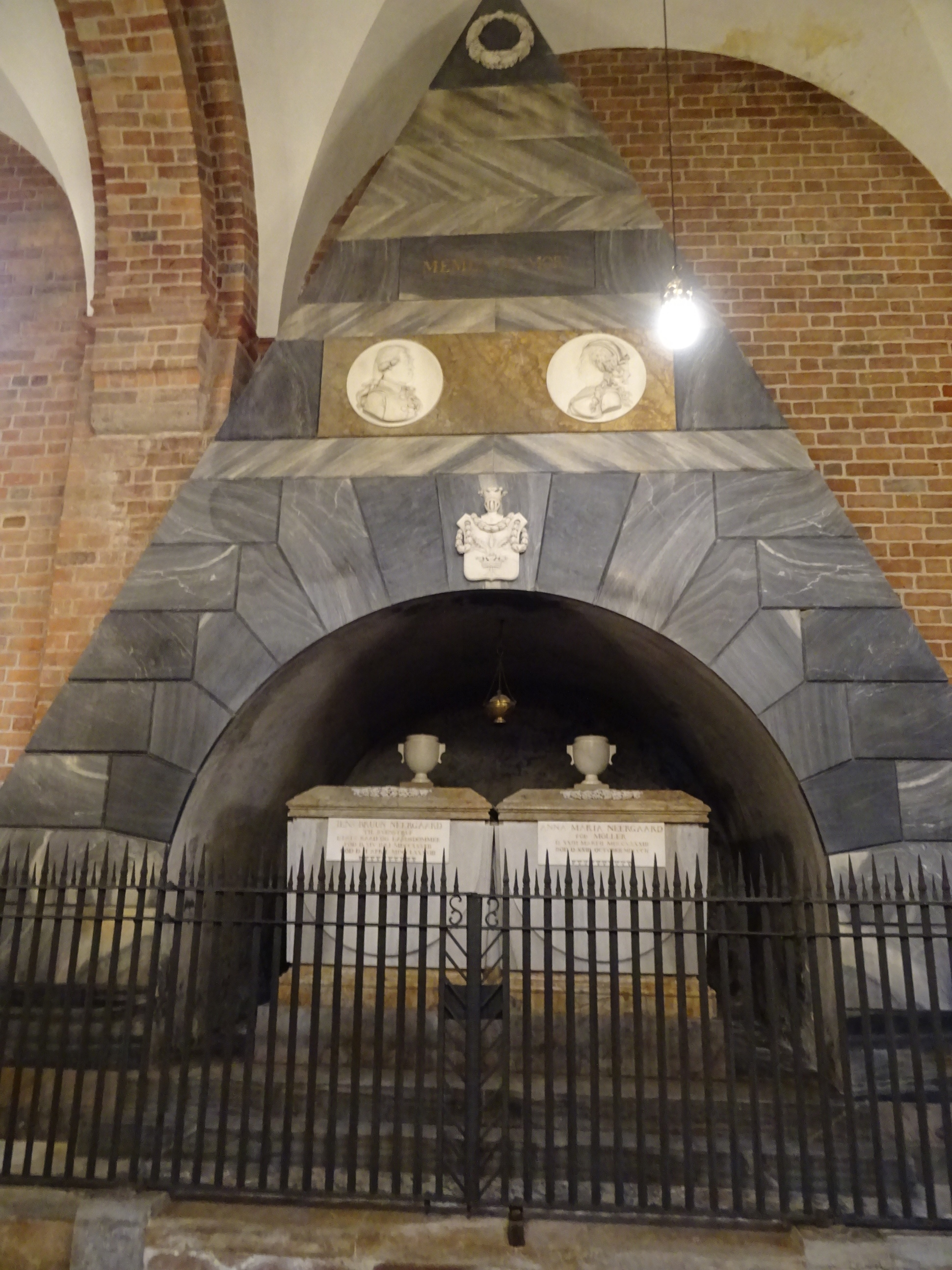
Neergaard's epitaph in St. Bendt's Church.

On 2 May 1763, Neergaard married Ane Marie Møller (1743–1802) in Our Lady's Chyurch in Copenhagen. She was the daughter of brewer and tanner Jens Andresen Møller and Ellen Cathrine Nørager. They had four children:

- Jens Peter Bruun de Neergaard (7 December 1764 – 7 January 1842)
- Johan Andreas Bruun de Neergaard (4 August 1770 – 2 July 1846)
- Tønnes Christian Bruun de Neergaard (26 November 1776 – 14 January 1824)
- Ellen Cathrine Kirstine Bruun de Neergaard (19 September 1777 – 19 July 1845)

Jens Bruun de Neergaard died on 22 April 1788 at Svenstrup Manor. He is buried in St, Bendt's Church. His epitaph in the church was created by Johannes Widevelt. It features two portrait reliefs en profile of Neergaard and his wife as well as the Neergaard family's coat of arms.
