= Frederik Oertz =

Danish county governor and court official

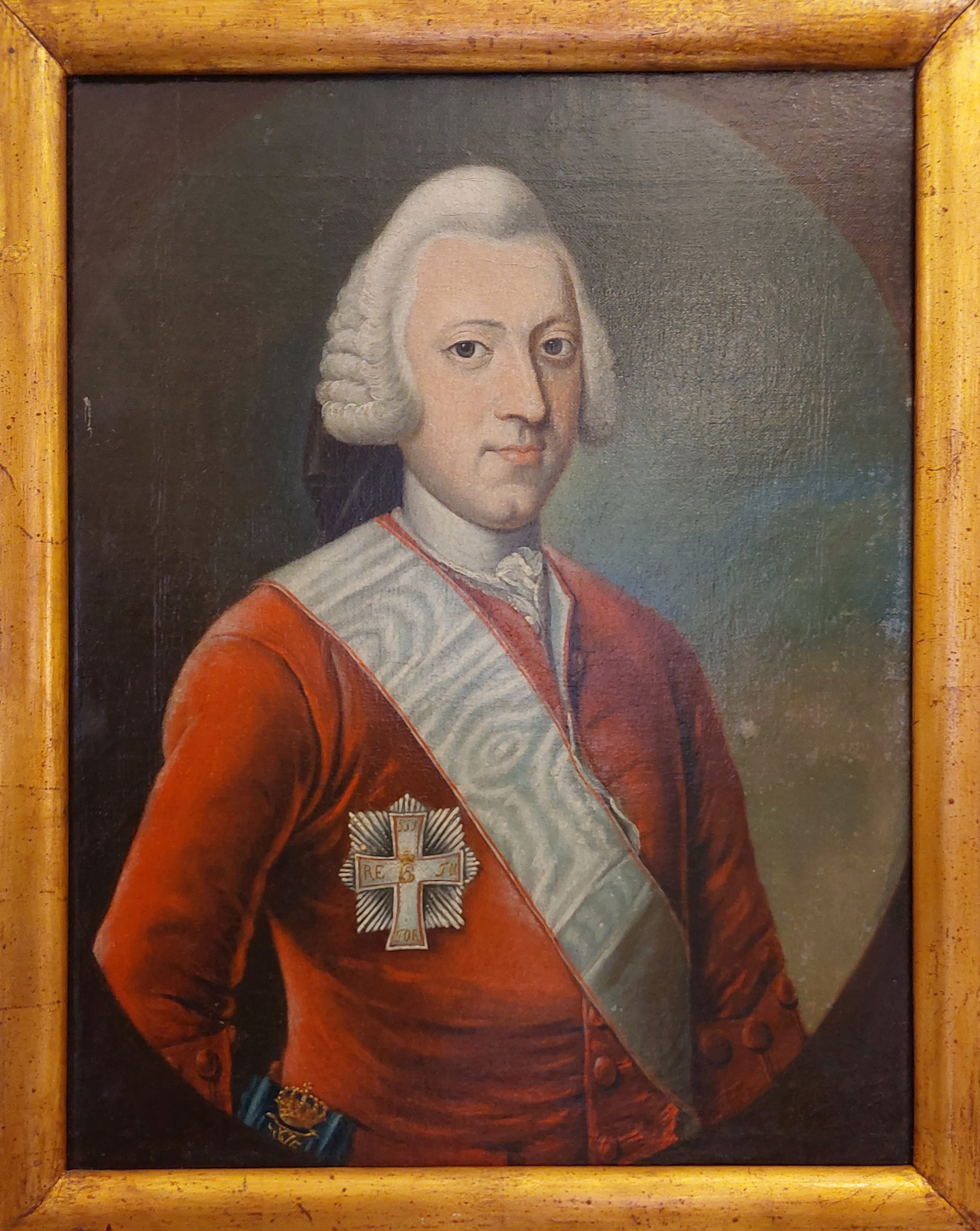
Portrait of Frederik Oertz in the Old Town Hall, Ribe

Frederik Oertz (1 July 1712 – 28 September 1779) was a Danish count, governor, and court official. He served as diocesan governor of Ribe in Jutland from 1750 to 1754 and as Master of the Ceremonies at the Royal Court in Copenhagen from 1754 to 1763.

== Early life ==
Oertz was born on 1 July 1712 to Baltasar Frederik Oertz and Charlotte Amalie, Countess Friis.

== Career ==
In 1725, he became a cornet in the Life Guard on Horseback. In 1731, he was appointed court page (kammerjunker).

From 27 February 1734 to 19 November 1737, he served as county governor of Roskilde County. From 19 November 1737 to 27 September 1746, he served as county governor of Koldinghus. From 10 November 1750 to 4 June 1754, he served as diocesan governor of Ribe and county governor of Riberhus. In 1754, he was appointed Master of the Ceremonies (Ceremonimester) at the royal court. In 1770, he was awarded the title of Geheimeråd. He retired in 1773.

== Personal life and property ==
On 5 August 1733, Oertz was married to Marie Svane (1698–1772), daughter and only child of former Master of the Royal Hunt Frederik Hansen Svane (1662–1730), a son of Hans Svane and the owner of Svenstrup Manor. Fourteen years Oertz's senior, Marie was previously married to Colonel Jesper Friis (1673–1716), head of the Funen Regiment. In the same year, now with the title of chamberlain, Oertz was elevated to count. The marriage was unhappy, and after just a few years entered bitter divorce proceedings that would last for the next 15 years. In 1744, a Supreme Court ruling ordered them to live together. In 1751, through the involvement of Christian VI (1699–1746) and bishop Hersleb, their marriage was finally dissolved. In the same year, Svenstrup was sold to Peter Johansen Neergaard.

In 1747, Oertz was created a Knight of the Order of the Dannebrog. On 25 April 1752, he married a second time to Sofie Amalie, countess Brockdorff (1728–1785). She was the daughter of Geheimrat Christian Frederik Brockdorff of Klethkamp and Ulrica Eleonore von Fölkersam. In 1761, he and his second wife were awarded the Ordre de l'Union Parfaite'. Oertz died on 28 September 1779.
