= Cabinet of Neergaard =

The Cabinet of Neergaard may refer to 3 Danish cabinets formed by Prime Minister Niels Neergaard:

- The Cabinet of Neergaard I (12 October 1908 – 16 August 1909)
- The Cabinet of Neergaard II (5 May 1920 – 9 October 1922)
- The Cabinet of Neergaard III (9 October 1922 – 23 April 1924)
