= Svenstrup (manor house) =

Manor house and estate in Køge, Denmark

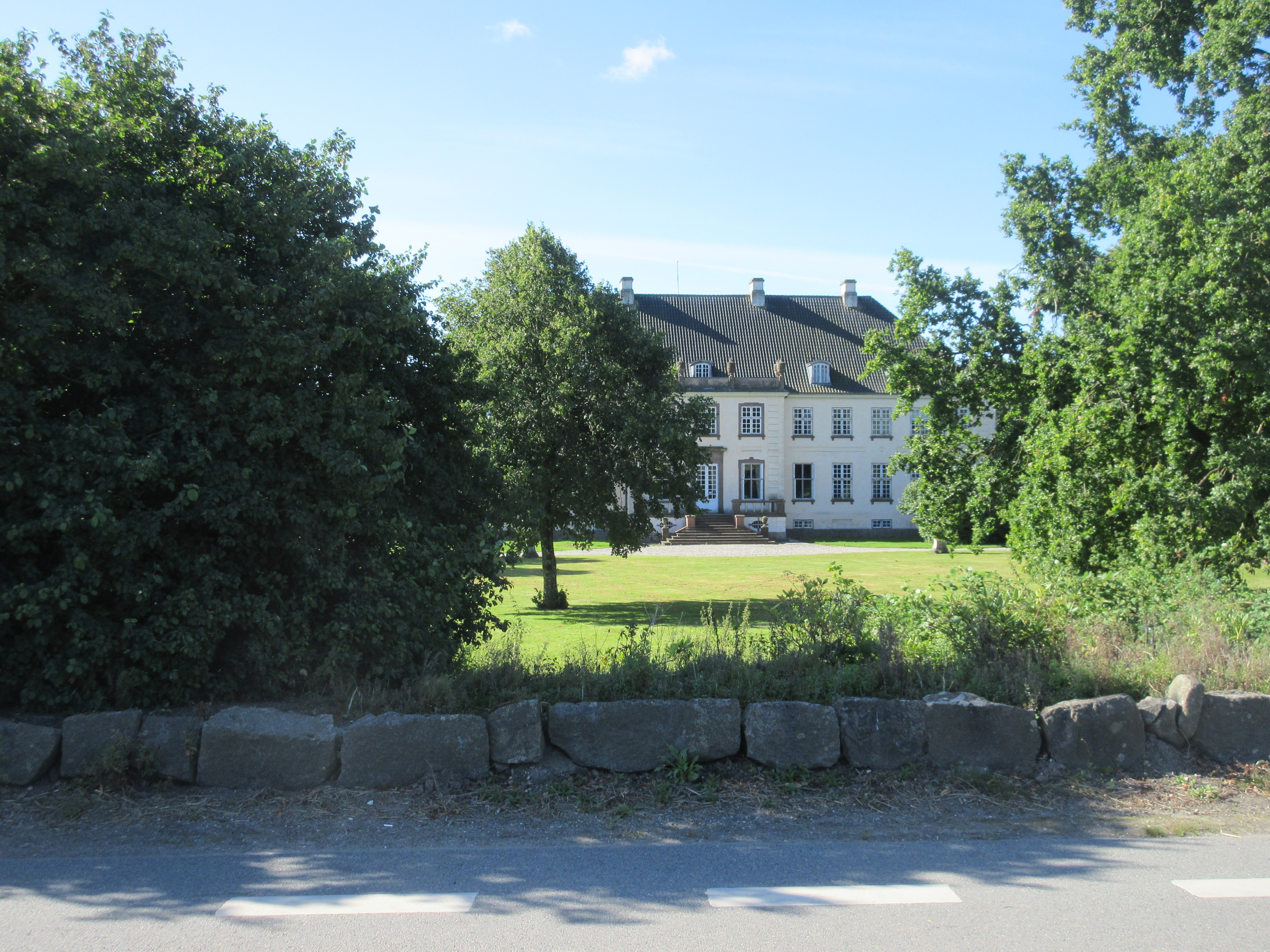
- Interactive map of the Svenstrup area

General information
- Location: Borupvej 100, 4140 Borup, Denmark
- Coordinates: 55°29′31.55″N 11°57′19.03″E
- Completed: 1782–84

Design and construction
- Architect: J.C. Kitzling

Svenstrup is a manor house and estate located close to Borup, Køge Municipality, some 50 kilometres southwest of Copenhagen, Denmark. It has belonged to members of the Neergaard/Wedell-Neergaard family since 1751.

== History ==
=== Church and Crown land ===
Svenstrup is first mentioned in the 13th century when it belonged to a widow named Ingerd Sunesen. In the Middle Ages, Svenstrup was a farm under Antvorskov Abbey. In 1454, it was ceded to Roskilde Biscopic in exchange for other land. In 1623, Bishop Lauge Urne sided with Dyke Frederick in the conflict with Christian II. Shortly thereafter, Svenstrup was looted and burnt down by Niels Pedersen Halveg, one of the king's loyal men.

After the Reformation in 1536, Svenstrup was confiscated by the crown and managed as a fief until 1666. Lensmen included Peder Basse (1615-18), Frederik Reedtz (1619-22) and Frederik Banner (1658-). The former fief was administrated by Johan Christoph von Körbitz in 1662 to 1666..

Frederick II used it as a hunting lodge from 1577. A new main building with lavish interiors was completed in 1584 but he died in 1588.

=== Svane and Oertz families ===
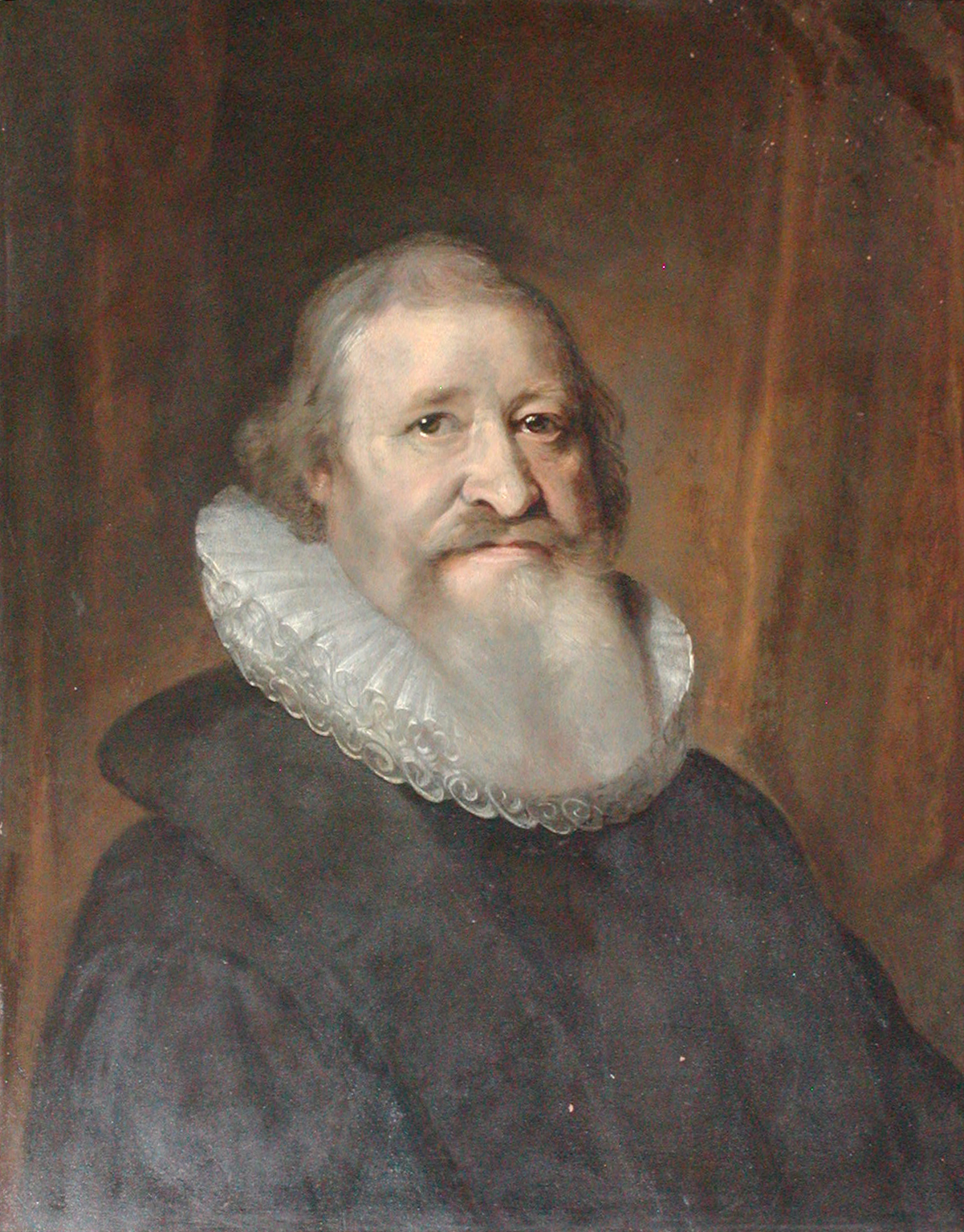
Hans Svane

In 1666, Frederik III (1609–1670) gave Svenstrup to Hans Svane, an arch bishop, who had supported the king in the introduction of the absolutism in 1660. Svane was also appointed to Supreme Court justice and member of statskollegiet. The estate, then one of the largest in the country, was granted status as a birk from 1678. Hans Svane died later that year but his widow Marie Fuiren kept the estate until 1687.

Hans and Margrethe Svane's granddaughter, Marie Svane, inherited Svenstrup in 1730. Her husband, Jesper Friis, had died in the Great Northern War (1700–1721).

In 1733, she married the 20 years younger army captain Frederik Oertz but the marriage was unhappy and after just a few years entered divorce proceedings that would last for the next 15 years and involve both Christian VI (1699–1746) and bishop Hersleb before the marriage was finally dissolved.

=== Neergaard family ===
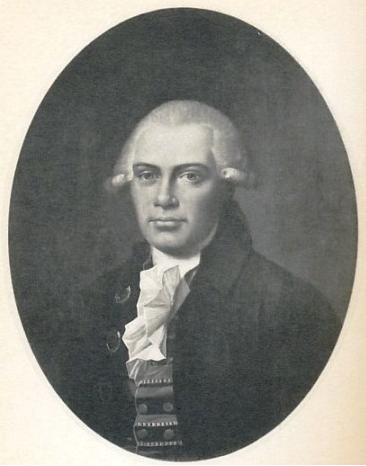
Jens Bruun de Neergaard

After the divorce, Frederik Oertz sold Svenstrup to Peter Johansen Neergaard who had been appointed to krigsråd. He managed the estate with great skill. His son, Jens Bruun Neergaard, constructed a new main building in 1780, the same year that he was ennobled under the name de Neergaard, and also expanded the estate through the acquisition of more land. Jens Bruun de Neergaard is also remembered for his literarydispute with the poet Johan Herman Wessel.

Jens Bruun de Neergaard's widow, Anna Marie Møller, kept the estate after his death in 1788. She implemented some of the agricultural reforms of the time in the years between 1791 and 1802 and bought Skjoldenæsholm.

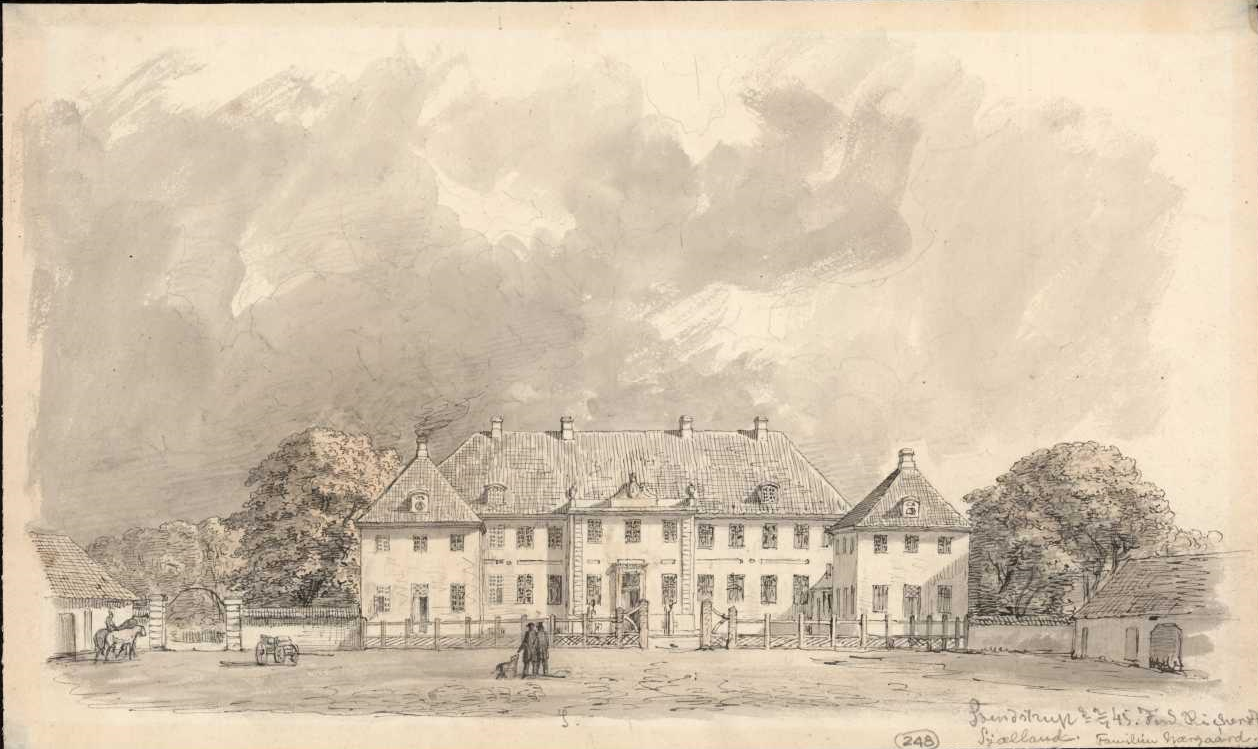
Svenstrup Manor by Ferdinand Richardt

In 1844, Johan Andreas de Neergaard turned Svenstrup into a fideikommis. His son Joachim Bruun de Neergaard took over Svenstrup in 1846 while the brother Andreas was given Skjoldnæseholm. The process of selling off tenant farms to the farmers did not begin until 1860 at Svenstrup.

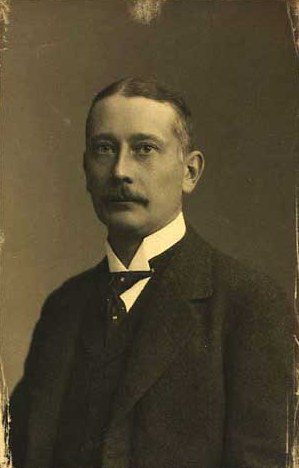
Joachim Wedell-Neergaard photographed by Julie Laurberg

Joachim Bruun de Neergaard was succeeded by his grandson, Joachim Wedell, who was granted royal permission to carry the name Wedell-Neergaard. He sold the last tenant farms in the 1900s, making Svenstrup the last manor in the country to complete this process. The fideikommisgodser was dissolved as a result of lensafløsningsloven in 1919. Joachim Wedell-Neergaard died in 1926. His widow Henny Caroline Julie Moltke passed the estate on to their son Christian Wedell-Neergaard in 1937.

== Today ==
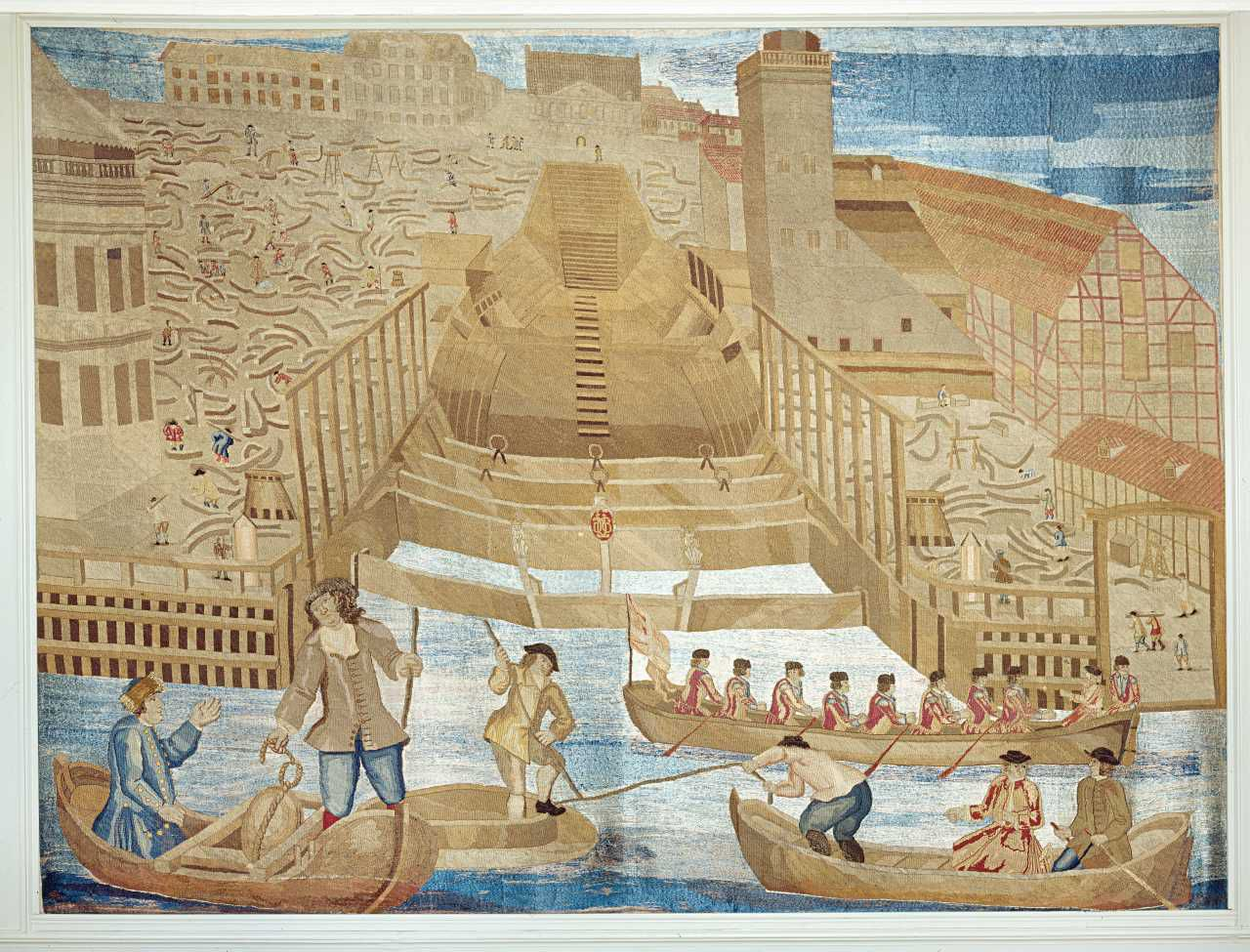
Tapestry from Skjoldnæseholm.

In April 2020, 29-year-old Maria Benedicte Wedell-Neergaard bought Svenstrup from her father for DKK 397 mio. with effect from 1 July 2020.

== Cultural references ==
Svenstrup was used as a location in the 1976 film Brand-Børge rykker ud.

== List of owners ==
- (died–1454) Antvorskov Kloster
- (1454–1536) Bishopric of Roskilde
- (1536–1539) Kronen (Roskildegård len)
- (1666–1668) Hans Svane
- (1668–1687) Marie Svane (née Fuiren)
- (1687–1730) Frederik Hansen Svane
- (1730–1733) Marie Friis /née Svane)
- (1733–1751) Frederik Oertz
- (1751–1763) Peter Johansen Neergaard
- (1763–1788) Jens Bruun de Neergaard
- (1788–1802) Ane Marie gift de Neergaard (née Møller)
- (1802–1846) Johan Andreas Bruun de Neergaard
- (1846–1893) Joachim Peter Christian Bruun de Neergaard
- (1893–1926) Joachim Wedell-Neergaard
- (1926–1937) Henny Caroline Julie Moltke
- (1937–1949) Christian Wedell-Neergaard
- (1949–1989) Jens Wedell-Neergaard
- (1989–present) Christian Jørgen Jens Wedell-Neergaard
- (2020-present) Maria Benedicte Wedell-Neergaard
