= Arnold Eugen Reimann (bank manager) =

Danish bank manager

A. E. Reimann, Arnold Eugen Reimann (24 February 1827 – 15 June 1888) was a Danish bank manager. He was the paternal grandfather of the landowner and businessman of the same name.

== Early life ==
Reimann was born on 24 February 1827 in Copenhagen, the son of bookkeeper Carl Christian Reimann (1798–1852) and Sina (Euphrosyne) Brigitta Peerhøy (1801–46). He was just 11 years old when he got a job at the customs office in Holbæk. After two years, he returned to Copenhagen to work at a sugar refinery.

== Career ==
In 1842, Reimann's father established a grocery business and a vinegar manufactory in Copenhagen. Shortly thereafter, Reimann gave up his job at the sugar refinery to assist his father in the family business. The mother's death in 1846 left the father unable to continue the business, leaving the son with full responsibility for the operations. In 1854, he was granted citizenship as a wholesaler (grosserer). When Kjøbenhavns private Laanebank was established in the same year—at the initiative of Industriforeningen in association with, amongst others, Christian August Broberg, Gottlieb Abrahamson Gedalia and Alfred Hage—Reiman was selected as the bank's first bank manager. He continued his private business until 1856.

In 1870, Reimann was elected to the Bank of Denmark's executive board. In 1873, he resigned from the Bank of Denmark to become one of the directors of the newly founded Københavns Handelsbank, alongside National Bank governor Wilhelm Sponneck (1815–88) and State Debt Director Martin Levy.

From 1872 to 1888, Reimann was a member of the Copenhagen City Council. In 1876, he was awarded the title of etatsråd. In 1887, he was created a Knight of the Order of the Dannebrog.

== Personal life ==
On 20 April 1850, Teimann was married to Christiane Frederikke Jacobsen (1830–1888). She was the daughter of grocer (høker) and later proprietor of Hotel Tre Hjorter Niels Jacobsen (c. 1787–1849, previously married Bolette Nielsdatter, ca.1771–1822 in 1819) and Cecilie Kirstine Larsen (1803–43). They were the parents of broker Carl Christian Frederik Reimann (1853–1929).

Reimann died on 15 June 1888 in Skovshoved. He is buried at Copenhagen's Assistens Cemetery.
