= International Seed Testing Association =

International non-profit organization

- Abbreviation: ISTA
- Formation: 1924
- Headquarters: Switzerland
- President: Ernest Allen
- Secretary General: Andreas Wais
- Website: www.seedtest.org

The International Seed Testing Association (ISTA) is an independent, non-profit organization founded during the 4th International Seed Testing Congress in 1924. Its members work to promote uniform methods of evaluating seeds being sold internationally to facilitate the international trading of seeds and to contribute to global food security. ISTA is involved in the development of internationally approved ISTA Rules for sampling and testing seed quality, laboratory accreditation and the promotion of seed science research and test development.

== History ==
Milestones in seed testing and ISTA’s history
Year	Milestone
1869	Friedrich Nobbe publishes his "Statute concerning the testing of agricultural seeds" regarded as the starting point for seed testing. The professor establishes the first seed testing station in Tharandt, Saxony.
1875	First meeting of Heads of seed testing stations in Graz.
1876	Nobbe publishes his famous Handbook of Seed Science and the motto of the meeting held in Hamburg that year was ‘uniformity in seed testing, later becoming the ISTA logo.
1921	Formation of the European Seed Testing Association. Experimentation and discussion begins aimed at producing uniform rules for seed testing
1924	26 countries participated in the meeting held in Cambridge and the International Seed Testing Association was founded. ISTA entrusted with preparation of the International Rules for Seed Testing
1931	At the congress in Wageningen, ISTA adopts the first ‘International Rules for Seed testing’ as well as establishing the ISTA Certificates scheme.
1950	The ISTA Congress was held in Washington, D.C., the first outside Europe, recognising the contribution of American seed technologists to the production of the ISTA Rules.
1995	During the ISTA Congress in Copenhagen, ISTA membership was opened to private laboratories and private seed companies. ISTA Laboratory Accreditation Standard approved.
1996	To ensure harmonised seed testing worldwide, ISTA initiated the Quality Assurance Programme to accredit seed testing laboratories. The first ISTA laboratory was audited under the new set-up this year.
2004	During the ISTA Congress in Budapest, it was agreed that accreditation should be considered a purely technical task, and the responsibility to give authorisation to issue ISTA International Certificates was given to the ISTA Executive Committee.

== Membership ==
ISTA’s membership currently consists of 207 member laboratories, 43 personal members and 56 associate members, from 76 countries/distinct economies worldwide (as of 2013). 127 of the ISTA Member Laboratories are accredited by ISTA and entitled to issue ISTA International Analysis Certificates.

Membership is open to anyone involved or interested in seed testing.

== Technical Committees ==
The principle objective of ISTA Technical Committees (TCOM) is to develop, standardise and validate methods for sampling and testing of seed quality, using the best scientific methods available. These tasks are subject-focused in the Technical Committees. The committees are made up of up to 15 seed scientists and technical specialists from different fields of research. The committee members may be based in seed testing laboratories, universities, research institutes or companies from all over the world.

Members of each TCOM work together, to develop and enhance the ISTA International Rules for Seed Testing. They carry out research to develop new or modified test methods, complete comparative studies and surveys and oversee validation of test methods. On the basis of their work, the TCOMs can propose changes to the ISTA Rules for Seed Testing. TCOMs are also responsible for organisation of seminars which provide a platform for presentation of new work in the subject area, and workshops, which provide training in test methods and opportunities for exchange of information, experience and ideas. Many TCOMs also produce Handbooks that supplement their Chapters in the ISTA Rules.

== Management ==
All changes to the ISTA Constitution and to the International Rules for Seed Testing are decided by, and voted for during, the ISTA Ordinary Meeting, which is held annually.

The voting rights of the Association are held by governments/distinct economies as recognised by international fora. The Designated Authority in each country/distinct economy appoints a Designated Member to execute its voting right at an ISTA Ordinary Meeting. A Designated Member is a Personal Member of the Association. There can be several Designated Members in a country/distinct economy, but only one Designated Member (by specific appointment of the corresponding Designated Authority) can execute the voting right on behalf of its Government at an ISTA Ordinary Meeting. The proposals for changes to the ISTA Rules or ISTA Constitution can be put forward by the Executive Committee, Technical Committees or any ISTA Member.

== International Rules for Seed Testing (ISTA Rules) ==
The ISTA Rules are the key element of ISTA’s vision to achieve uniformity on seed testing and include testing methods for seeds designated for crop or plant production. All published methods have undergone validation studies to ensure that test procedures give reliable and repeatable results. Following agreement between ISTA’s member countries, the validated methods are included in the ISTA Rules. The ISTA Rules are approved and amended at the ISTA Ordinary Meetings, on the basis of advice from the ISTA Technical Committees. The procedures for validation of test methods are given in the ISTA Method Validation Programme.

The ISTA Rules include 19 chapters describing principles and definitions in detail. They cover numerous agricultural crops, flower, tree, shrub, medicinal and herbage species from throughout the world. They also provide standard methods for sampling of seed lots so that there is a direct connection between the seed lots from which the sample was drawn and the results of quality test conducted on that seed lot.

All the requirements of the ISTA Rules must be followed when test results are to be reported on an ISTA Seed Lot Certificate.

== ISTA Seed Lot Certificates ==
The International Seed Analysis Certificates can only be issued by accredited member laboratories of ISTA following testing or sampling in accordance with up-to-date ISTA Rules. When seed test results are reported on ISTA International Seed Lot Certificate, the issuing laboratory guarantees that the sampling and testing have been carried out in a manner conforming with ISTA Rules i.e. using methods that have been validated, internationally harmonised and voted on by the ISTA membership.

== ISTA Method Validation Programme ==
The organization's method validation programme is meant to lay out a system allowing the validation of recently developed test methods, the comparison of equivalent test methods and the evaluation of existing methods for the evaluation of seed quality.

The process of method validation ensures that a method is fit for purpose, that the description of a method is concise and complete, and that the procedure gives accurate and repeatable results in accordance with the given specifications of the test method. It also, where appropriate, confirms the relationship between the results of a quality test and a practical expression of seed quality.

== Laboratory Accreditation ==
The goal of ISTA Accreditation is to confirm that a laboratory is capable of carrying out seed testing procedures in accordance with the ISTA Rules. Accredited laboratories must prove that they run a quality assurance system up to par with the ISTA accreditation standards. Accredited laboratories are permitted to issue ISTA International Seed Lot Certificates.

Only ISTA Member Laboratories can be accredited. Prior to accreditation, laboratories have to demonstrate their ability to carry out seed testing in accordance with ISTA Rules by participating in the Proficiency Test Programme. The process of Accreditation involves verification of a laboratory's technical competence by an audit team against established audit criteria. Criteria are formulated in the ISTA Accreditation Standard. Accredited laboratories are re-audited at regular intervals.

Testing of seeds by an accredited laboratory indicates that seeds have been tested by internationally accepted methods. In certain countries, the import of seed is only authorized if the seed lot is accompanied by an ISTA Certificate. Accredited laboratories are obliged to participate in relevant proficiency test rounds. Failure in the proficiency test programme may lead to suspension of the accreditation.

== ISTA Accreditation standard for seed testing and seed sampling ==
The ISTA Laboratory Accreditation Standard is based on international accreditation standards for testing and calibration laboratories ISO/IEC 17025.

== ISTA proficiency tests ==
The goal of the ISTA Proficiency Test Programme is:

"to identify those laboratories that do not meet the minimum standard of performance that is reasonably expected from an ISTA accredited laboratory and to determine if such laboratories are taking reasonable corrective action to bring their performance standard to at least the minimal level."

Any ISTA member laboratory is eligible to take part in the programme, with participation being mandatory for any ISTA accredited member laboratory and optional for non-accredited laboratories seeking to benchmark themselves with accredited ones and prepare for future accreditation. Non-members may take part a flat fee determined by the association.

== Seed Science and ISTA ==
ISTA promotes seed science though publication of Seed Science and Technology, the work of the Technical Committees, in its triennial Seed Symposium and the work of the Seed Science Advisory Group.

The ISTA Seed Symposium is held as part of the triennial ISTA Congress and provides a forum for the interaction of applied seed scientists and technical experts. Five sessions, held over three days, include both oral and poster papers on a wide range of topics related to seed science and technology.

== Publications ==
- International Rules for Seed Testing: The ISTA Rules for Seed Testing form the primary means by which uniformity in seed testing is promoted and lay down standard methods and procedures for seed sampling and testing.
- Seed Testing International: Seed Testing International (ISTA News Bulletin) includes reports from the ISTA President, the Technical Committees and the Secretariat as well as articles addressing issues of technical interest, laboratory accreditation, reports from a number of meetings and workshops, and news. Two issues are published biannually (April/October). It is distributed to all ISTA Members and over 2000 addresses. Seed Testing International is free of charge and can be ordered online.
- Seed Testing Handbooks: The ISTA Technical Committees write technical handbooks which give background information and detailed advice on seed testing procedures.
- Seed Science and Technology: Seed Science and Technology (SST) is an international journal presenting original research papers and review articles concerning everything from seed quality and production to processing, genetic conservation, distribution, storage and testing. It is available online and open access.

== International Cooperation ==
As a worldwide association, ISTA works with many regional and international organizations such as:

- African Seed Trade Association (AFSTA)
- Association of Official Seed Analysts (AOSA)
- Asia and Pacific Seed Association (APSA)
- American Seed Trade Association (ASTA)
- European Commission (EC)
- European Seed Association (ESA)
- Food and Agriculture Organization of the United Nations (FAO)
- Federacion Latinoamericana de Asocianciones de Semillas (FELAS)
- International Center for Agricultural Research in Dry Areas (ICARDA)
- International Laboratory Accreditation Cooperation (ILAC)
- International Seed Federation (ISF)
- International Organization for Standardization (ISO)
- Seed Schemes Organization for Economic Co-operation and Development (OECD)
- International Union for the Protection of New Varieties of Plants (UPOV)
- World Trade Organisation (WTO)
