= Paul Neergaard =

Danish agronomist, mycologist and agriculturist

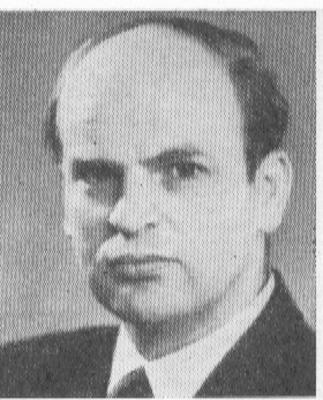
- Born: February 19, 1907; Nyborg
- Died: November 13, 1987 (aged 80); Copenhagen
- Organization: Academy of Esperanto
- Known for: Agronomy
- Notable work: Seed Pathology (1977); Annotated List of Seed-borne Diseases (1990)

Pierre Paul Ferdinand Mourier de Neergaard (February 19, 1907 – November 13, 1987) was a Danish agronomist, mycologist and agriculturist. Paul Neergaard is considered the father of seed pathology and, along with Scottish seed pathologist Mary Noble coined the term in the 1940s.

== Biography ==
Neergaard was training in seed pathology at the Royal Veterinary and Agricultural University in Copenhagen, Denmark (B.Sc., 1932; Ph.D., 1935; Sc.D, 1945). He served as director of the Danish Government Institute of Seed Pathology for Developing Countries in Copenhagen. From 1956 to 1974 he served as the chairman of the Plant Disease Committee of the International Seed Testing Association (ISTA). During his tenure as the chair of the ISTA, he helped standardize methods for detecting seed-borne fungi.

Neergaard authored a two-volume text entitled Seed Pathology (1977), that focused on a wide variety of seed pathology issues, ranging from the economic significance of seed-borne diseases to the assessment of seed-borne inoculum. It has served as a reference and teaching standard for the science of seed pathology throughout the world. Along with Mary Noble and Jo deTempe, he produced Annotated List of Seed-borne Diseases (4th edition, ISTA, 1990).

Neergaard was a professor at universities in Beirut (Lebanon) and Mysore (Karnataka, India). and was a member of several national academies and international societies.

Paul Neergaard was an active promoter of the international language Esperanto. He was a member of the Academy of Esperanto and published several books in that language about science and linguistics.

== Selected works ==
- Seed Pathology (John Wiley & Sons, 1977)
- Annotated List of Seed-borne Diseases (4th edition, ISTA, 1990)
- 1.-15. Årsberetning fra J. E. Ohlsens Enkes plantepatologiske laboratorium.

=== In Esperanto ===
- Atakoj kontraŭ ĝardenplantoj
- La vivo de la plantoj (The life of plants)
- Terminaro Hortikultura (in six languages)
- Eta Krestomatio
- Tra Densa Mallumo
- Fremdvortoj en Esperanto
- Scienco kaj Pseŭdoscienco pri Heredo kaj Raso
- La Esperantologio kaj ties Disciplinoj. Taskoj kaj Rezultoj
