= Gottlieb Abrahamson Gedalia =

Danish banker (1816–1892)

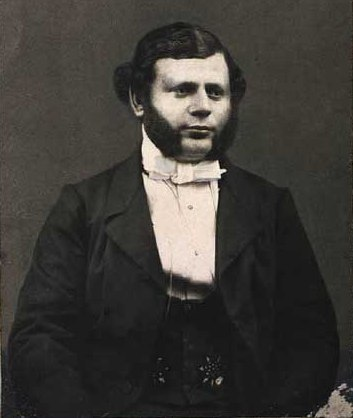
G. A. Gedalia.

Gottlieb Hartvig Abrahamson Gedalia (13 April 1816 – 10 March 1892) was a Jewish Danish banker, co-founder of Landmandsbanken. He owned the building at the corner of Højbro Plads and Gammel Strand in Copenhagen. In 1875, he went bankrupt.

== Early life and education ==
Gedalia was born on 13 April 1816 in Copenhagen, the son of Hartvig Abrahamson Gedalia (c. 1778– 1858) and Henriette Nathan Jacobsen (1785-1863). His great-grandfather Abraham Gedalia Levin and grandfather Abraham Gedalia (1752–1827) both had served as chief rabbis for the Jewish congregation in Copenhagen. His father was a merchant. Gedalia was trained as a saddler and worked for a few years as a journeyman in various workshops.

== Career ==
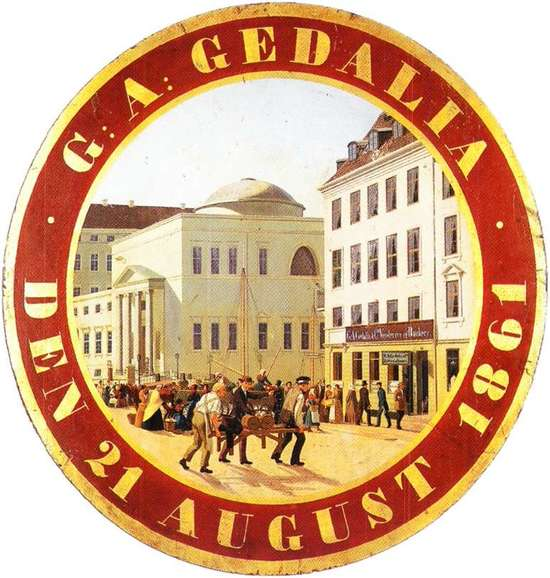
Membership target donated by Gedalia to the Royal Danish Shooting Society when he became a member.

In order to supplement his modest earnings, Gedalia began engage in small-scale speculation in shares and bonds. The trade took hold, stimulated by his energy and obvious talent for the industry. In May 1849, he established the firm Gedalia & Co. on the corner of Højbro Plads and Gammel Strand.

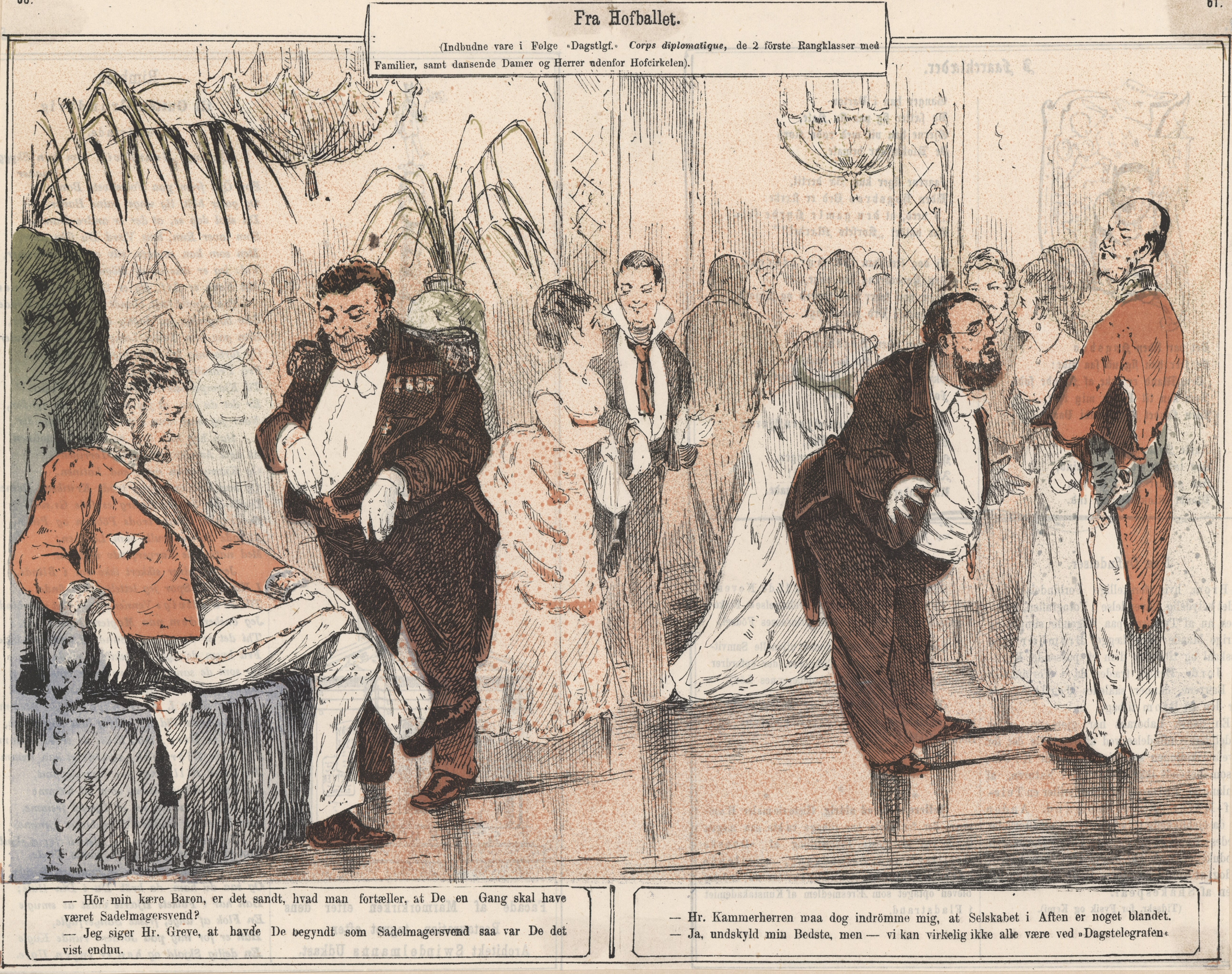
Caricature of Gedalia, 1875.

Gedalia had a reputation for being extremely vain, talkative, bragging and tactless. This made him a well-known character in the streets of Copenhagen and a favourite victim of the popular comic magazines of the time. On the other hand, he was also good-natured and extremely helpful to those in need. His business developed over the years into one of the most successful in the country, and he enjoyed great trust both locally and abroad. He became Portuguese Consul General in 1866, and in 1870 he bought a baronial title in San Marino. He often engaged in discussions with foreign diplomats in Copenhagen. In around 1870, Spain engaged him in negotiations with Christian IX's brother, Prince Hans, about taking over the throne of Spain. As early as the 1850s, he was working on plans for the establishment of a large private bank in Copenhagen, but they were delayed by C. F. Tietgen's Privatbanken, and it was not until around 1860 he found the time right for a new attempt, which in 1871 resulted in the foundation of Landmandsbanken. Gedalia engaged his old employee Isak Glückstadt as director.

in the early 1870s, Gedalia was also involved in some of the large infrastructure projects of the time. Some of them, including the construction of the Vendsyssel Railway and port facilities in a number of provincial towns, resulted in huge profits. The new Northwest Railway on Zealand, on the other hand, would become the beginning of his deroute. He suffered heavy losses on the project, turned to Tietgen in vain for help from the Privatbanken and finally left the country in 1875 as a bankrupt man. He decided to emigrate to the United States in search of new opportunities but ended up returning to Denmark at the end of the year. Loans from friends enabled him to start a new banking business. However, he never reached his old level of success. The stock exchange was closed to him, and despite a persistent struggle over many years, he never got there again. His last year was sad and bitter.

== Personal life ==
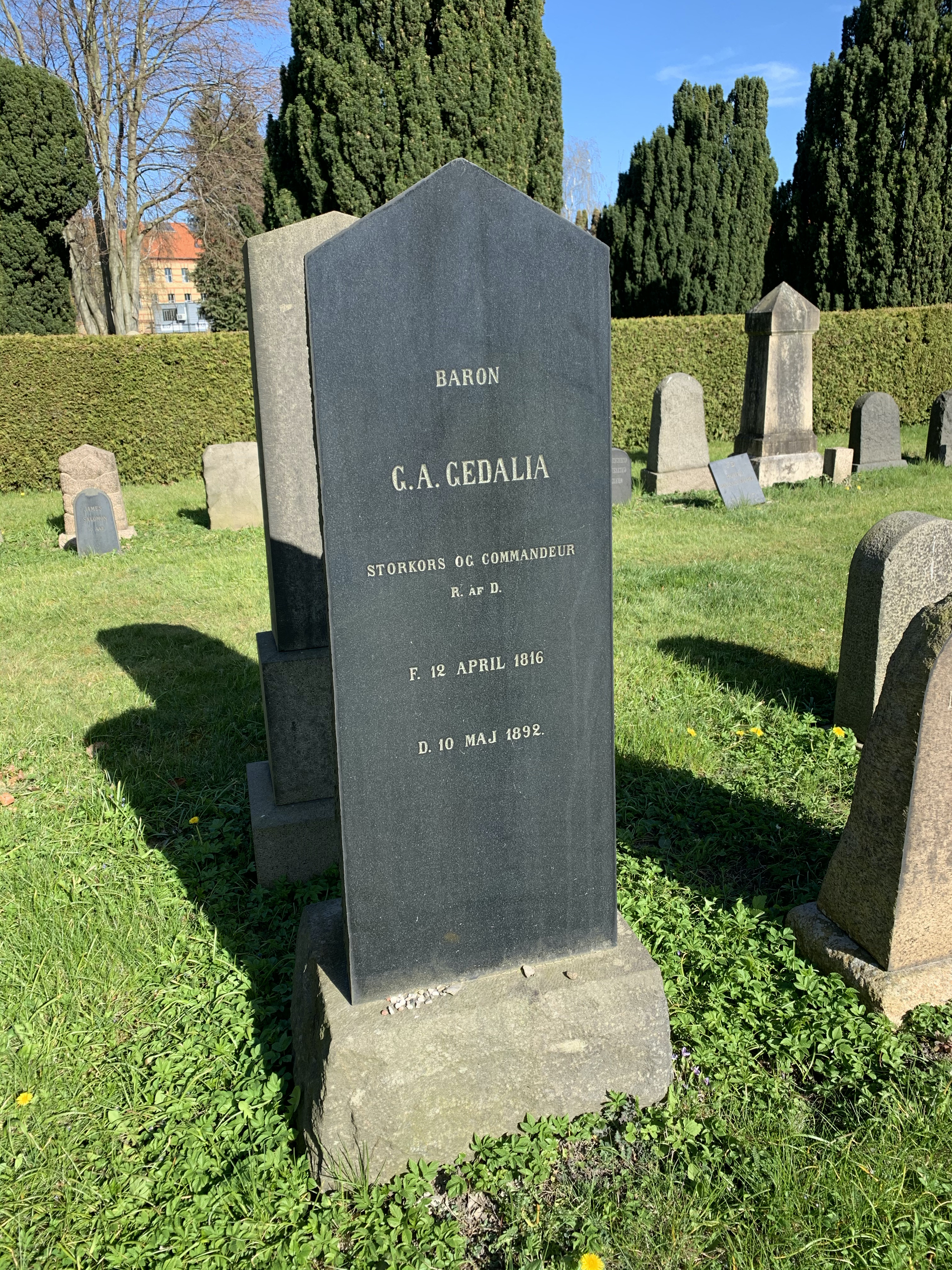
Gedalia's grave in the Jewish Western cemetery.

On 3 December 1842, he married Helene (Rebekka) Cathrine Lundquist (1819-1888). She was the daughter of master klein smith (klejnsmedemester) Peter Lundqvist (c. 1774–1845) and Maren Rebekka Lind (c. 1781–1826).

He was a member of the Royal Copenhagen Shooting Society. He died on 10 March 1892 and is buried in the Copenhagen's Jewish Western Cemetery.
