= Joachim Wedell-Neergaard =

Danish diplomat

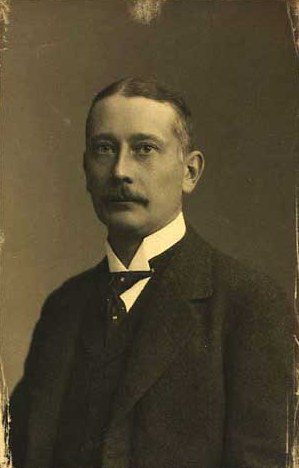
- Wedell-Neergaard photographed by Julie Laurberg
- Born: 11 January 1862; Næstved, Denmark
- Died: 4 January 1926 (aged 63); Svenstrup, Denmark
- Occupation: Landowner
- Awards: 2nd-Class Commander of the Dannebrog

Joachim Wedell-Neergaard, née Wedell-Wedellsborg (11 January 1862 – 4 January 1926) was a Danish diplomat, landowner and chamberlain. The son of Gustav Wedell-Wedellsborg and Louise Elise Henriette Bruun de Neergaard, on 19 June 1893 he was granted royal permission to carry the name Wedell-Neergaard. In the same year, he had succeeded his maternal grandfather as owner of Svenstrup Manor at Borup. He was president of the Danish Forest Association from 1906 to 1916.

== Early life and career ==
He was born on 11 January 1862 in Næstved where his father Gustav, Baron Wedell-Wedellsborg (1829-1903), a son of Joachim, Baron Wedell-Wedellsborg, served as a first lieutenant in the Dragoon Regiment. His mother, Louise Elise Henriette Bruun de Neergaard (1837–64), a daughter of Joachim Bruun de Neergaard of Svenstrup Manor, died when he was just two years old. His father resigned from the army the following year to lease Overdrevsgård, a farm under his father-in-law's estate.

Wedell-Neergaard completed his schooling in 1881 and graduated from the University of Copenhagen in political science (statsvidenskab) in 1886. He then worked for the Ministry of Foreign Affairs, both at home and abroad.

== Landowner ==
Wedell-Neergaard succeeded his maternal grandfather as the owner of Svenstrup in 1893. He immediately launched a number of construction projects and significantly improved the management of the land. He took a particular interest in forestry.

He publishedSvenstrup. El sjællandsk Gods' Historie (1921) with contributions by himself and other writers.

== Other activities ==
Wedell-Neergaard was president of the Danish Forest Association ( Dansk skovforening) from 1906 ro 1816. He was chairman of the local parish council in 1898-1908 and a member of the Country Council in 1901–16. He was director of Carlsen-Langes Legatstiftelse.

He wrote a number of article about forestry, including contributions to Dansk Skovforening 1888-1913. He was made an honorary member of the Danish Forest Association in 1916 and of the Swedish Forest Association (skogsvårdsföreningen) in 1919.

== Personal life ==
Wedell-Neergaard married Countess Henny Caroline Julie Moltke (29 March 1873 - 2 September 1954), a daughter of Christian, Count Moltke (1833-1918) and Caroline A., Countess Danneskiold-Samsøe (1843–76), on 21 July 1896 at Lystrup Manor.

Wedell-Neergaard died on 4 January 1926 and is buried at Borup Cemetery. He left two children. The daughter Else Louise Thalia, Baronesse Wedell-Neergaard married Tage Rudolph Baron Reedz-Thott (1886-1971). The son Christian, Baron Wedell-Neergaard succeeded his father as owner of Svenstrup. He married Manon Christiane Olga Schimmelmann,

== Accolade ==
Wedell-Neergaard was created a Member of the Royal Gunt (Hofjægermester) in 1897 and chamberlain ( Kammerherre) in 1914. He was created a Knight in the Order of the Dannebrog in 1896 and a Commander of the Second Class in 1924. He received the Cross of Gonour in 1918.
