= Borup, Køge =

Borup
- town
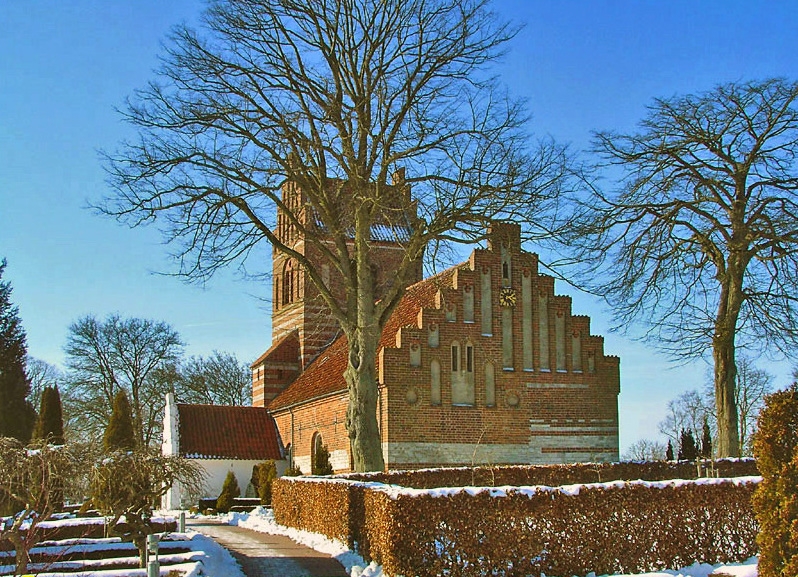
- Borup church

- Location in Denmark Borup (Denmark Region Zealand)
- Coordinates: 55.49592°N 11.97789°E
- Country: Denmark
- Region: Zealand (Sjælland)
- Municipality: Køge

Area
  - Urban: 2.8 km^{2} (1.1 sq mi)

Population (2026)
  - Urban: 5,063
  - Urban density: 1,800/km^{2} (4,700/sq mi)
  - Gender: 2,468 males and 2,595 females
- Time zone: UTC+1 (CET)
  - Summer (DST): UTC+2 (CEST)
- Postal code: DK-4140 Borup

Borup is a railway town in Zealand, Denmark. It lies about 40 km southwest of Copenhagen on the railroad between Roskilde and Ringsted. It is located in Køge Municipality in Region Zealand. With a population of 5,063 (1 January 2026), it is the second largest town of the municipality.

== Etymology ==
Borup is the evolution and shortening of what would be Bythorp in English. In other words, the place name is based on two words having the meaning of "dwelling place."

== History ==
Borup was originally a village that, around the year 1800, consisted of 5 farms in addition to the parsonage and 10 houses; all (apart from the parsonage) were tenant farmers under the manor house and estate of Svenstrup. After the opening of the railway line in 1856, a railway town quickly developed around the railway station.

In 1967, Borup was known for an air-raid shelter built at the town by the doomsday cult The Orthon cult.

On 1 April 1970, Borup became the municipal seat of Skovbo Municipality, until it was merged with Køge Municipality on 1 January 2007.

== Geography ==
Borup is located in east central Zealand, 14 km west of Køge, 11 km northeast of Ringsted, and 18 km southwest of Roskilde - between the two small lakes Borup Lake (Danish: Borup Sø) on the western outskirts of the town and the larger Kimmerslev Lake (Danish: Kimmerslev Sø) on the southeastern outskirts.

== Transport ==
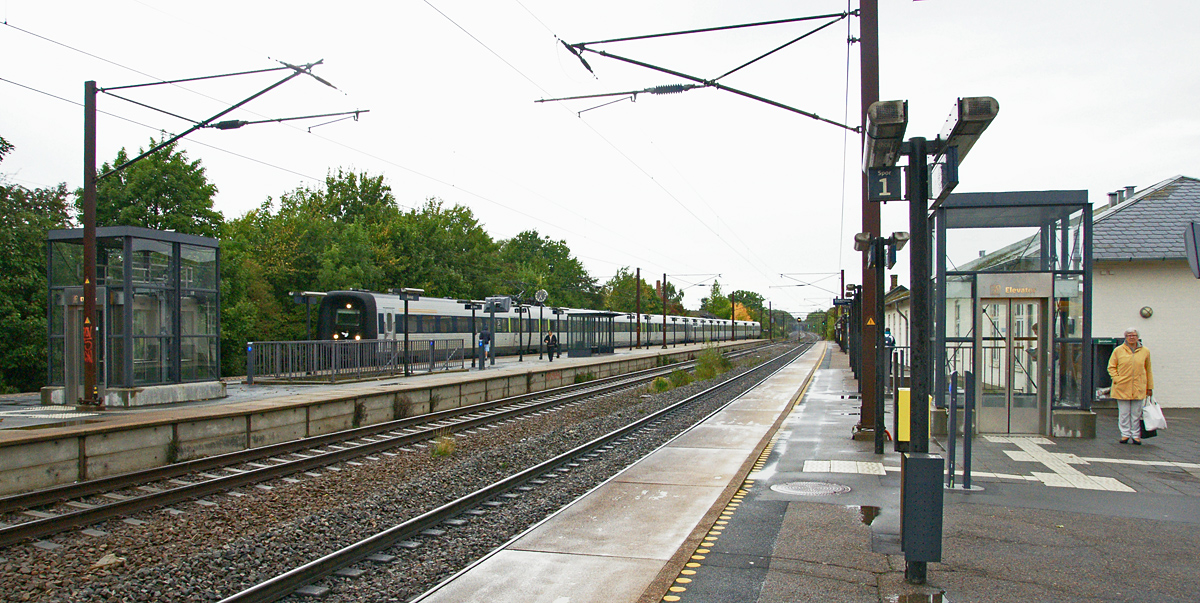
Borup railway station

Borup is served by Borup railway station, located on the Copenhagen–Fredericia railway line.

== Notable people ==
- Frede Christoffersen (1919 in Borup – 1987) a Danish painter and illustrator
- Jakob Glerup (born 1975 in Borup) a former Danish football midfielder, played 454 games for Viborg FF
