= Steen Beck =

Danish landholder and royal treasurer

Steen Beck (8 December 1603 – 30 September 1648) was a Danish landholder and government official. He served as royal treasurer from 1628 until his death. His holdings included the estates of Førslevgaard and Vibygård on the Danish island of Zealand.

== Early life and education ==
Steen Beck was born into an influential noble family in Copenhagen to Sivert Beck (1566–1623) and Lisbet Bille (1576–1656). Beck's father served as royal treasurer from 1596. His grandfather Lauge Beck and great-grandfather had previously also held this post.

Steen Beck was educated abroad. His grand tour took him to Strasbourg (1622), Padua (1626) and Rome (1625–26).

== Career ==
In 1627, Beck was appointed as hofjunker or court valet. In 1628, following in the footsteps of his father, grandfather and great-grandfather, he was appointed as royal treasurer. In 1648, he obtained a high number of votes at the nobility's election for the Privy Council but died prior to the king's appointment of the new privy councillors in November.

== Property ==
Beck inherited Førslevgaard, Vibygård and Tågerød on the Danish island of Zealand and Vandås in Scania.

In 1628, in conjunction with his appointment as royal treasurer, he was granted a prepositure and a prebendary under Lund Cathedral. He was fiefholder of Bakke kloster in Norway (1633–41) and fiefholder of Herrevad Kloster in Scania (1641–48).

== Personal life ==
From 29 March 1634, Beck was married to Ide Lindenov (died 1674), daughter of privy councillor Hans Johansen Lindenow til Gavnø (1573–1642) and Lisbeth Sophie Breidesdatter Rantzau til Hindema and Nislevgård (1587–1652).
