= Beldringe =

Manor house bear Præstø, Denmark

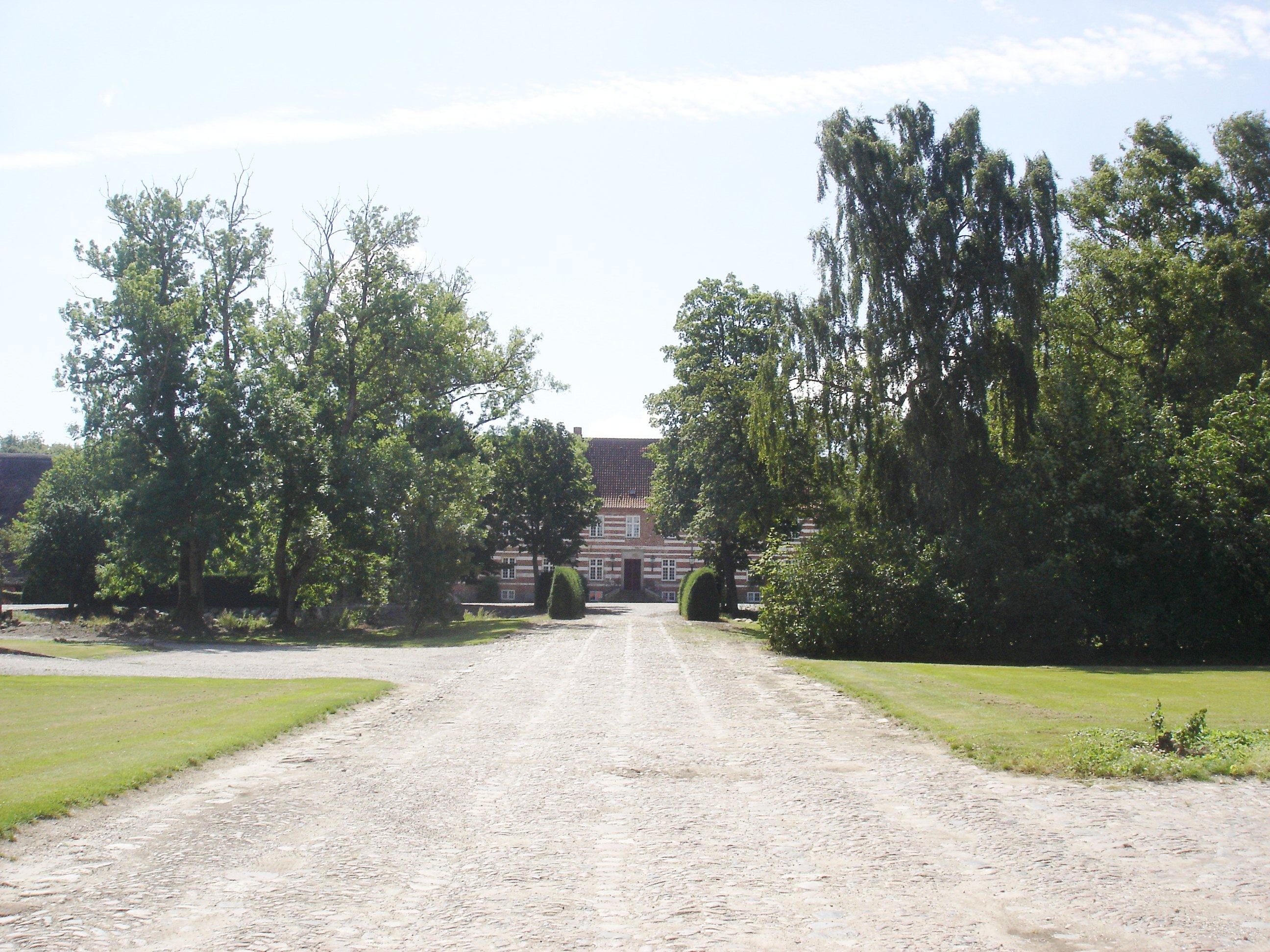
- Beldringe Manor house
- Interactive map of the Beldringe area

General information
- Location: Hastrupvej 3C; 4720 Præstø, Denmark
- Coordinates: 55°6′24″N 11°59′28″E
- Completed: 1561 (main building); 1715 (barn)

Beldringe is a manor house and estate located four kilometres southwest of Præstø, Vordingborg Municipality, Denmark. The estate was from 1774 to 1993 owned by members of the Raben/Raben-Levetzau family. The two-storey main building from 1561 and a large, half-timbered barn from the 1710s were listed on the Danish registry of protected buildings and places in 1918.

== History ==
=== Early history ===
The first known owner of Beldringe was Joseph Nielsen Blade. He is mentioned as the owner in 1360. On his death, Beldringe seems to have passed to his son Anders Jensen Basse. He left the estate to his niece Dorthe Christoffersdatter Basse. She was married to Jacob Jensen Ravensberg til Kindholm.

=== Beck family ===
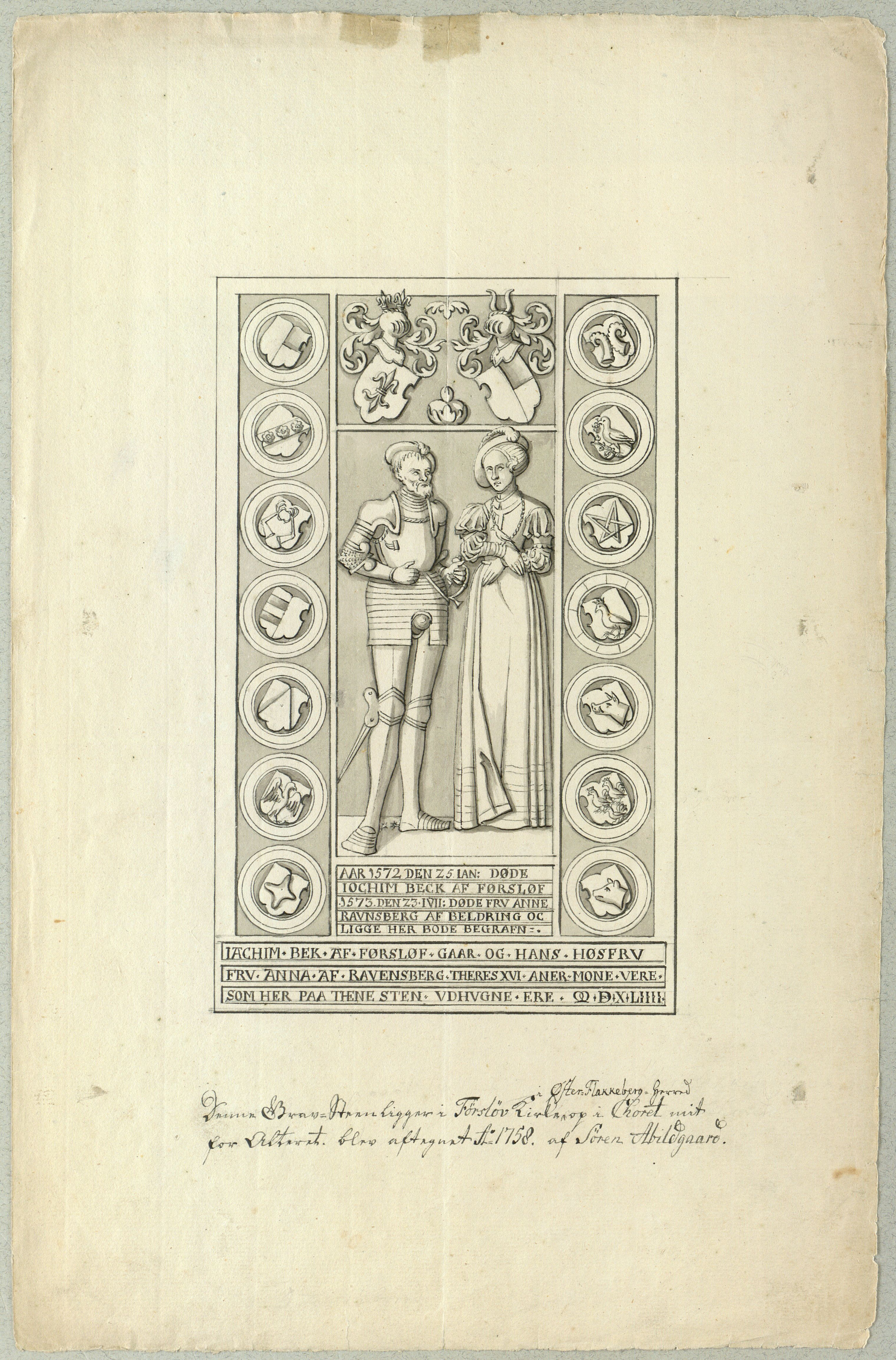
Drawing of the relief of Joachim Beck and his wife on his grave in Førslev Church

On Jacob Jensen Ravensber's death, Beldringe passed to his daughter Datteren Anne Jaocbsdatter Ravensberg. In 1522, she married Joachim Beck (c. 1500–72), who already owned nearby Førslevgaard. In 1537, Beck was appointed as royal treasurer (rentemester) of Eastern Denmark. In addition to his prestigious new office, Beck was granted considerable holdings of land on Zealand.

Joachim Beck and Anna Ravnsberg are buried at Førslev Church. On Beck's death in 1573, Beldringe and Førslevgaard passed to their son Lauge Beck (c. 1530–1607). He succeeded his father in the office as royal treasurer. On his own death in 1607, Beldringe passed to his son Jacob Beck while Førslevgaard went to his other son Sivert Beck (1566–1623).

=== 1521–1774: Royal ownership ===
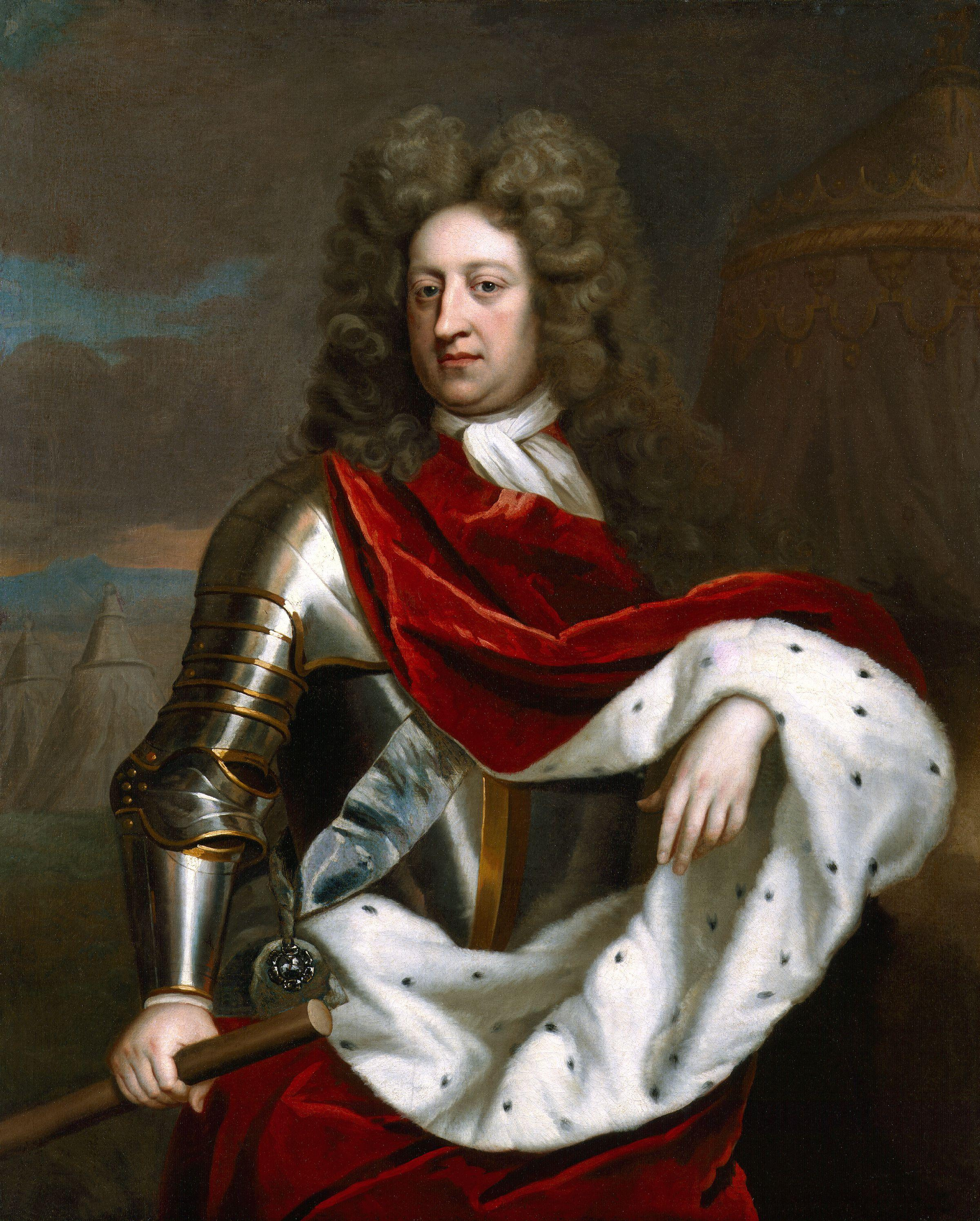
Prince George

In 1621, Jacob Beck ceded Beldringe to Christian IV in exchange for Gladsaxe in Scania. Christian IV used the land as hunting grounds.. At this point, Beldringe consisted of the manor and a total of 52 tenant farms. In 1622, Beldringe Manor was again expanded. The main building was also renovated.

In his will of 1665, Frederick III bequeathed Vordingborg Castle and the manors of Beldringe and Lekkende to his youngest son, Prince George. After Prince George's death in 1708, all his holdings reverted to the Crown. The estate was subsequently included in the new Vordingborg Cavalry Fistrict.

=== 1774–1993: The Raben-Levetzau family ===
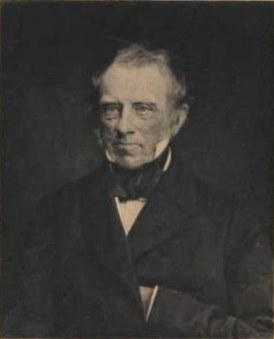
Carl Vilhelm Raben-Levetzau

In 1769, it was decided to sell Vordingborg Cavalry District. In 1774, it was divided into 12 estates and sold at public auction. The auction took place at Vordingvorg Castle on 27 September. Beldringe and Lekkende were both sold to Frederik Sophus Raben (1745–1820). He undertook a comprehensive refurbishment of the main building. On his death, Beldringe passed to his son Carl Vilhelm Raben (1789–1870). He had served as a diplomat in the Hague for many years but returned to Denmark to manage his estate. In 1834, he was granted royal permission to assume the surname Raben-Levetzau. Lekkende was passed to a younger brother.

Having no children, Carl Vilhelm Raben-Levetzau and his wife Julia Adelaide Harriet Bornemann established Den Raben-Levetsauske Fond. After Julia Adelaide Harriet Bornemann's death in 1888, Beldringe passed to the nephew Frederik Christoffer Otto Raben-Levetzau (1850–1933). Om 17905, he was appointed Minister of Foreign Affairs.

Frederik Christoffer Otto Raben-Levetzaus was succeeded on the estate by his son Johan Otto Raben-Levetzau. On his death in 1922, it was passed to his daughter. In 1993, she sold it to the wealthy Hong Kong-based Jebsen family.

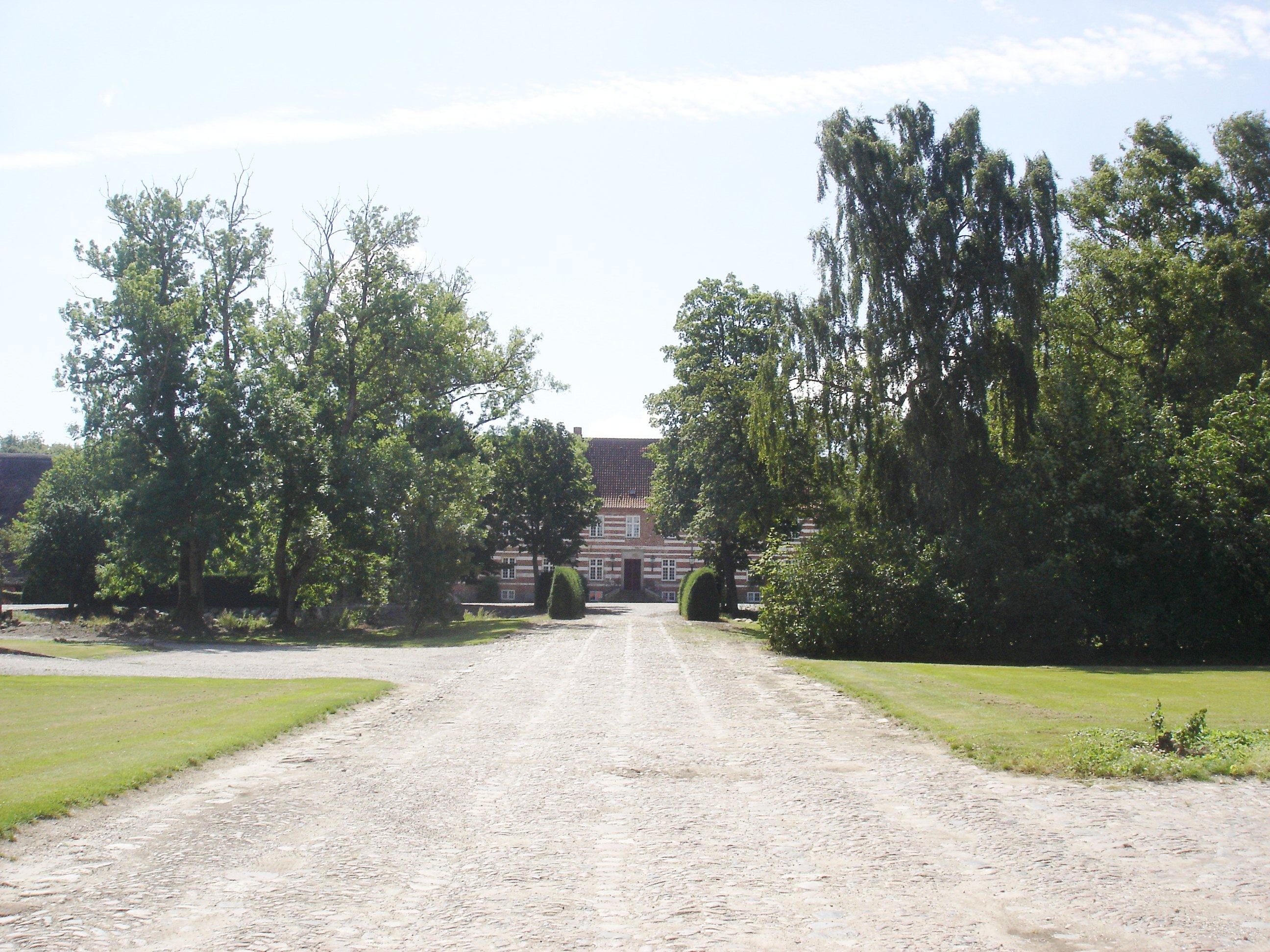
Beldringe's main building, constructed by Joachim Beck ca. 1560

== Architecture ==
The two storey main building is from 1561. It is constructed in red brick with bands of partly white-washed limestone. It stands on a foundation of field stones and has a base of finely cut granite ashlars.

Most of the farm buildings were destroyed in a fire in 1910. The most notable exception is a large, half-timbered barn from 1715. The barn is 30 bays long and 14 bays wide. The main building and the half-timbered barn were listed on the Danish registry of protected buildings and places in 1918. The scope of the heritage listing was expanded in 1990. Most of the other farm buildings date from after the fire. The entrance to the complex is marked by a gatehouse.

== Today ==
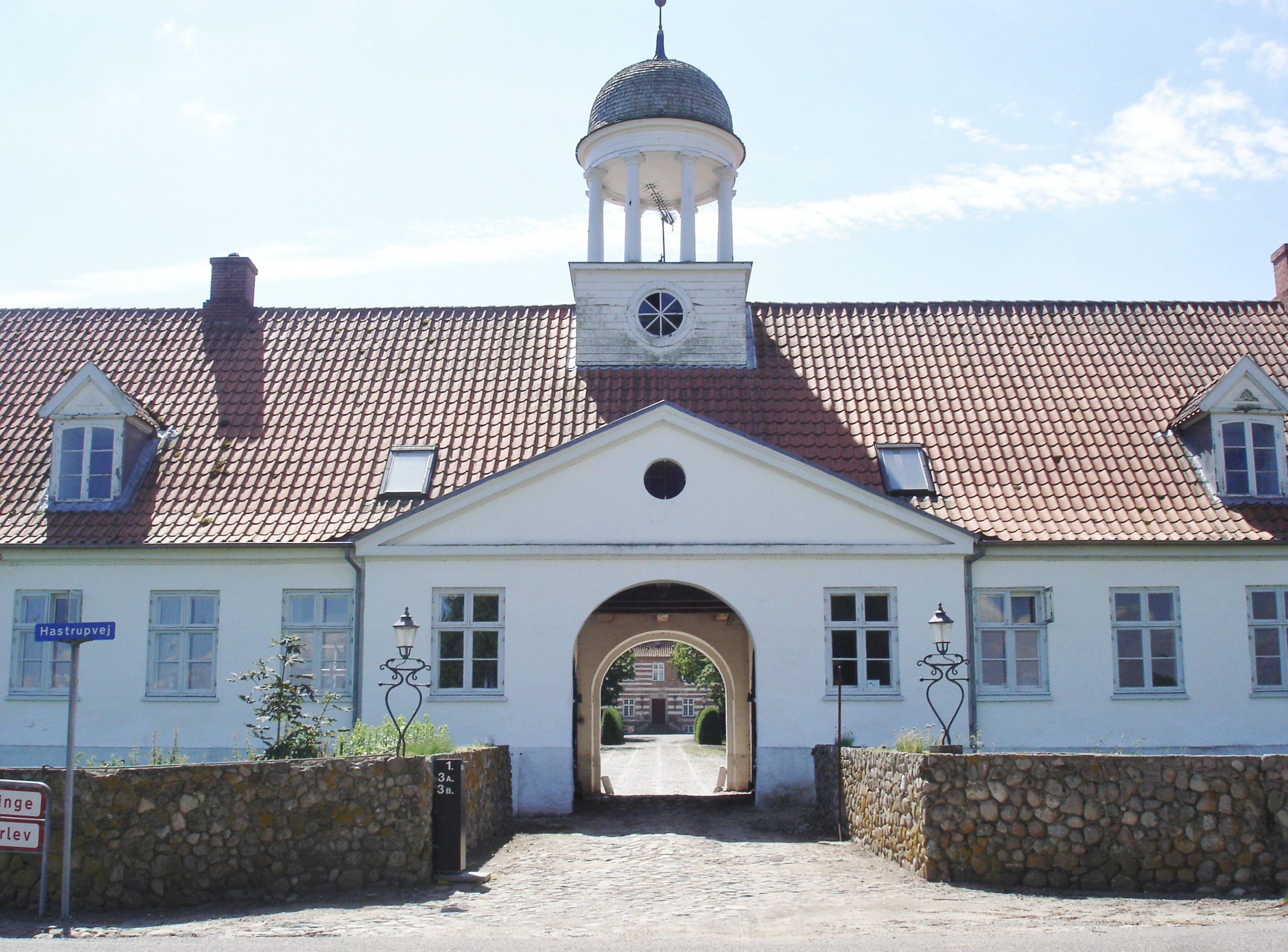
The gatehouse.

As of 2020, Beldringe is owned by Beldringe Gods Ejendomme A/S, which is again owned by Marie Sidonie Jebsen.

The harvest festival scene in the Academy Award-winning 1876 film Pelle the Conqueror was filmed at Beldringe.

== List of owners ==
- (1360) Joseph Nielsen Blad
- (1421) Tage Josephsen Blad
- (1457) Anders Jensen Basse
- (1473) Morten Andersen Basse
- ( -1512) Jakob Jepsen
- (1512–1522) Anne Jacobsdatter Ravensberg, gift Beck
- (1522–1572) Joachim Beck
- (1572- ) Albert Joachimsen Beck
- ( -1607) Lauge Beck
- (1607–1621) Jacob Lavesen Beck
- (1621–1670) The Crown
- (1670–1708) Prince George of Denmark
- (1708–1774) Kronen
- (1774–1820) Frederik Sophus Raben
- (1820–1870) Carl Vilhelm Raben-Levetzau
- (1870–1888) Julia Adelaide Harriet Bornemann, gift Raben-* Levetzau*
- (1888–19* 31) Frederik Christopher Otto Raben-Levetzau
- (1931–1992) Johan Otte Raben-Levetzau
- (1992–1993) Nina Veronika Raben-Levetzau
- (1993- ) Beldringe Gods ApS

== Related reading ==
- Stilling, Niels Peter (2014) Danmarks Herregårde. Sjælland, Møn og Lolland-Falster
- Source

(Gyldendal) ISBN 9788702132441
