= Rentekammeret =

Danish central administrative body

The Rentekammeret (English: The Treasury) was the Danish central administrative body responsible for overseeing the public finances from the middle of the 15th century until 1849. The chief officials of Rentekammeret held the title of Rentemester (Treasurer).

== History ==
The Rentekammer, is first mentioned in the 1550s, although a rentemester is mentioned as early as 1517. At the introduction of the absolute monarchy in 1660 it became a kollegium under the name Skatkammerkollegiet, but in 1679 it was given its old name back.

In 1770 it was merged with the General Customs Chamber (Generaltoldkammeret) and in 1771 became part of the Finanskollegiet, but was revived in 1773 as an independent body under its old name. Originally, the Rentekammeret was solely in charge of the state's payments and disbursements as well as accounting audits, but eventually also became responsible for the overall financial and tax policy as well as for agricultural matters, forestry, roads etc. Over the years, however, changes were made on several occasions in the division of responsibilities between the Rentekammeret and other central administrative bodies. In the ministerial reform of 1848, its affairs were divided between the Ministry of Finance and the Ministry of Interior Affairs.

== Management ==
=== Presidents ===
- (1692–170: Christian Siegfried von Plessen

=== Rentemester ===
People with title of Rentemester:

Years	Rentemester	Notes
-1495	Anders Skrivere	Executed for embezzlement
1517-1520	Anders Olufsen Glob	Provost in Odense
1520-1546	Henrik Schulte	Gormally only Rentemester in Schlesvig-Holstein but de facto served as Rentemester for the entire country.
1525-1536	Christiern Hvid	Dean in Copenhagen
1536-1554	Jørgen Pedersen	Only Rentemester in Nørrejylland
1537-1547	Joachim Beck til Førslevgaard	
1546-1557	Eskil Oxes til Løgismose	
1549-1552	Hermann Skeel til Jungetgård	
1557-1560	Joachim Beck til Førslevgård	
1560-70	Eiler Grubbe til Lystrup	
1567-1575	Lauge Beck til Førslevgård	
1569-1574	Otto Brockenhuus til Vollerslev	
1574-1601	Christoffer Valkendorff til Glorup	
1582-1608	Enevold Kruse	
1585-1596	Holger Gagge til Frøslev	
1590-1597	Anders Nielsen Dresselberg til Vognstrup	
1596-1622	Sivert Beck til Førslevgård	
1609-1617	Jens Juel til Kjeldgård	
1617-1627	Christoffer Urne til Årsmarke and Nielstrup	
1623-1627	Axel Arenfeldt til Basnæs	
1626-1527	Ove Høg til Todbøl	
1627-1543	Jørgen Vind til Gundestrup (Vrams Gunnarstorp)	
1628-1648	Steen Beck til Førslevgård	
1640-1648	Melkior Oldeland til Uggerslevgård	
1648-1651	Oluf Daa til Ravnstrup	
648-53	Jørgen Rosenkrantz til Kjeldgård	
1648-58	Peder Michelsen Wibe	
1653-1560	Peter Reedtz til Tygestrup	
1656-1679	Steen Hohendorff til Rønneholm	
1657-1660	Mogens Frijs til Vadskærgård	Member of the skatkammerkollegiet until 1672
1660-1664	Christoffer Gabel til Bavelse	
1660-1679	Henrick Müller til Dragsholm	
1679-1681	Heinrich von Støcken til Pederstrup	

== See also ==
- Marshal of the Realm (Denmark)
- Steward of the Realm (Denmark)
