= Vibygård =

Manor house in Roskilde Municipality, Denmark

Coordinates: 55.5626°N 12.0214°E

Vibygård is a manor house located in the northeastern outskirts of Viby, Roskilde Municipality, some 30 km west of Copenhagen, Denmark. The estate covers 833 hectares of land and comprises the farms Slåenkær, Ørstedgård, Arnakke and Drags-Møllegård.

== History ==
=== Sparre family ===
Vibygård traces its history back to at least the first half of the 14th century, when it was owned by Morten Truelsen Sparre. The estate remained in the hands of the Sparre family for the next 200 years.

=== 17th century ===
In 1620, Vibygaard was acquired by Sivert Beck. It was later owned by his son and daughter-in-law. In 1650 it was acquired by Ove Gjedde, who had recently resigned from the post of Admiral of the Realm after falling ill, and instead had been granted the fiefdom of Helsingborg Castle in 1648.

In 1682, it became possible for members of the bourgeoisie to own manors which had belonged to the nobility. In the same year, Vibygård was purchased by Professor Christian Nold, who had recently resigned from the post of rector of the University of Copenhagen after falling out of favour with Peder Griffenfeld. In 1682, he married Marie Elligers, the wealthy widow of court jeweller Paul Kurtz.

=== 18th centurycentury ===
King Frederick IV acquired the estate in 1709. In 1719, he ceded it to Peder Benzon in exchange for Tryggevælde and Alslevgaard. Benzon was a major landowner on Zealand. He undertook comprehensive alterations, transforming the house into a two-winged complex, partly with timber framing.

After Benzons's death, Vibygaard was sold to another major landowner, Thomas Johan de Neergaard. His widow married to J. C. von Westen. In 1757, he sold the estate to Adam Christoffer Holsten.

=== 19th century ===
In 1852, the estate was purchased by Josias Daniel Hansen Schmidt, a silk and textile merchant. In 1857, he replaced the old main building with the current one in Italian style.

== Owners ==
- (14th century) Slægten Sparre
- (1397–1429) Peder Mortensen Sparre
- (1429–1471) Jens Thorbernsen Sparre
- (1471–1472) Jep Jensen Sparre
- (1490–1511) Thorbern Jepsen Sparre
- (1511–1557) Jep Thorbernsen Sparre
- (1577-????) Emmike Jepsen Sparre
- (????-1613) Emmike Emmikesen Sparre
- (1613–1620) Claus Emmikesen Sparre
- (1620–1623) Sivert Beck
- (1623–1648) Steen Sivertsen Beck
- (1648–1650) Ide Lindenov, née Beck
- (1650–1655) Ove Gjedde
- (1655–1666) Otte Krag
- (1666–1667) Sofie Amalie Krag, married 1) Ulfeldt, 2) Rantzau
- (1667–1670) Christoffer Ulfeldt
- (1670-16??) Sofie Amalie Krag, married 1) Ulfeldt, 2) Rantzau
- (16??-1681) Otto Rantzau
- (1681–1683) Christian Nold
- (1683–1695) Marie Elliger, married 1) Kurtz, 2) Nold
- (1695–1704) Christian Nold
- (1704–1707) Ditlev Reusch
- (1707–1709) Hans Bøtke
- (1709) Anna Maria von Ehrenschild, married Bøtke
- (1709–1719) The Crown
- (1719–1735) Peder Benzon
- (1735–1737) Boet efter Peder Benzon
- (1737–1742) Thomas Johan de Neergaard
- (1742-17??) Barbara Holgersdatter Olivarius, married 1) de Neergaard, 2) von Westen
- (17??-1757) J. C. von Westen
- (1757–1758) Adam Christoffer Holsten
- (1758–1775) Peter Mikkelsen Qvistgaard
- (1775–1805) Jørgen Pedersen Qvistgaard
- (1805–1827) Peder Qvistgaard
- (1827–1846) Claus Henrik Munk Sandholt
- (1846–1852) Jacob Jacobsen
- (1852–1872) Josias Daniel Hansen Schmidt
- (1872–1883) Josias Daniel Christian Schmidt
- (1883–1915) Ernst Voss
- (1915–1929) Marie Voss
- (1929–1931) Vilhelm Pedersen
- (1931–1970) J. B. Berthelsen
- (2006- ) Iver Hecht
- (2006- ) Aase Glad
