= Frederik Raben-Levetzau =

Danish noble and politician (1850–1933)

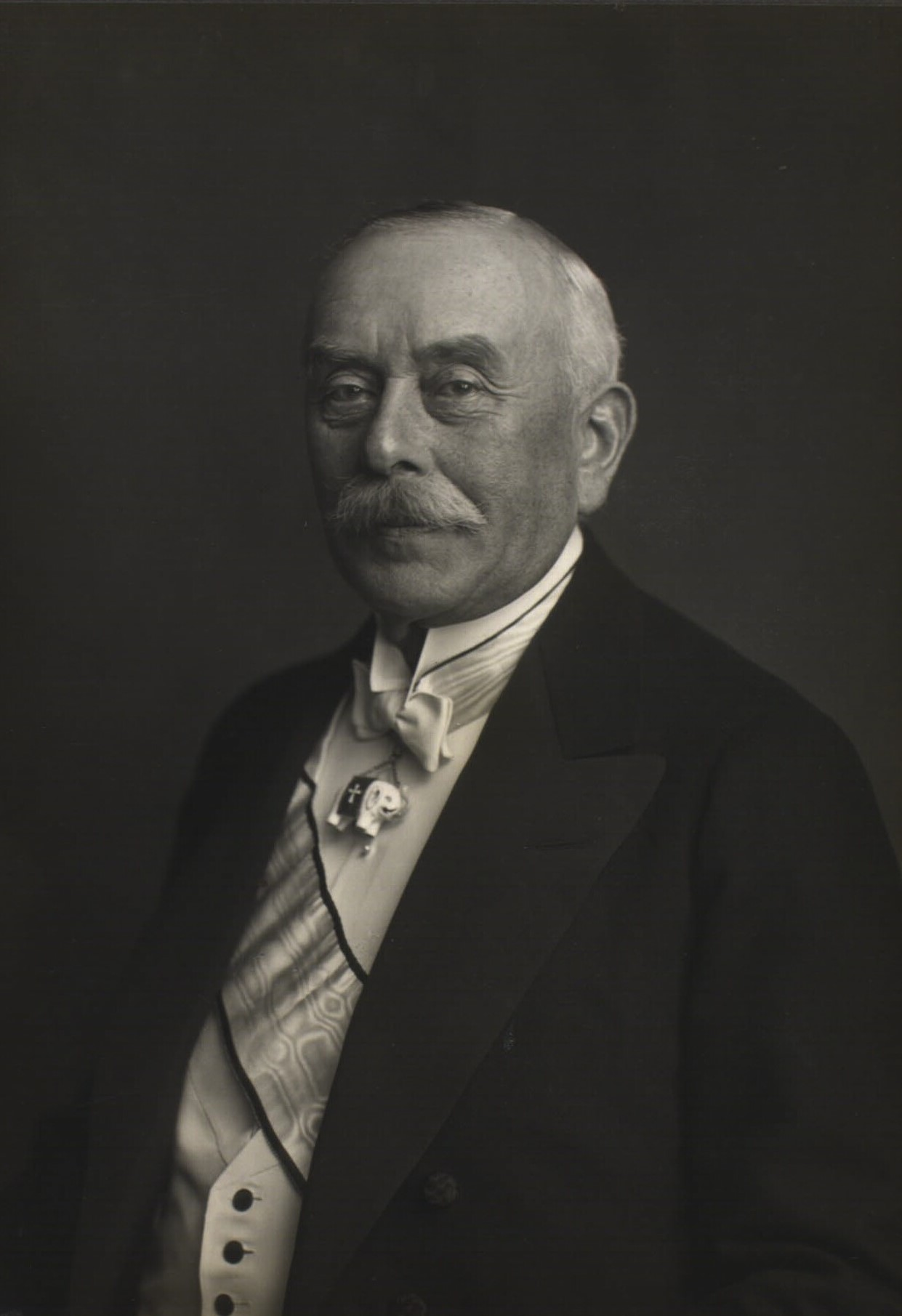

Minister of Foreign Affairs
- In office 1905–1908
- Monarch: Christian IX
- Prime Minister: Jens Christian Christensen

Personal details
- Born: Frederik Christopher Otto Raben-Levetzau; 27 May 1850 Lekkende
- Died: 5 May 1933 (aged 82) Ålholm
- Party: Venstre
- Spouse: Lillie Suzanne Moulton

Frederik Raben-Levetzau, Count of Christiansholm (27 May 1850 – 5 May 1933) was a Danish noble and politician who was the minister of foreign affairs between 1905 and 1908. He was one of Denmark's largest landowners. The Countship of Christiansholm comprised the estates Ålholm, Bramsløkke, Egholm and Stenvængegården. His other holdings included Bremersvold, Beldringe and Lekkende on Southern Zealand.

== Early life and education ==
Raben-Levetzau was born in Lekkende on 27 May 1850. His parents were Count Josias Raben-Levetzau (1796-1889) and Siegfriede Victorine Krogh (1823-98).

== Career ==
In 1877 he joined the ministry of foreign affairs and worked as an attaché in Paris between 1877 and 1878 and in Vienna between 1879 and 1881. On his father's death in 1889 he took over the county of Christiansholm in Lolland.

Raben-Levetzau was appointed minister of foreign affairs in 1905. He was a supporter of the German Empire and improved the relations between Denmark and the Empire which was finalized through the signing of the Optant Convention in 1907. Raben-Levetzau held the post until 1908 when he resigned from the office. Following his resignation the cabinet also collapsed, and Raben-Levetzau retired from politics.

== Personal life ==
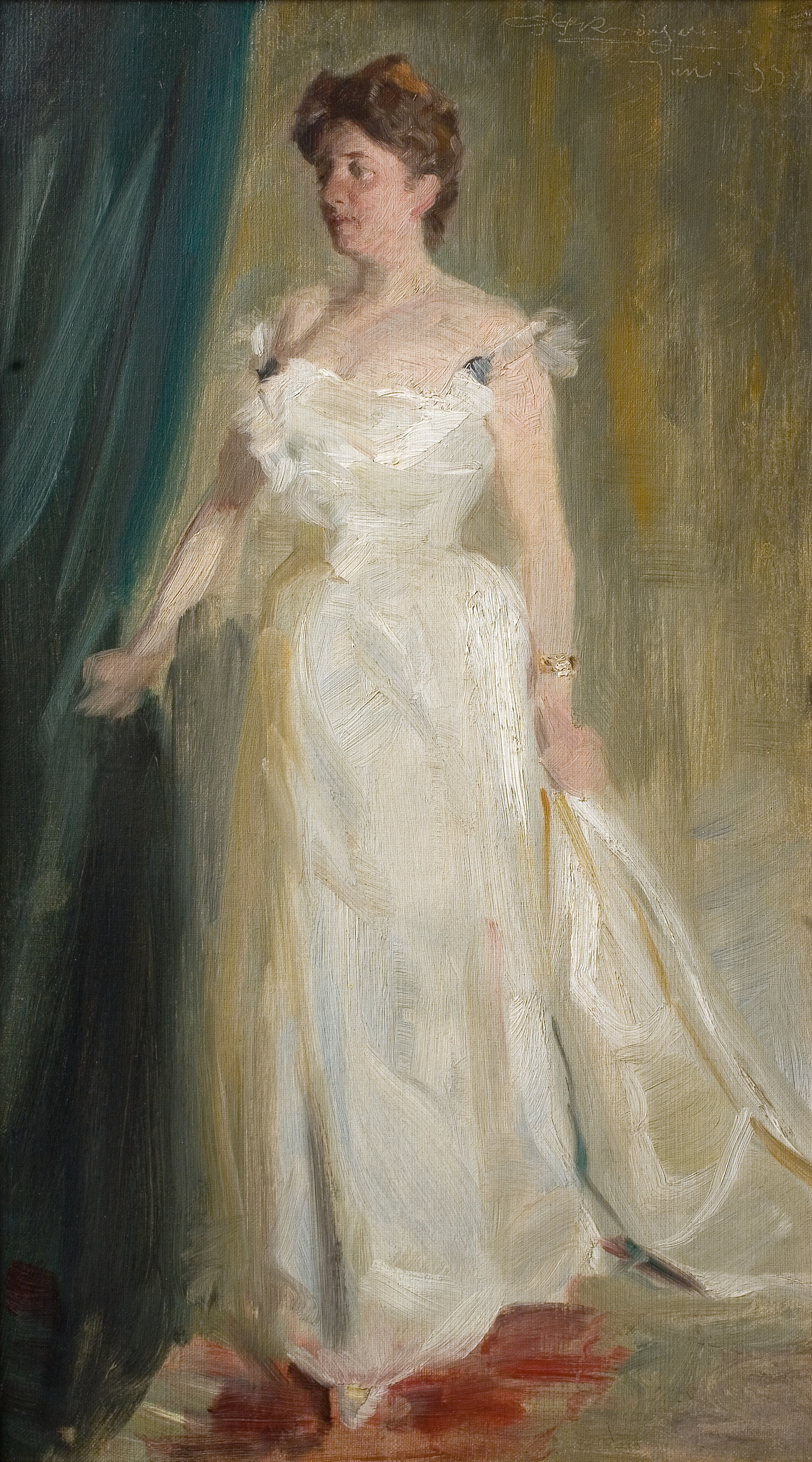
Lillie Suzanne Raben-Levetzau painted by Peder Severin Krøyer.National Gallery of Denmark.

Raben-Levetzau married Lillie Suzanne Moulton, an American woman, in Rome on 8 April 1886. He died in Ålholm on 5 May 1933. They had four children:

- Lillie Suzanne Frederikke Emerentia Raben-Levetzau (1887-), married the American diplomat Lithgow Osborne
- Suzanne Marie Signe Raben-Levetzau (1888-1953), married Emil Victor Schau Lassen
- Siegfred Victor Raben-Levetzau (1891-1965), married to Pauline Wilhelmine Anastasia Kathinka Susan Reginsinde von Pappenheim. He was director of Seton Trust Ltd., Glyn Partncss, Electric & General Investments Trust and Scandinavian Shipping Gazette, Nautisk Forlag. He was appointed Hofjægermester in 1938.
- Johan Otto Valdemar Raben-Levetzau (1904-1992), married to Agnete Dommerby . He succeeded his father to Aalholm.

== Ancestry ==
Ancestors of Frederik Raben-Levetzau

16. Johan Otto Raben
8. Christian Frederik Raben
17. Emerentia von Levetzow
4. Frederik Sophus von Raben-Levetzau
18. Christian Ludvig von Plessen
9. Berte Scheel von Plessen
19. Charlotte Amalie Skeel
2. Josias Raben-Levetzau
20. Henrik von Qualen
10. Josias von Qualen
21. Magdalene von Buchwaldt aus Pronstorf
5. Sophie Magdalene von Qualen
22. Wulf von Blome
11. Elisabeth von Blome
23. Wulf von Blome
1. Frederik Raben-Levetzau
24. Georg Frederich von Krogh
12. Friedrich Ferdinand von Krogh
25. Hedevig Augusta von Brüggemann
6. Gerhard Christopher von Krogh
26. Hans Ernst von Frankenberg und Proschlitz
13. Rosina Elisabeth von Krogh
27. Elisabeth Sophia von Raben
3. Siegfriede Victorine Raben-Levetzau
28. Christian Frederik Knuth
14. Adam Christopher Knuth
29. Anne Christine von der Osten
7. Siegfriede Victorine von Krogh
30. Adam Gottlob Moltke
15. Sophia Magdalena Moltke
31. Sophie Hedevig Raben
