= Arenfeldt =

Arenfeldt is a Danish surname. Notable people with the surname include:

- Allan Arenfeldt Olesen (born 1982), Danish footballer
- Axel Arenfeldt (1590–1647), Danish landowner
