= Laurence de Boysset =

Danish landowner

- Born: c. 1633; France
- Died: February 3, 1728 (aged 95); Basnæs, Denmark
- Military career
- Allegiance: Denmark
- Branch: Danish Army
- Service years: 1683–1720
- Rank: Lieutenant General
- Unit: Royal Life Guards
- Conflicts: War of the Spanish Succession; Great Northern War
- Awards: White Knight (1717)
- Other work: Landowner, Board member of Danish West India Company

Laurence de Boysset (c. 1633 – 3 February 1728) was a French-born Danish military officer and landowner.

== Early life and military career ==
Born in France around 1633, Boysset came to Denmark during the reign of Christian V and began his career in Danish service in August 1683 as captain reforme in the Royal Life Guards. He was promoted to major in 1685, lieutenant colonel in 1690, and colonel in 1697. During the brief fighting in Zealand in 1700, on 22 July, he fended off an attempt to land enemy troops at Gyldenlund. Later that same year, Boysset was part of an auxiliary corps that was sent to Saxony and later served on the Imperial side in the Italian theatre of the War of the Spanish Succession. In 1702, he participated in battles near Mantua. Boysset returned to Denmark in 1703.

In 1706–1713, Boysset was in British-Dutch service in the Brabant, first with rank of brigadier and from 1709 as major-general. He then brought part of his military corps back to Denmark. Boysset participated in the Danish army's battles in Northern Germany during the Great Northern War, most notably the Siege of Stralsund and the conquest of Rügen, and was promoted to lieutenant general in 1715. He was made a White Knight in 1717. On 26 August 1720, Boysset was dismissed with honour but with a very modest pension.

== Other activities ==
Boysset purchased Basnæs in 1714 or 1716 and kept it until his death. He was a member of the board of directors of Danish West India Company. A prolonged legal dispute between Boysset and the widow of general Christian Frederik Bielke ended in 1720 when Boysset was sentenced to pay more than 20,000 gylden to the king for equipment from the Italian corps.

== Personal life and death ==
Boysset married Margrethe Elisabeth Stuart (c. 1653 – 31 July 1723) on 6 January 1691. He died on 3 February 1728 at Basnæs and is buried at Tjæreby Church.
