= Lekkende =

Manor house near Præstø, Denmark

- Interactive map of the Lekkende area

General information
- Location: Lekkendevej 25; 4735 Mern, Denmark
- Coordinates: 55°3′56.65″N 12°0′46.19″E
- Completed: 1838

Lekkende is a manor house and estate located 8 km south of Præstø, Vordingborg Municipality, Denmark. The estate was from 1774 to 1993 owned by members of the Raben/Raben-Levetzau family, The main building is from 1838 but was heightened by one storey in 1880.

== History ==
=== Church and crown land ===
In the Middle Ages, Lekkende belonged to the Bishops of Roskilde. In Roskildebispens Jordebog, Ydby Church is mentioned as belonging to the estate.

During the Reformation, in 1536, Lekkende and all other church land was confiscated by the Crown and alternately placed under the fiefs of Vordingborg and Saltø. The lensmandEjler Grubbe constructed a number of new buildings in 1585. In 1660, Frederick II granted Lekkende and Beldringe to his youngest son, Prince George, for life. After his death in 1708. Lekkende and Beldringe reverted to the Crown along with the rest of Vordingborg County. In 1719, Lekkende was included in the new Vordingborg Cavalry District.

=== Raben-Levetzau family ===
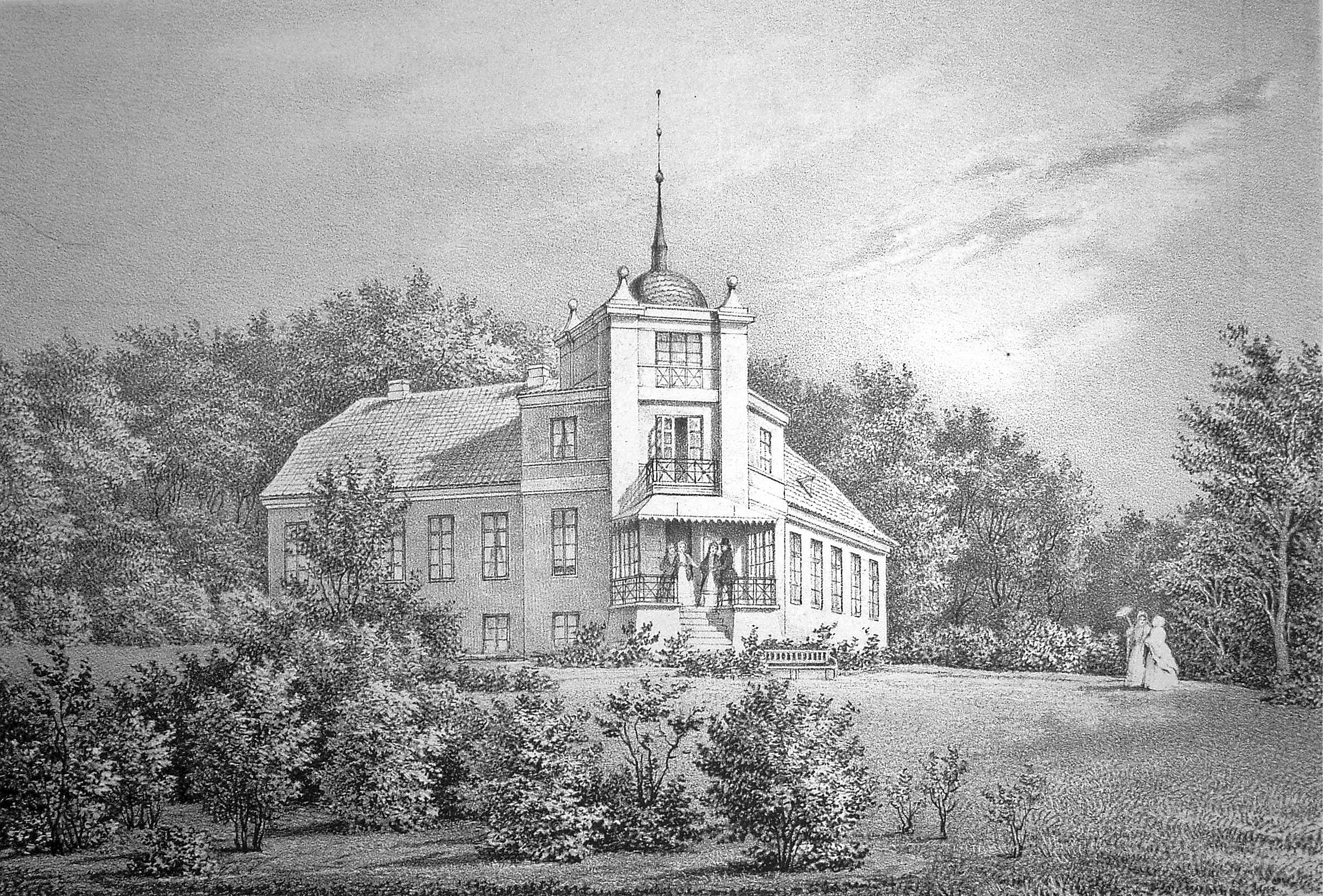
The new main building in 1838

In 1769, it was decided to sell Vordingborg Cavalry District. In 1774, it was into 12 estates and sold in public auction. The auction took place at Vordingvorg Castle on 27 September. Lekkende and Beldringe were both acquired by Frederik Sophus von Raben (1645-1820). On his death, Lekkende passed to his youngest son, Josias Raben (1796-1889). Beldringe was passed to his elder brother Carl Wilhelm Raben. In 1834, they were granted royal permission to assume the surname Raben-Levetzau.

In 1838, Josias Raben-Levetzau e constructed a new main building. He was married to Siegfriede von Krogh. In 1899, she ceded the estate to their son Frederik Raben-Levetzau. He was active in politics and served as Minister of Foreign Affairs in the Cabinet of J.C. Christensen from 1905 to 1908.

In 1931, Frederik Raben-Levetzau ceded Lekkende to his son Johan Otto Raben-Levetzau.

=== Later history ===
In 2005, Lekkende was acquired by Stig Husted-Andersen via the company Skrumle Landbrug ApS. Husted-Andersen died in 2008. In 2012-13, his three daughters unsuccessfully attempted to sell Lekkende for DKK 1900 million. One of the daughters, Dichte Husted-Andersen, has lived in the main building.

== Architecture ==
The main building from 1838 consisted of two single-story wings which met in three-story "tower" overlooking the garden. The two low wings were heightened to two stories in 1880. The building is yellow with white cornices. The tower is topped by a domed roof surrounded by four pinnacles.

== List of owners ==
- ( -1536) Roskilde bispestol
- (1536-1670) Kronen
- (1670-1708) Prins Jørgen
- (1708-1774) Kronen
- (1774-1820) Frederik Raben
- (1820-1889) Josias Raben-Levetzau
- (1889-1899) Siegfriede Raben-Levetzau née von Krogh
- (1899-1931) Frederik Raben-Levetzau
- (1931-1992) Johan Otto Valdemar Raben-Levetzau
- (1992-1933) Frederik Ivan Josias Raben-Levetzau
- (1993-2005) Andreas Hastrup
- (2005-2008) Stig Husted-Andersen
- (2008- ) Estate of Stig Husted-Andersen
