= Basnæs =

Manor house near Kalundborg, Denmark

- Interactive map of the Basnæs area

General information
- Location: Basnæsvej 150; 4230 Skælskør, Denmark
- Coordinates: 55°12′36.64″N 11°20′42.74″E
- Completed: 1846

Design and construction
- Architect: Gustav Friedrich Hetsch

Basnæs is a manor house and estate located southeast of Skælskør, Slagelse Municipality, Denmark. The Gothic Revival style main building is a three-storey building with three corner towers designed by Gustav Friedrich Hetsch. The estate covers approximately 1,000 hectares of land.

== History ==
=== Origins ===
In the Middle Ages, Basnæs was the name of two small villages. The origins of the manor remains unclear. In 1396, Niels Pedersen af Broderup, a knight, pawned two farms in Basnæs and two farms in Nybække to the squire Ture Knudsen.

=== Lunge and Krafse ===
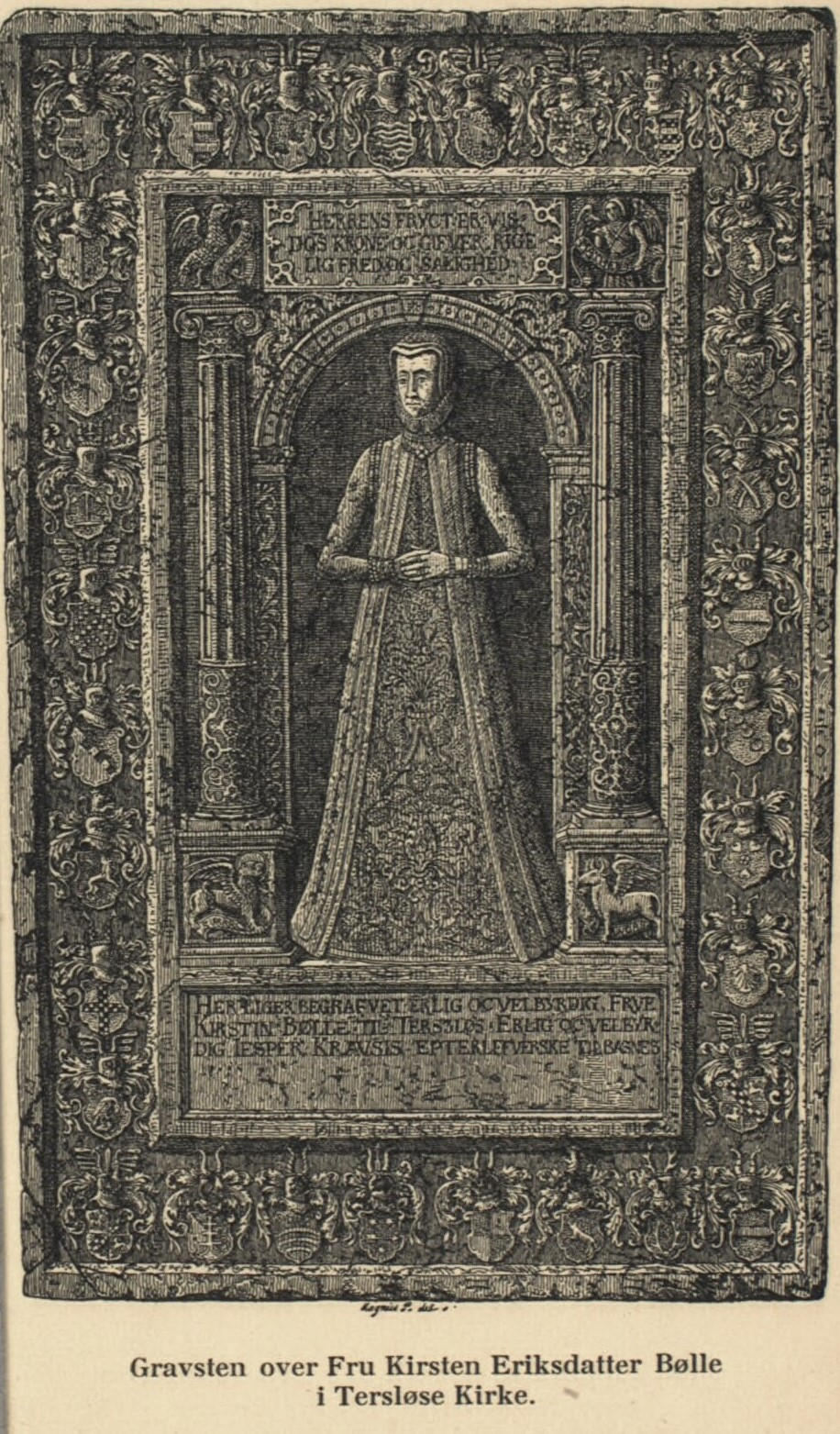
Kirsten Eriksdatter Bølle.

The manor is first mentioned in 1426 when it belonged to Anders Jakobsen Lunge, After his death ownership of the estate passed to his brother Ove Jakobsen Lunge. In 1451, it passed to his son Thhyge Lunge. Though his daughter Karen's marriage Jesper Krafse til Utterslevgård, Basnæs was transferred to members of a new noble family. Their son n Hans Jespersen Krafse, who served as lensmand of Kalundborg and Jorsør, was the next owner of the estate. His son, Jesper Hansen Krafse. who had inherited Basnæs in 1530, drowned at Gptland just six years later. He and his wife Kirstine Bølle had no children. She kept Basnæs but spent most of her time at Terskøsegård, After her death, Nasnæs passed to her brother-in -law Jesper Hansen Krafses bror Eiler Krafse, who also owned Assendrup og Egholm. He was survived by his wife n Hilleborg Bille. After her death, Basnæs was passed to their son-in-law, Otto Brahe, owner of Næsbyholm and Terskøse.

Basnæs passed out of the Brahe family in the 1620s when it was acquired by eren Henrik von der Wisch and shortly thereafter ceded to the Crown.

=== Arenfeldt and Ramel families ===
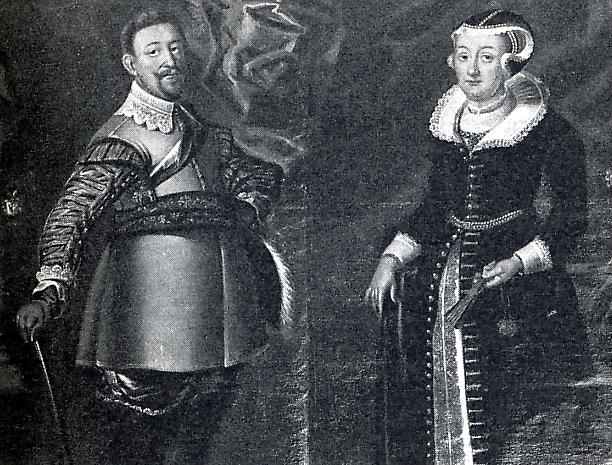
Axel Arenfeldt

Basnæs was in 1726 acquired by general war commissioner r Axel Hansen Arenfeldt, He refurbished the dilapidated main building. He also increased the size of the estate through the acquisition of more land.

After his death in 1647, Basnæs passed to his sons, Jakob Axelsen Arenfeldt til Jensgaard (died 1596) and Jørgen Axelsen Arenfeldt (1717), who both died without issue. Basnæs was therefore passed to their more distant relative Anna Ramel. The next owner was her brother Ove Ramel, who also increased the size of the estate through the acquisition of more land. His widow, Mette )née Rosenkrantz) sold the estate in 1685.

=== Xhanging owners, 1705–1838 ===
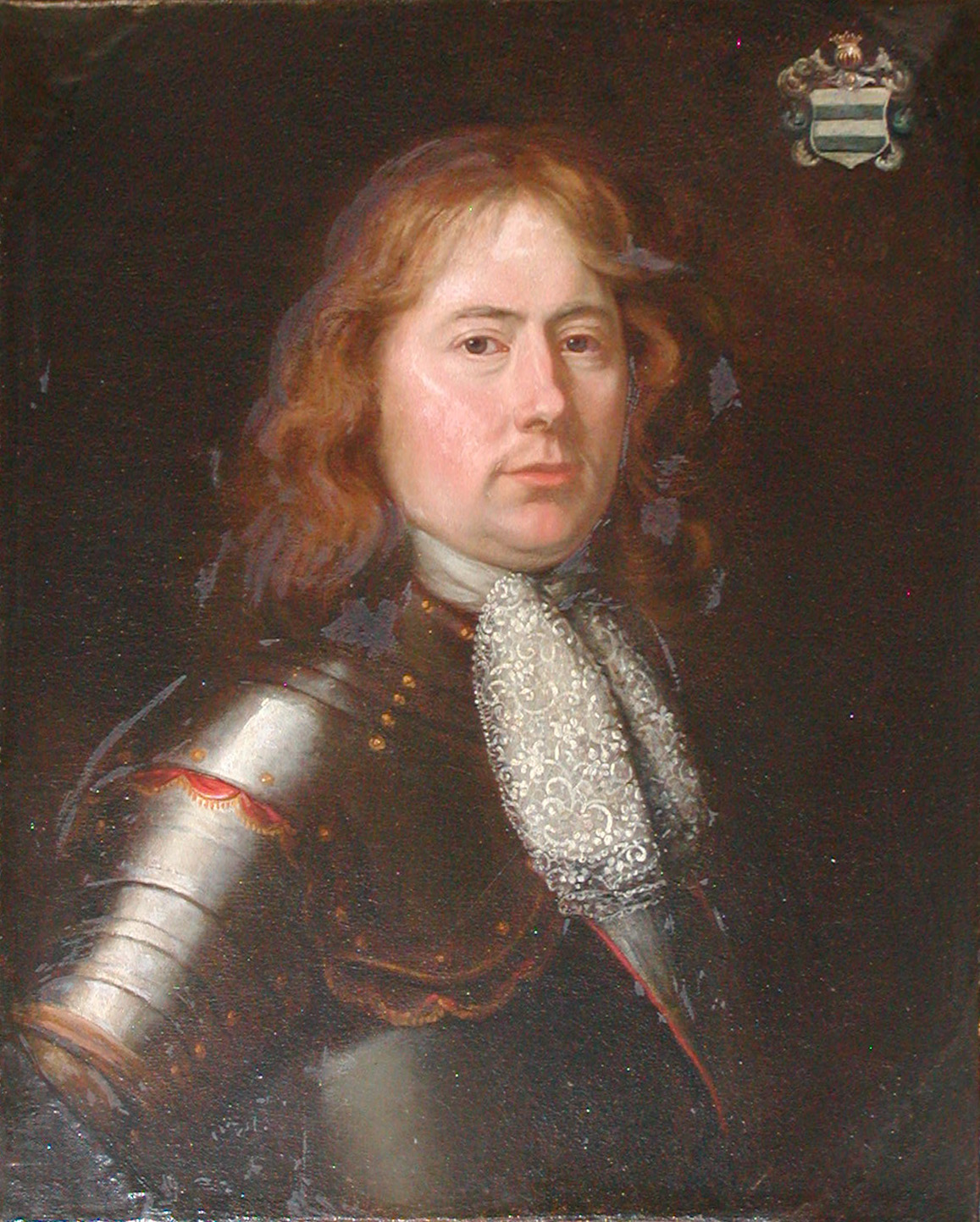
Christian Bielke til Basnæs.

The new owner of Basnæs was admiral Christian Bielke. Bielke increased the size of the estate even further. His third wife, Vibeke Juel, who had become a widow in 1694, married Gregers Juel in 1701. His holdings included Eriksholm and Aastrup. He sold Basnæs in 1705 to Poul Eggersm a district judge of Zealand. Eggers sold Basnæs by auction in 1716 for 40,000 Danish rigsdaler to Lars Venzon til Sæbygård and Hagestedgård. Shortly thereafter Benzon sold the estate to the French-born army officer eralløjtnant Laurence de Boysset. His son Christian Frederik de Boysset sold Basnæs by auction in 1836 for 44,100 rigsdaler to count ktion var greve Frederik von Holstein-Golsteinborg. After his death in 1774, Basnæs was sold in a third auction, this time to Johan Baltzer Henrich, district judge of Lolland-Falster. Henrich sold Basnæs after just one month to Peder Mikkelsen Qvistgaard, who was already leasing Gisselfeld. The next owner was count Frederik Otto von Wedel-Jarlsberg. The main building was destroyed by fire in 1758. The owner was almost killed during the incident. Iver a period of six years, from 1762 to 1768, Basnæs changed hands five times.

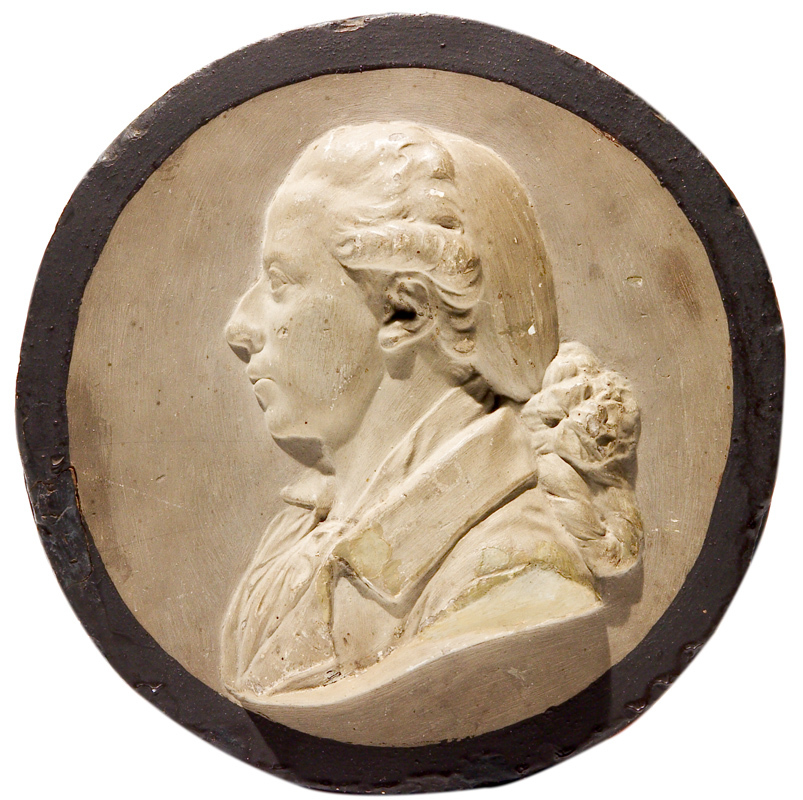
Jens Lowson by Nicolai Dajon, 1786

The next owner was Jens Lowson. In accordance with the wishes of his father, Jacob Lowson, who had just died, Basnæs was subsequently turned into a stam so-called a so-called stamhus (family trust) for members of the Lowson family. The stamhus was already dissolved in 1783 and replaced by a bounded capital of 75,000 rigsdaler. Basnæs was subsequently handed over to Lowson's mother and brother-in-law Christian L. Schütz.

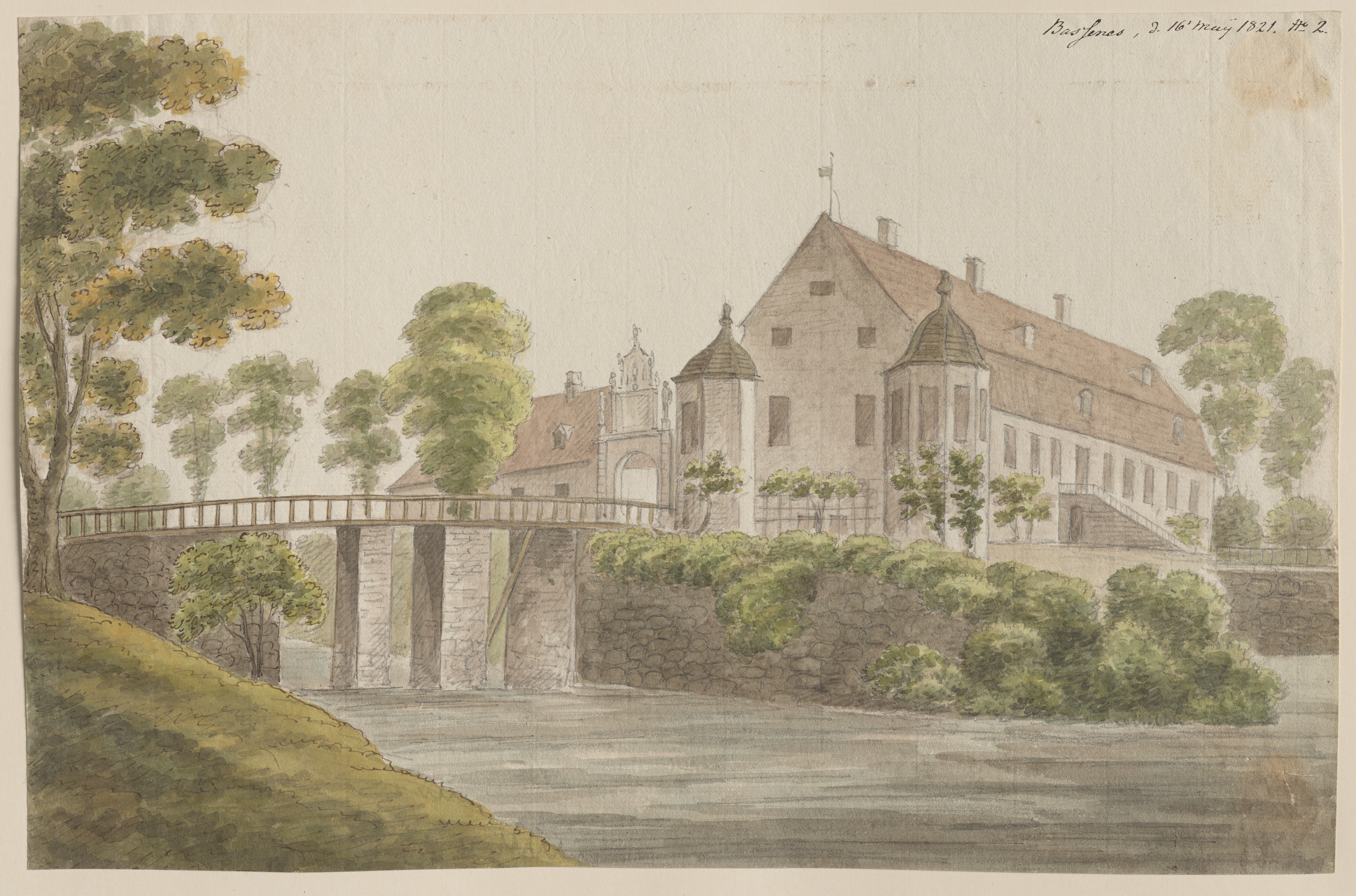
Ole Jørgen Rawert: Basnæs, 16 November 1821.

Basnæs was sold in 1805 for 275,000 rigsdlaer to chamberlain Frederik von Blücher. His widow Helene de Thygeson sold Basnæs in 1809 to sugar manufacturer Christian Frederik Fiedler, whose widow, Juliane Marie Sporon, stayed on the estate until her own death in 1838.

=== Scavenius family ===
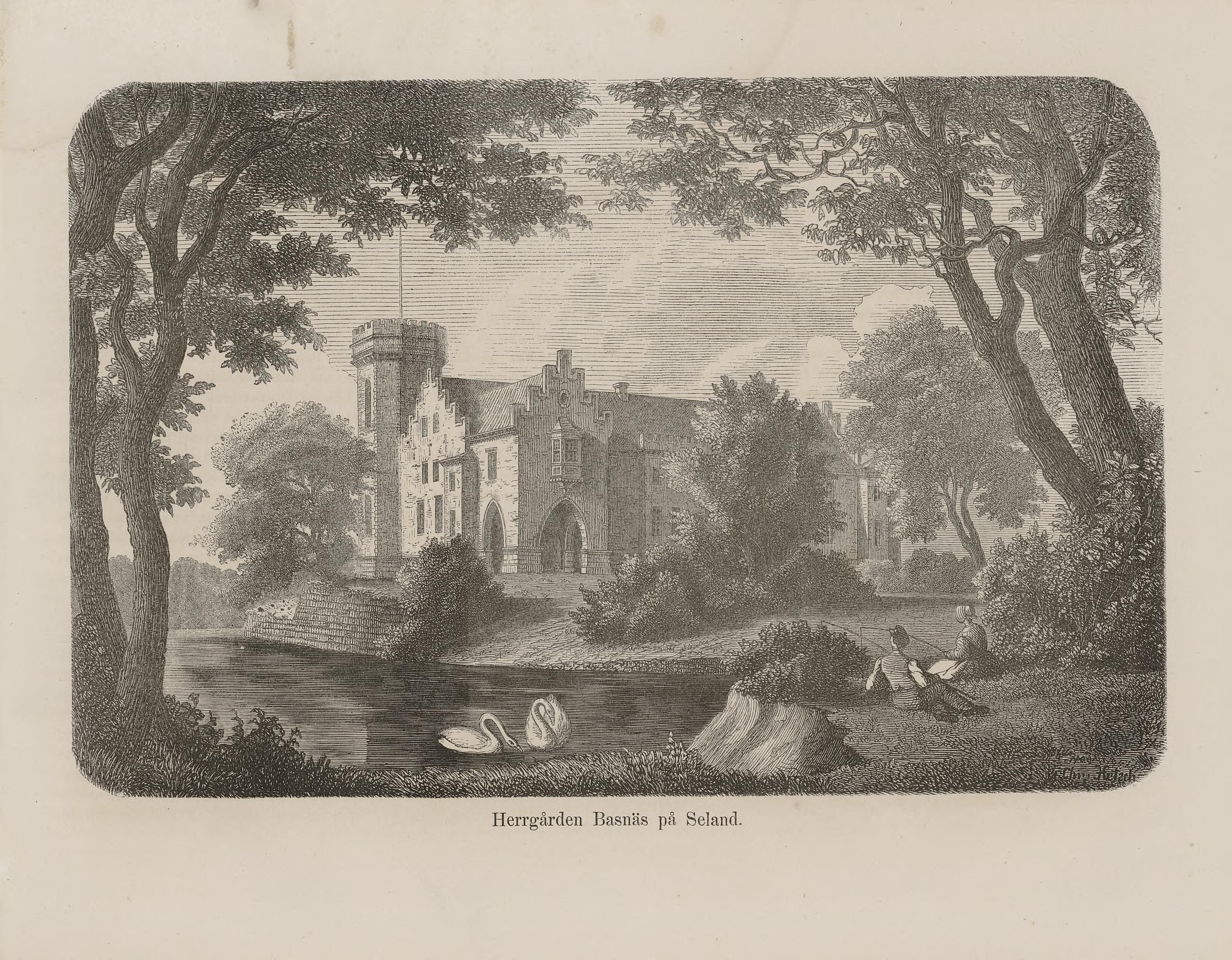
Basnæs in 1868

Basnæs was then sold by Fiedler's heirs for 245,000 rigsdaler to hofjægermester Jacob Brønnum Scavenius. Gus father of the same name of the same name had bought Ghorslev and a number making a fortune as a general trader in India. His wife Henriette was the daughter of count Otto Joakim Moltke of nearby Espe Manor. The writer Hans Christian Andersen often visited the family at Basnæs. He visited Basnæs more than 30 times between 1855 and 1872, spending approximately 15 months on the estate. Henriette Scavenius kept the estate after her husband's death. Their son, Otto Jacob Brønnum Scavenius, constructed a new main building.

Henriette stayed on the estate after her husband's death. It was later passed to their son Otto Jacob Brønnum Scavenius sikd it for DKK 1 million in 1906.

=== 20th century ===
In 1907, Basnæs was acquired by count Eiler Moltke. In 1933, he sold the estate to De Forenede Cichorietørrerier A/S. In 1952, it was converted into an independent company, Basnæs A/S.

== Architecture ==
The Gothic Revival style main building is a three-storey building with three corner towers designed by Gustav Friedrich Hetsch.

== List of owners ==
- ( -1366) Niels Pedersen
- (1366- ) Thure Knudsen
- (1400-1410) Biskop Peder Jensen Lodehat i Roskilde
- (1410- ) Abbed Metz i Næstved
- (1417) Biskop Jens i Roskilde
- ( - ) Anders Jakobsen Lunge
- ( -1451) Ove Jakobsen Lunge
- (1451-1460) Thyge Ovesen Lunge
- (1460-1504) Jesper Krafse
- (1504-1530) Hans Jespersen Krafse
- (1530-1566) Jesper Hansen Krafse
- (1566- ) Kirstine Bølle, gift Krafse
- ( -1599) Eiler Jespersen Krafse
- (1599-1602) Hilleborg Bølle, gift Krafse
- (1602-1603) Margrethe Hansdatter Krafse, gift Brahe
- (1603-1614) Otto Brahe
- (1614-1625) Birgitte Brahe
- (1614-1623) Helvig Brahe
- (1623- ) Henrik von d. Wisch
- ( -1625) Kronen
- (1625-1647) Axel Arenfeldt
- (1647-1676) Jacob Axelsen Arenfeldt
- (1647-1676) Jørgen Axelsen Arenfeldt
- (1676-1681) Anna Ramel, gift Reedtz
- (1681-1685) Ove Ramel
- (1685-1694) Christian Bielke
- (1694-1701) Vibeke Nielsdatter Juel, gift 1) Bielke, 2) Juel
- (1701-1705) Gregers Juel
- (1705-1716) Poul Eggers
- (1716) Lars Benzon
- (1716-1728) Laurence de Boysset
- (1728-1736) Christian Frederik de Boysset
- (1736-1749) Frederik Conrad von Holstein
- (1749-1751) Boet efter Frederik Conrad von Holstein
- (1751) Johan Baltzer Höserich
- (1751-1757) Peder Mikkelsen Qvistgaard
- (1757-1763) Frederik Otto von Wedel-Jarlsberg
- (1763-1764) Frederik Auguste Adolphe de Favin
- (1764-1765) Niels de Hofman
- (1765-1766) Peter Johansen Neergaard
- (1766-1768) Johan Thomas Petersen de Neergaard
- (1768-1778) Mathias Brønstorph
- (1778-1783) Jens Lowson
- (1783-1791) Charlotte Amalie Riis, gift Lowson
- (1783-1805) Christian L. Schütz
- (1805-1806) Frederik von Blücher
- (1806-1809) Helene de Thygeson, gift Blücher
- (1809-1829) Christian Frederik Fiedler
- (1829-1837) Juliane Marie Sporons, gift Fiedler
- (1837-1838) Boet efter Juliane Marie Sporons, gift Fiedler
- (1838-1850) Jacob Brønnum Scavenius
- (1850-1898) Henriette Moltke, gift Scavenius
- (1898-1907) Otto Jacob Brønnum Scavenius
- (1907-1933) Eiler Moltke
- (1933-1952) De Forenede Cichorietørrerier A/S
- (1952–present)Basnæs A/S
