= Ove Ramel =

Danish landowner

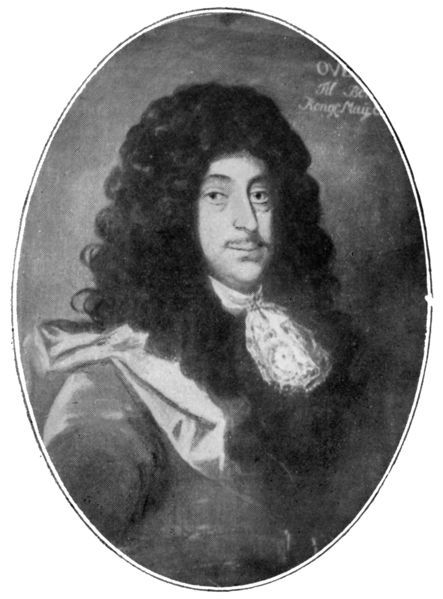
- Born: 1637
- Died: 29 January 1685 (aged 47–48); Denmark
- Occupation: Landowner

Ove Ramel (1637 – 29 January 1685) was a Danish landowner and administrator.

== Biography ==
Ramel was born in 1637 to Privy Counsellor Henrik Ramel and Margrethe Skeel. He studied at Sorø Academy and the University of Orléans. After Denmark lost Scania to Sweden, Ramel swore loyalty to the Swedish crown and became a Swedish nobleman. He married Mette Rosenkrantz in 1663.

During the Scanian War in 1677, Ramel returned to the Danish side, acting as General War Commissioner in Kristianstad and then a county governor of Helsingborg. Because of his changed allegiances, his Swedish estates were confiscated and an effigy in his likeness was executed in Malmö. He remained in Denmark after the 1679 peace agreement, where he became a state councillor. Ramel died on 29 January 1685 at Borreby and was buried at Sorø Abbey Church.
