= Lauge Beck =

Danish jurist (died 1607)

Lauge Beck (c. 1530 – 14 May 1607), or Lave Beck, was a Danish landowner, regional judge of Zealand and royal treasurer. His holdings included Førslevgaard and Beldringe on Zealand and Havrelykke on Lolland as well as the feefsof Roskildegaard and Ringsted Abbey. He was the father of Sivert Beck.

== Early life and education ==
Beck was born in circa 1530 to royal treasurer Joachim Beck (ca. 1500–72) and Anne Ravensberg (died 1573). He is possibly identical to the Lage Beck who was registered at the University of Wittenberg in 1542.

== Career ==
Beck is in 1557 and several times later mentioned as a canon at Roskilde Cathedral. In 1565, during the war with Sweden, he was appointed as provision master (proviantmester) for the Navy and later he was stationed in Halmstad as provision master for the Army.

He served as Treasurer from 1567 to 1575. From 1571 to 1584 and again from 1591, he was also appointed as district judge (landsdommer) of Zealand.

== Property ==
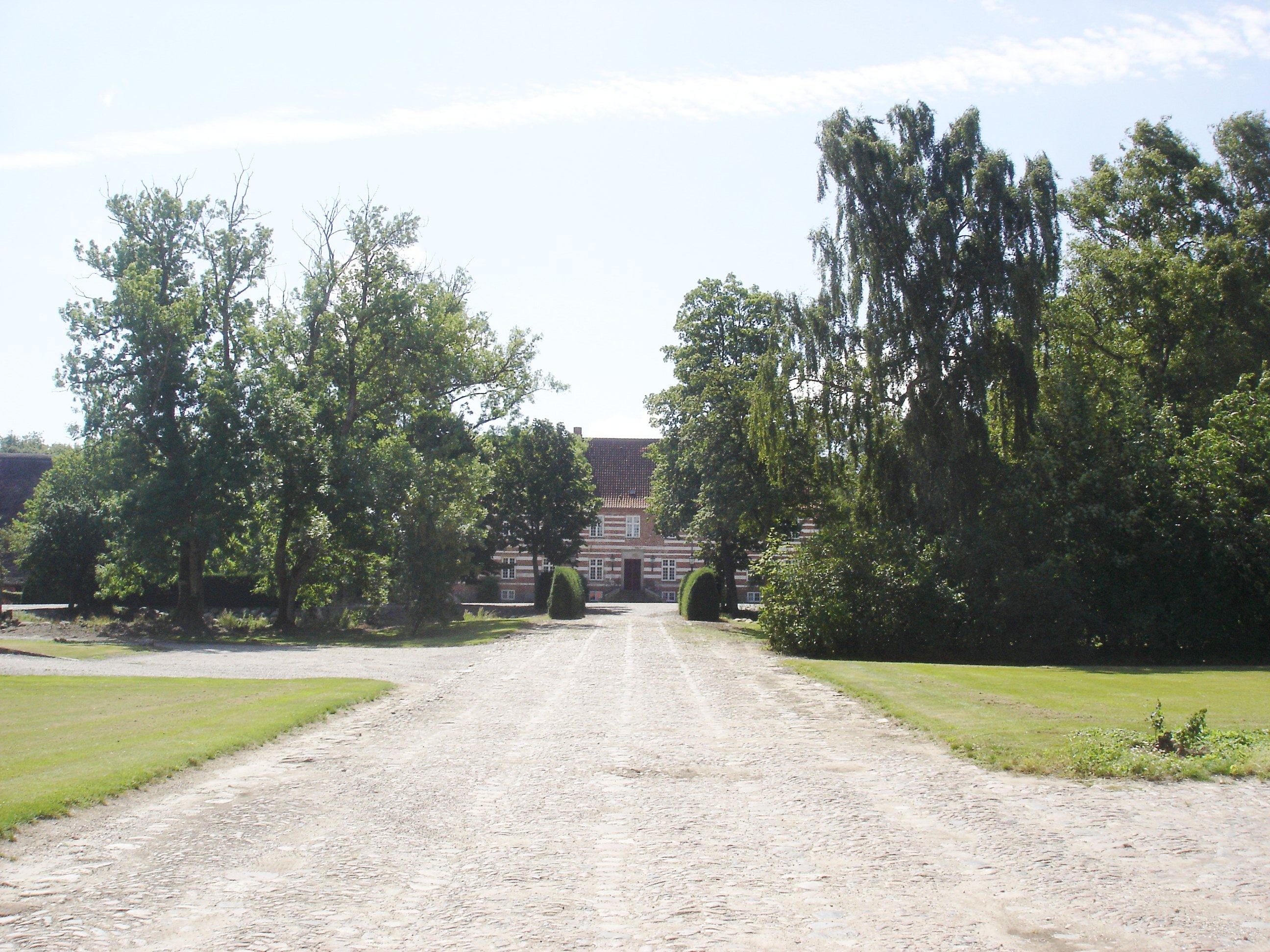
Beldringe's main building, constructed by Lauge Becvk's father circa 1561

Beck inherited Førslevgaard and Beldringe after his father in 1572. He also acquired considerable holdings on the island of Lolland from the Crown in exchange for other land, including Maribo Abbey. In 1593, he was able to establish the manor of Havrelykke. In 1596, he also acquired the no longer existing manor of Holme-Olstrup in the Parish of Olstrup.

In 1571–73 and again in 1577–87, Beck was lensman of Roskildegård, In 1591–1605, he was lensman of Ringsted Abbey.

== Personal life ==
Beck married twice. His first wife was Kirsten Huitfeldt (22 July 1544 at Bergenshus - 24 July 1563), a daughter of privy counsellor Christoffer Huitfeldt (c. 1501 – 1559) and Øllegaard Trolle (1513–78). His second wife was Agate Grubbe (1533 - 5 January 1623), a daughter of the owner of Tryggevælde Sivert Grubbe (died 1559) and Mette Ulfeldt (died 1562). – Far til Sivert B. He was the father of Jacob and Sivert Beck.

He died on 14 May 1607 and is buried at Førslev Church.
