= Axel Arenfeldt =

Danish landowner (1590–1647)

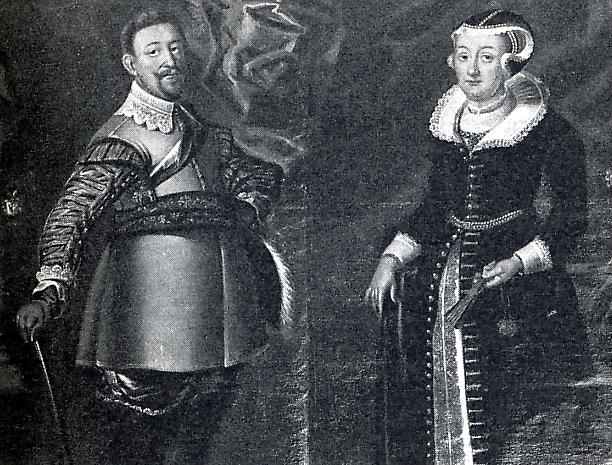
- Born: 26 November 1590
- Died: 4 November 1647 (aged 56); Basnæs, Denmark
- Occupation: Landowner
- Awards: Knight of the Order of the Elephant, 5 October 1634

Axel Arenfeldt (26 November 1590 – 4 October 1647) was a Danish government official and landowner. He served as Treasurer (rentemester) in 1623–27 and also as War Commissioner during the Thirty Years' War in 1626–27. He was on several occasions also used as a diplomatic messenger. He owned Basnæs at Skælskør from 1625 to 1647 and was lensmann of Giske (1623–43) and then later Stjernholm (1643–46) in Norway.

== Early life and education ==
Arenfeldt was the son of Hans Axelsen Arenfeldt of Rugård (died 1611) and Anne Jørgensdatter Marsvin (1569–1610) and the brother of Mogens Arenfeldt. He studied in Tübingen (1607), Giesen (1608) and Siena (1614).

== Career ==
Arenfeldt was secretary of Danish Chancellery in 1615–23. In 1620, on behalf of the king, he was prosecutor in the trial against Christoffer Dybvad. He served as Treasurer (rentemester) in 1623–27 and also as War Commissioner in connection with the king's involvement in the Thirty Years' War in 1626–27. He was on several occasions also used as a diplomatic messenger, for instance to Spain in 1621, Sweden in 1624, and the Netherlands in 1630. In 1634, he was created a Knight in the Order of the Elephant. In 1643, he was a tax commissioner in Jutland.

== Property ==
Arenfeldt was in 1623–43 lensmann of Giske and in 1643–46 of Stjernholm in Norway. During the war with Sweden he was for a while imprisoned by the Swedish troops. In the mid-1620s, he purchased Basnæs at Skælskør in Denmark. He constructed a lavish new main building and was in general known for his luxurious and wasteful lifestyle.

== Tapestries ==
At Skokloster Castle in Sweden there is a series of religious tapestries made in Gouda by Tobias Schaep for Axel Arenfeldt and his wife. During the Danish-Swedish War, these were taken to Sweden as spoils of war.

== Personal life ==
Arenfeldt married Marie Margrethe Ulfeldt (1619–1694), a daughter of Jakob Ulfeldt (1567–1630) and Birgitte Brockenhuus (1580–1656), on 13 April 1634 in Odense. He was the father of Jørgen Arenfeldt.

He was not particularly popular and was frequently involved in disputes with his neighbours. Rumour had it that he was quilty of embezzlement during his years as a war commissioner.

He died on 4 October 1647 at Basnæs and is buried at St. Peter's Church in Næstved.
