= Førslevgaard =

Manor house in Naestved Municipality, Denmark

General information
- Architectural style: Rococo
- Location: Næstved Municipality, Førslevvej 54; 4250 Fuglebjerg, Denmark
- Coordinates: 55°16′40.51″N 11°34′42.46″E
- Completed: 1726

Førslevgaard is a manor house and estate located on the road between Næstved and Slagelse, midway between the villages of Fuglebjerg and Vallensved, Næstved Municipality, approximately 90 kilometres southwest of Copenhagen, Denmark. It has since 1803 been owned by members of the de Neergaard family. The three-winged, Baroque-style main building was built for Carl Adolph von Plessen in 1726. It was listed on the Danish registry of protected buildings and places in 1918.

Nearby Førslev Church belonged to Førslevgaard from 1544 to 1914. A number of former owners from the influential Beck family, who owned the manor from 1495 to 1659, are buried in the church.

== History ==
=== Early history ===
Førslevgaard takes its name after the village of Førslev where it was located. It is first mentioned in 1347 when it was bought by Jep Andersen Halvegge from Hælenborg Olufsdatter Bille solgte.

Jep Andersen Halvegge was succeeded by his son, Evert Jepsen Halvegge, whose daughter and only heir married Peder Mogensen.

=== Beck family ===
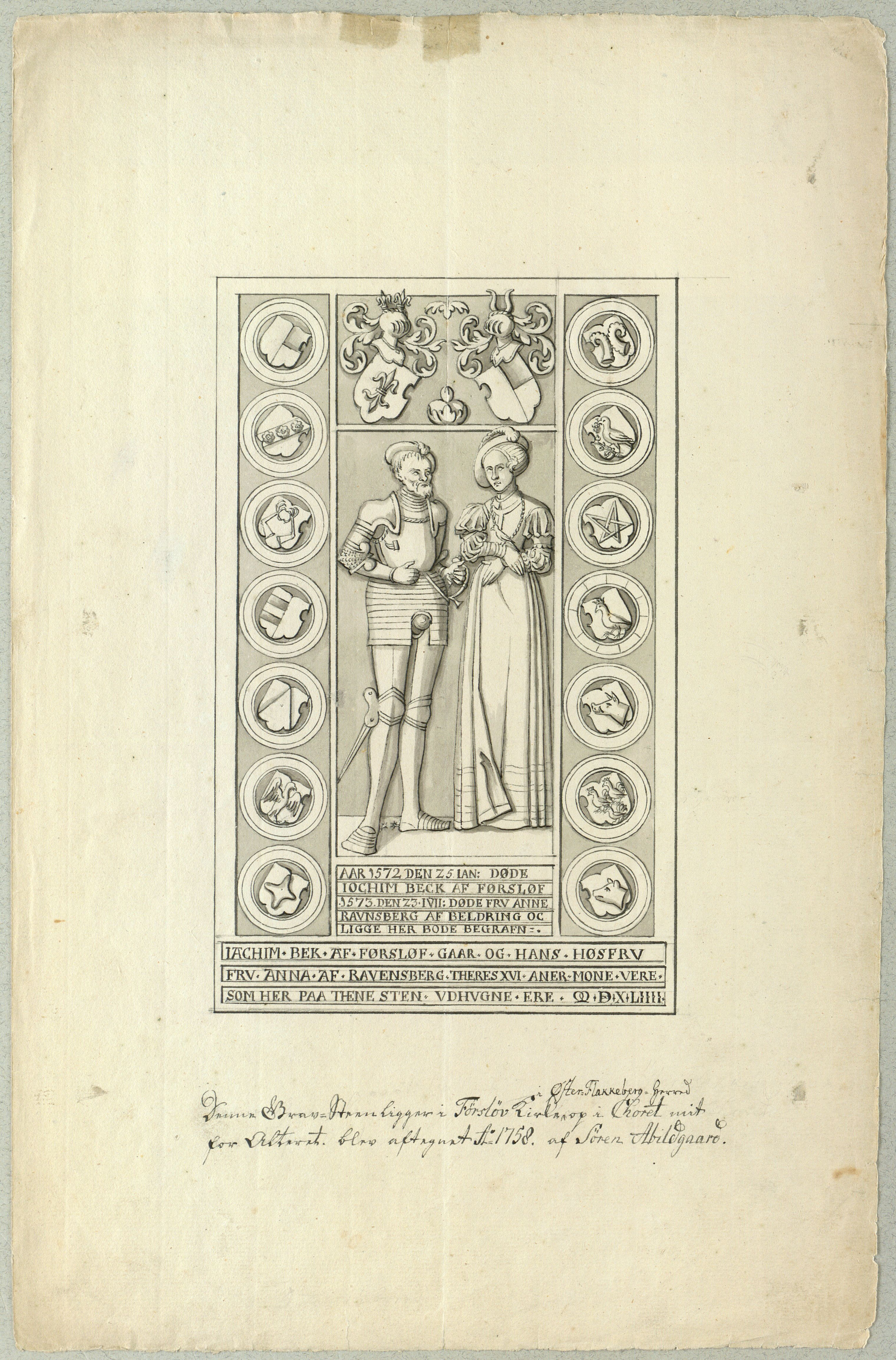
Drawing of Joachim Beck's grave in Førslev Church

Peder Mogensen's daughter, Margrethe, married to Lasse Beck. Their son, Joachim Beck. who served as regional judge and royal treasurer for Rastern Denmark, expanded the estate with more land and tenant farms. In 1544, Gørslevgaard was granted the status of birk.

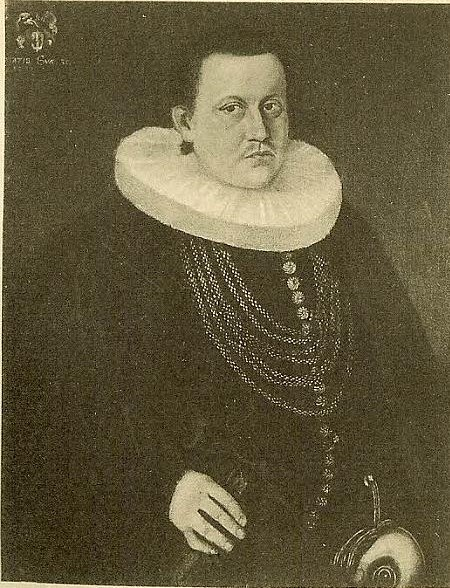
Sivert Beck

On Joachim Beck's death, Førslevgaard was both passed to his son Lauge Beck while Beldringe was passed to Albert Joachimsen Beck. Lauge Beck's other holdings included Haverelykke on Lolland, Olstrup on Zealand and the royal fiefs of Roskildegaard and Ringsted Abbey. He succeeded his father in the offices of regional judge (landsdommer) and royal treasurer.

Lauge Beck was the father of Sivert Beck. Like his father and grandfather before him, he would become a major landowner. He inherited Førslevgaard, Vibygård and Tågerød from his father in 1607. Through his marriage, he also acquired Herlufstrup on Zealand and Vandås, Näsbyholm, Klabberup and Frenderup in Scania

=== Changing owners, 1661–1823 ===
Gørslevgaard passed out of the family when Lauge Beck's widow, Margrethe Grubbe, married Steen Hohendorff and he bought out Beck's other heirs.

In 1685, Hohendorff sold Førslevgaard to Hans von Bøfke. He placed more land directly under the manor by dissolving five tenant fames. In 1685, Førslevgård was acquired by Hans von Bøfke. The estate then changed hands several times over the next decades. None of the owners lived on the estate and the buildings gradually fell into neglect.

=== The Plessen family ===
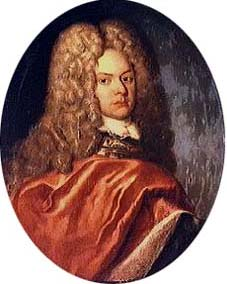
Carl Adolph von Plessen

In 1723, Førslevgaard was acquired by Carl Adolph von Plessen. He constructed a new main building, purchased more land and dissolved the remaining eight tenant farms in the village of Førslev.

Carl Adolph von Plessen was the owner of seven estates at the time of his death. He had never marriage and therefore established a fideikommis under the name "De Plessiske Fidei-Commis-Godser" and left it to his brothers' male descendents. A dispute arose over the distribution of the inheritance and a final settlement was not reached until 1778. The result was that Førslevgaard, Fuglebjergggard and Fodbygaard went to Christian Frederik von Plessen. His mother was entitled to three rooms at Førslevgaard as well as a pension for her maintenance. In 1789, he ceded Førslevgaard and the other estates to his brother, Carl Adolph. He commenced the work with implementing the agricultural reform programme of the time, for instance by discontinuing corvée (Danish: Hoveri) on his estates and by granting the copyholders a right to pass their farms on to their children (Danish: Arvefæste).

=== The de Neergaard family ===
In 1802, Det Plessenske Fideicommis was dissolved. Shortly thereafter, Carl Adolph von Plessen chose to sell Førslevgaard to Peter Johansen Neergaard. Neergaard was one of the largest Danish landowners of his time. His many estates were divided between his many sons. In 1830, he passed Førslevgaard and Fuglebjerggaard to his third-eldest son, Peter Johansen de Neergaard (1803-1872). In 1842, he increased his holdings by also acquiring Faarevejle on Langeland. In 1830, he had also acquired Mejlgaard but he sold it again in 1845.

Peter Johansen de Neergaard (1803-1872) left Førslevgaard and Fuglebjerg to his son Jakob Edvard de Neergaard (1855-1925). He never married and died without offspring. He left Førslevgaard and Guflebjerg to his nephew Wenzel Rudolf Flach de Neergaard (1892-1968). He was the son of Holger Flach de Neergaard (1868-1958) nd Louise von Hedemann (1865-1937). His eldest son Johan Wenzel Flach de Neergaard (1921-2006) became a co-owner of Førslevgaard in 1947 and its sold owner in 1964. His younger brother Holger Flach de Neergaard (1822-) received Fuglebjerggaard. Om 109+. Gørslevgaard was passed to Neergaard's son Johan Nicolaj Flach de Neergaard.

== Today ==
The current owner is Johan Nicolaj Flach de Neergaard.

== List of owners ==
- ( -1374) Hælenborg Olufsdatter Bille
- (1374-1408) Jep Andersen Halvegge
- (1408-1442) Evert Jepsen Halvegge
- (1442-1495) Peder Mogensen Ravensberg
- (1495-1501) Lasse Beck
- (1501- ) Margrethe Beck (née Ravensberg)
- (1501-1572) Joachim Beck
- (1572-1607) Lauge Beck
- (1607-1623) Sivert Beck
- (1623-1648) Steen Beck
- (1623-1659) Lauge Beck
- (1659-1661) Margrethe Beck (née Grubbe, later 2) Hohendorff)
- (1661-1685) Steen Hohendorff
- (1685-1705) Hans von Bøfke
- (1705-1706) Peter Rodsteen
- (1706-1709) Hector Gottfried Masius
- (1709-1721) Heirs of Hector Gottfried Masius
- (1721-1723) Frederik von der Maase
- (1723-1758) Carl Adolph von Plessen
- (1758-1763) Frederik Christian von Plessen
- (1763-1789) Christian Frederik von Plessen
- (1789-1803) Carl Adolph von Plessen
- (1803-1830) Peter Johansen Neergaard
- (1830-1872) Peter Johansen de Neergaard
- (1872-1895) Peter Johansen de Neergaard
- (1895-1925) Jakob Edvard de Neergaard
- (1925-1964) Wenzel Rudolf Flach de Neergaard
- (1947-1980) Johan Wenzel Flach de Neergaard
- (1980- ) Johan Nicolaj Flach de Neergaard
