= Sivert Beck =

Danish civil servant (b. 1566, d. 1623)

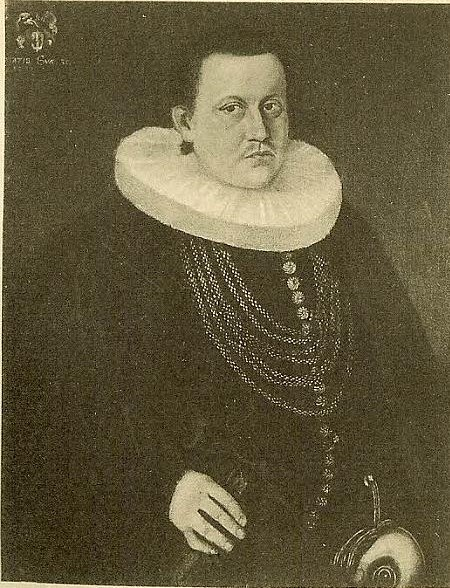
- Portrait of Sivert Beck
- Born: 18 November 1566; Roskilde, Denmark
- Died: 2 January 1623 (aged 56)
- Occupations: Landowner, government official
- Office: Treasurer (Rentemester) of Denmark
- Spouse: Lisbet Bille
- Children: Lauge Beck, Steen Beck
- Parent(s): Lauge Beck; Agate Grubbe

Sivert Beck (18 November 1566 – 2 January 1623) was a Danish landholder and government official. He served as treasurer (rentemester) from 1596 until his death.

== Early life and education ==
Beck was born in the Bishop's House in Roskilde, the son of district judge Lauge Beck (c. 1530– 1607) and Agate Grubbe (1533–1623). He spent 1580–88 abroad, partly accompanied by his nephew, Sivert Grubbe. He studied at the universities in Wittenberg, Leipzig and Jena.

== Career ==
In 1589 Beck began working at the Danish Chancellery. In 1590 he assumed the title of secretary. In 1594, he was granted a prelate at Aarhus Cathedral in 1594 but in 1608 exchanged it for a canonry at Roskilde Cathedral. In both cases he was required to stay at the cathedral when no longer in royal service. Late in life, he acted as guardian for Christian IV's illegitimate søn, Christian Ulrik Gyldenløve.

== Property ==
Beck was a major landowner. He inherited Førslevgaard, Vibygård and Tågerød from his father in 1607. Through his marriage, he also acquired Herlufstrup on Zealand and Vandås, Näsbyholm, Klabberup and Frenderup in Scania. In 1599–1623, he was lensmann of Giske in Norway.

== Personal life ==
On 5 September 1602, Beck married Lisbet Bille (1576–1656). She was a daughter of Steen Bille (1527–86) and Kirsten Lindenov (died 1612). Their children included Lauge Beck (1614–59) and Steen Beck.
