= Lille Strandstræde 22 =

Historic building in Copenhagen, Denmark

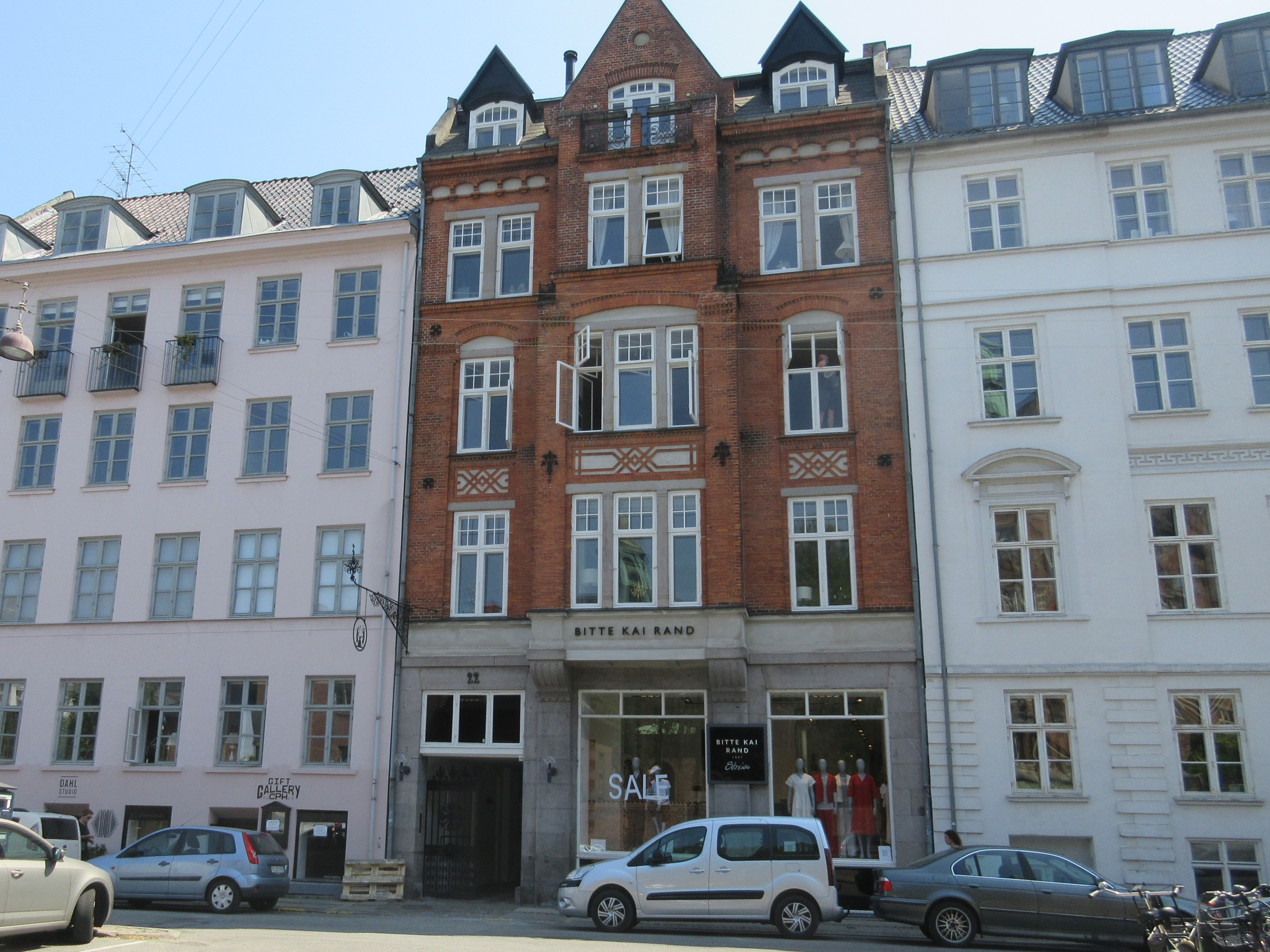
- Interactive map of the Lille Strandstræde 22 area

General information
- Location: Copenhagen, Denmark
- Coordinates: 55°40′52.72″N 12°35′25.37″E
- Completed: 1900

Design and construction
- Services engineer: Georg Wittrock

Lille Strandstræde 22 is a National Romantic building in the Nyhavn Quarter of Copenhagen, Denmark. It was constructed in 1900 as the new headquarters of F. W. Doberck & søn, a manufacturer of decorative metalwork. The company was based in the building until at least the 1950s. Its former sign, featuring a depiction en silhouette of two smiths at work by the ansil, is still seen on the facade. The elaborate gate was also created by the firm.

== History ==
=== Early history ===
Back in the late 17th century, the site was part of a large property owned by Admiral Jens Rodsten. In Copenhagen's first cadastre from 1689, Rodsten's property was listed as No. 24 in St. Ann's East Quarter. It was later divided into a number of smaller properties.

The property now known as Lille Strandstræde 22 was acquired by brewer and customs official Søren Sørensen (1669–1709). He was married to Anne Elisabeth Utrecht.

=== Solberg family ===
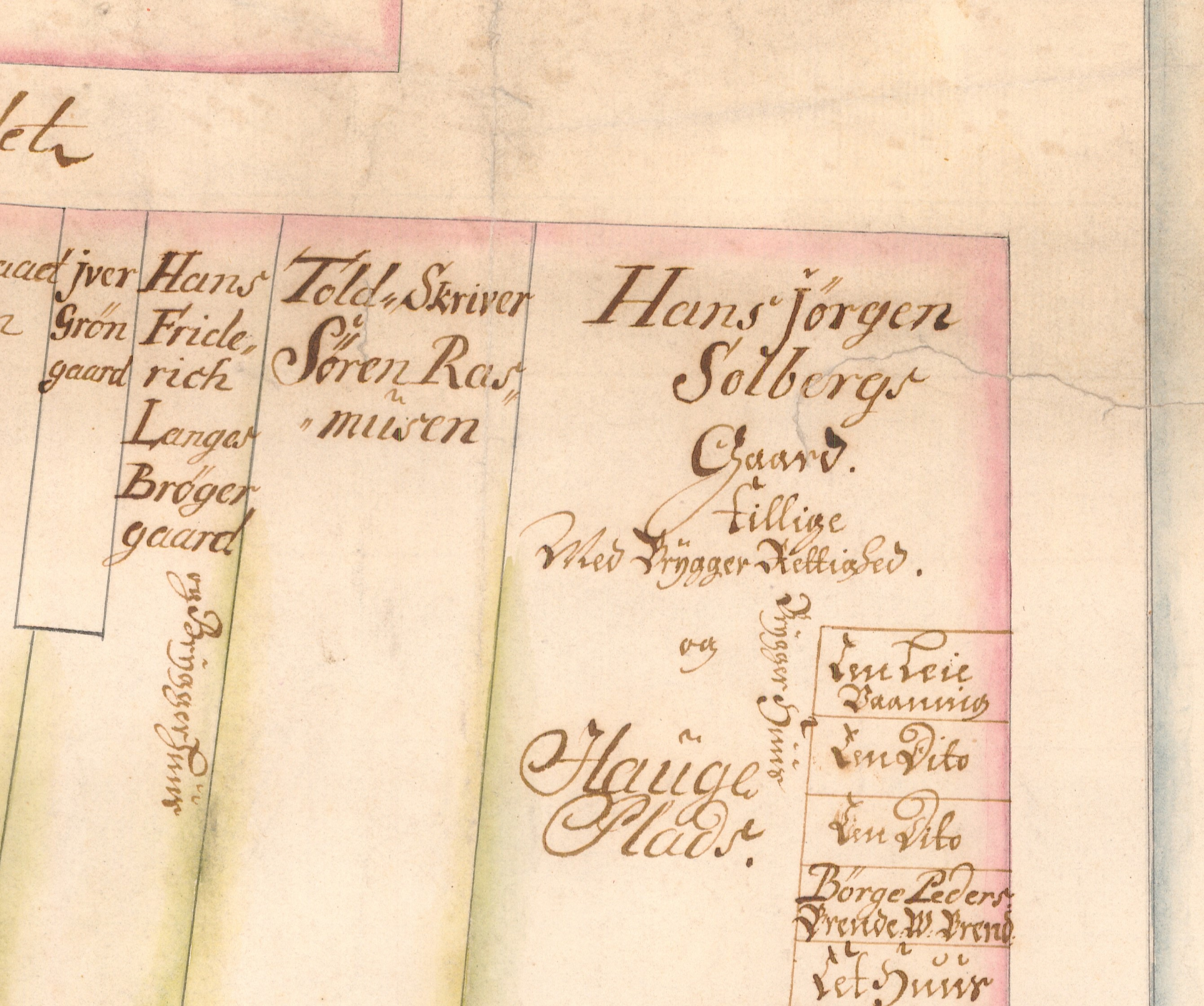
Hans Kørgen Soelberg's property seen in a detail from a plan from 1731

Sørensen's daughter Edel Sørensdatter (1685–1762) married in around 1708–1710 to the Norwegian general trader and timber merchant Hans Jørgen Soelberg (1681–1753). The couple took over her father's property on Lille Strandstræde. In Copenhagen's new cadastre of 1756, it was listed as No. 96 in St. Ann's East Quarter.

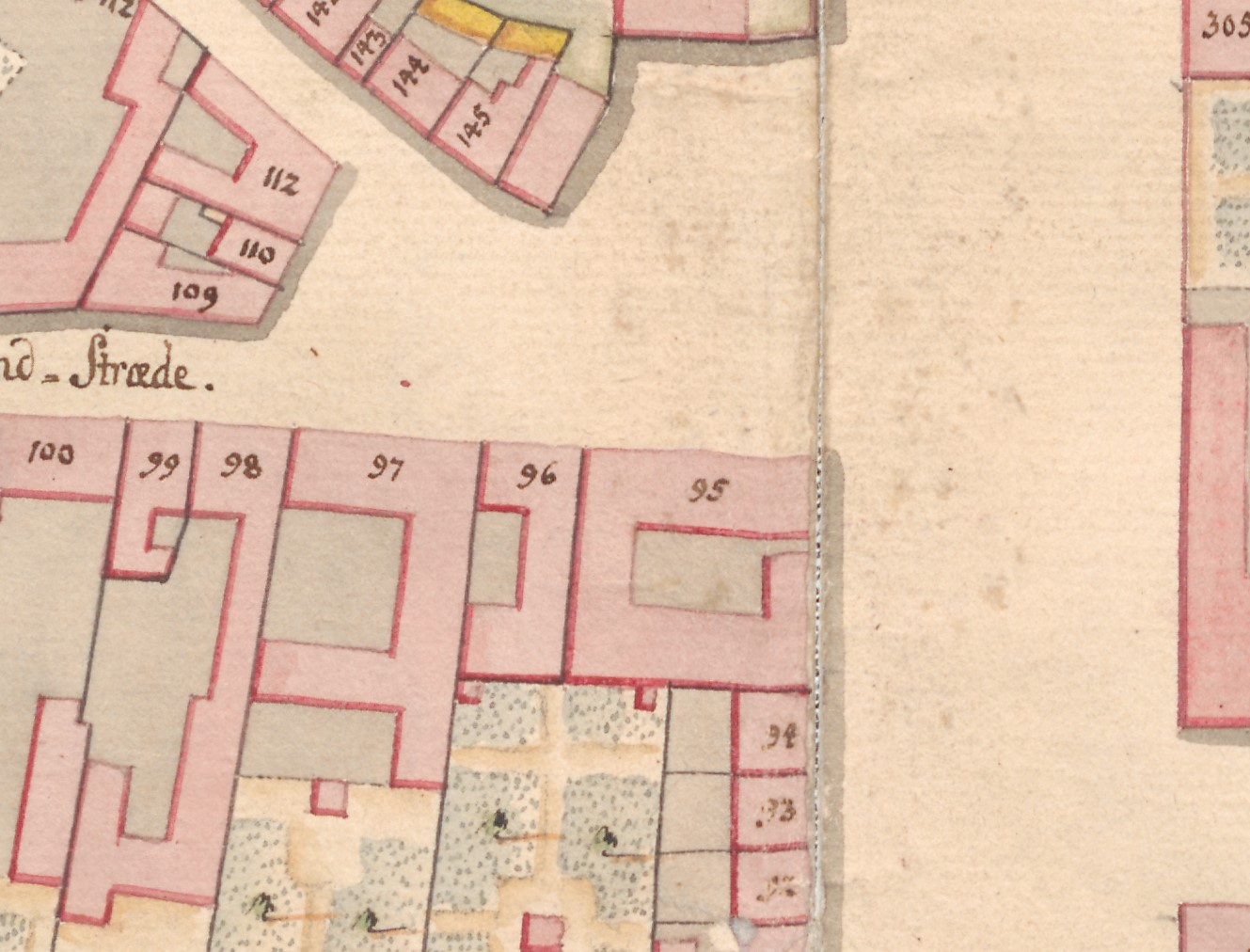
No. 96 seen in a detail from Christian Gedde's map of St. Ann's East Quarter, 1757

Edel Sørensdatter kept the property until her death. She survived several of her eight children. Her eldest daughter Anna Cathrine Hansdatter Soelberg (c. 1712–1757) was married to the theologian Søren Christensen Lemvigh. In 1754, he was appointed pastor of the Garrison Church. The daughter Amalie Elisabeth Soelberg (1712–1770) was married to renteskriver Edward Holst (-1759). The third daughter Anna Elisabeth Soelberg (1715–1757) was married to the wealthy general trader and councilman Abraham Falch (1712–1776). The eldest son Søren Solberg (1718–1755) was a brewer. The second son Christian Soelberg (1831–785) was a naval lieutenant.

=== David Bradt ===
The property was later acquired by chancellery secretary David Bradt. His property was home to eight residents in two households at the 1787 census.David Bradt resided in the building with his wife Johanne Henriette Braun, their five-year-old daughter Frideriche Louisa, one male servant and one maid. Jusine Nissen, a widow with means, resided in the building with one male servant and one maid.

=== Marcher family ===
The property was later acquired by ship captain Rasmus Hansen Marcher (1742–1812). His property was home to two households at the 1801 census. Rasmus Marcher resided in the building with his wife Lovise Æpvise Behling (1868–1913), their 18-year-old daughter Albertine Elise Marcker, 11-year-old Samuel Loblau, lieutenant Christian Conrad Gercken and three maids. Peter Carl Jessen (1772–1830), a kammerråd, resided in the building with his wife Johanne Wilhelmine Caroline Wildenradt (1775–1804), their five-year-old son Frederik Jessen, his sister Regine Margrethe Feddersen (née Wildenradt, 1770–1842; widow of pastor Broder Feddersen, 1749–1797), her three children (aged four to 15) and one maid.

In the new cadastre of 1806, the property was listed as No. 64 in St. Ann's East Quarter.

=== Eskildsen family ===
Albertine Elisabeth Marcher married to chief pilot and later harbour captain Erik Eskildsen (1776–1856). They kept the property after her parents' death.

At the time of the 1834 census, No. 64 was home to two households. Erik and Albertine Eskildsen resided on the ground floor with their daughters Amalie and Albertine and three maids. Michael Holm and Søren Johannes Holm, two brothers, both of them jurists, resided together on the first floor.

The residents were more or less the same at the 1840 census.

=== Hotel Stockholm ===
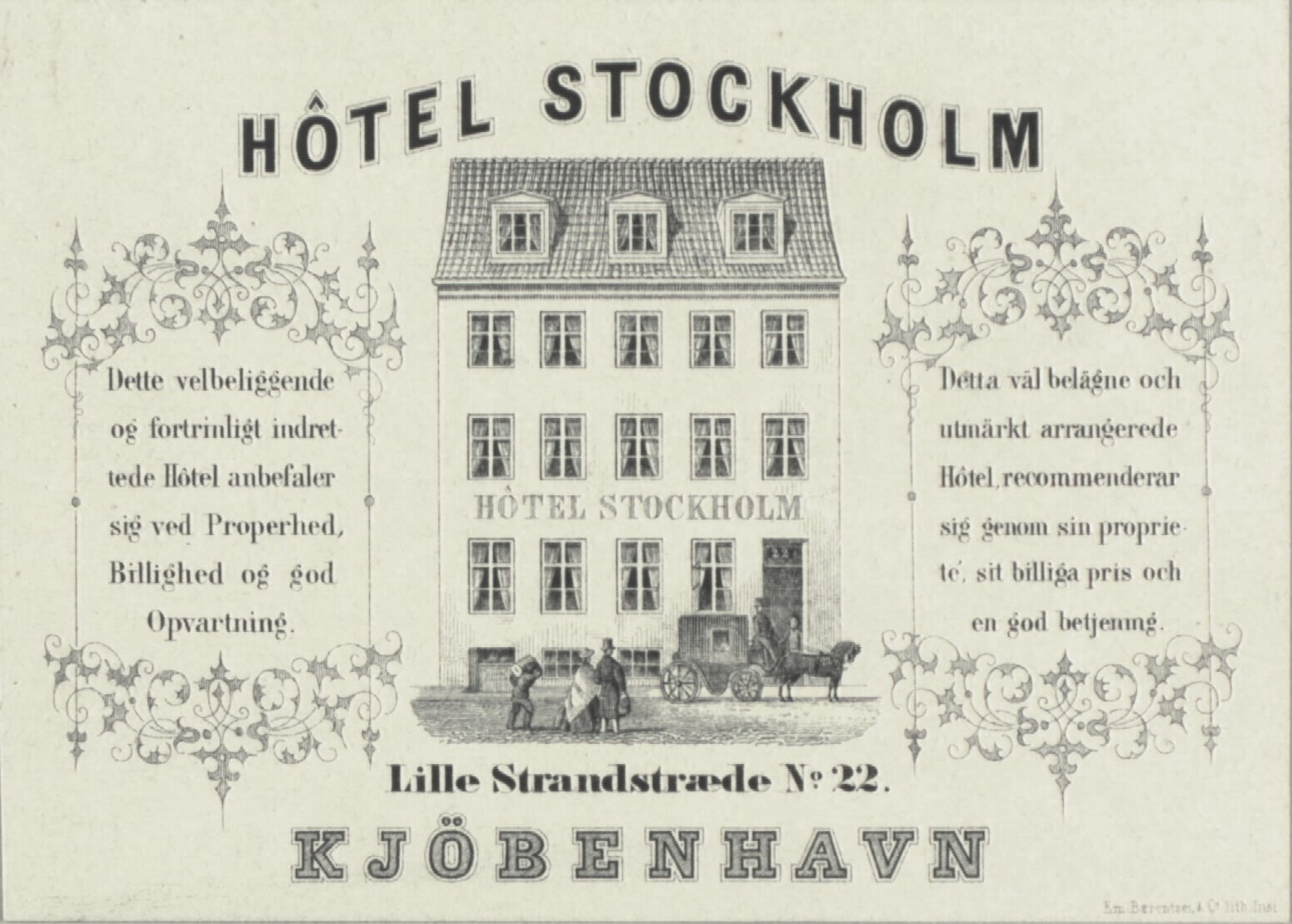
Advert for Hotel Stockholm

The property was after Erik Rskildsen's death in 1856 converted into a hotel under the name Hotel Stockholm.

The property was home to 17 residents in four households at the 1860 census. Sven Johansen, the hotel patron, resided on the ground floor with his wife Johanne Johansen, a lodger, two male servants and three maids. The painter Louis August Framcois Aumont, who then worked for the Ministry of the Navy, was also a resident in the building. Johan Abrahamsen Reikenback, a barkeeper, resided in the basement with his wife Hanne Reikenback (née Hinrigsdatter), a sailor and his nine-year-old daughter. Christjan Ludovik Bode, a basketmaker, resided in another part of the basement with his wife Dorthea Augusta Bode and their two daughters (aged three and five).

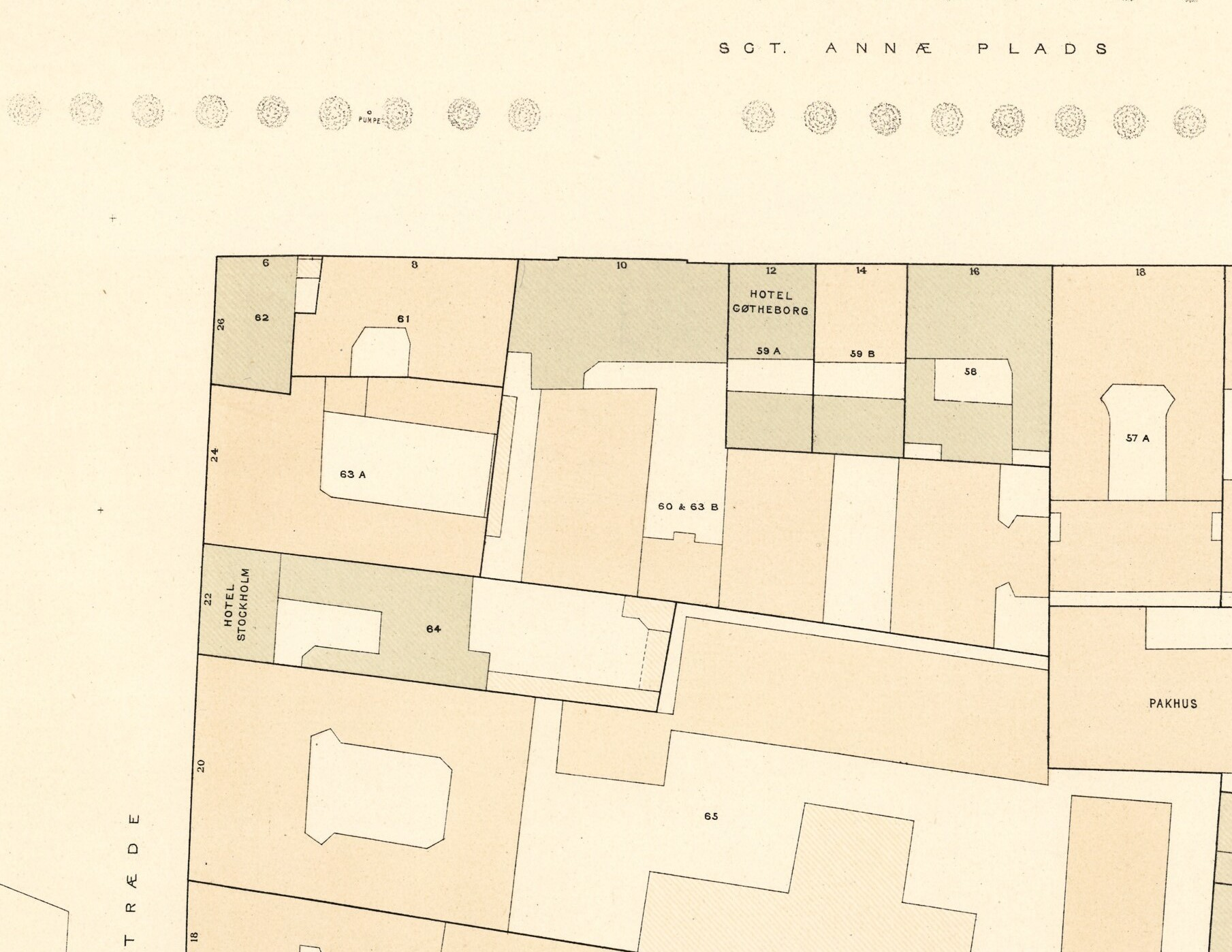
Hotel Stockholm seen in a detail from one of Berggreen's block plans of St. Ann's East Quarter, 1886–88

At the 1880 census, Lille Strandstræde 22 was home to 32 residents. Niels Peter Petersen, a new hotel patron, resided on the ground floor with his wife Bothilde Jensen, their 13-year-old son, two waiters and three maids. Hans Larsen, a barkeeper, resided in the basement with his wife Johanne Marie Hansen, their one-year-old twins, a maid and three lodgers. Most of the other residents were either employees or low-income lodgers in small households.

=== F. W. Doberck & søn ===
On 1 May 1899, Arthur Doberck purchased the property. In June 1886, he had succeeded his father as the owner of F. W. Doberck & søn, a manufacturer of decorative metalwork based at Store Strandstræde 9. He demolished the old hotel building and embarked on the construction of a new building to designs by Georg Wittrock. The new building was already inaugurated in April the following year.

Louis Arthur Doberck died just 48 years old in 1907. His widow Emilie Doberck continued the firm for six more years but on 11 March 1913 sold it to Carl Julius Emil Amundin (born Jørgensen), a close friend of her late, bought. His son Svend Amundin (born 31 July 1900) was made a partner on 6 October 1941. F. W. Doberck & søn's Eftf. ("F. W. Doberck & son's Successor") was still based in the building in 1950.

== Architecture ==
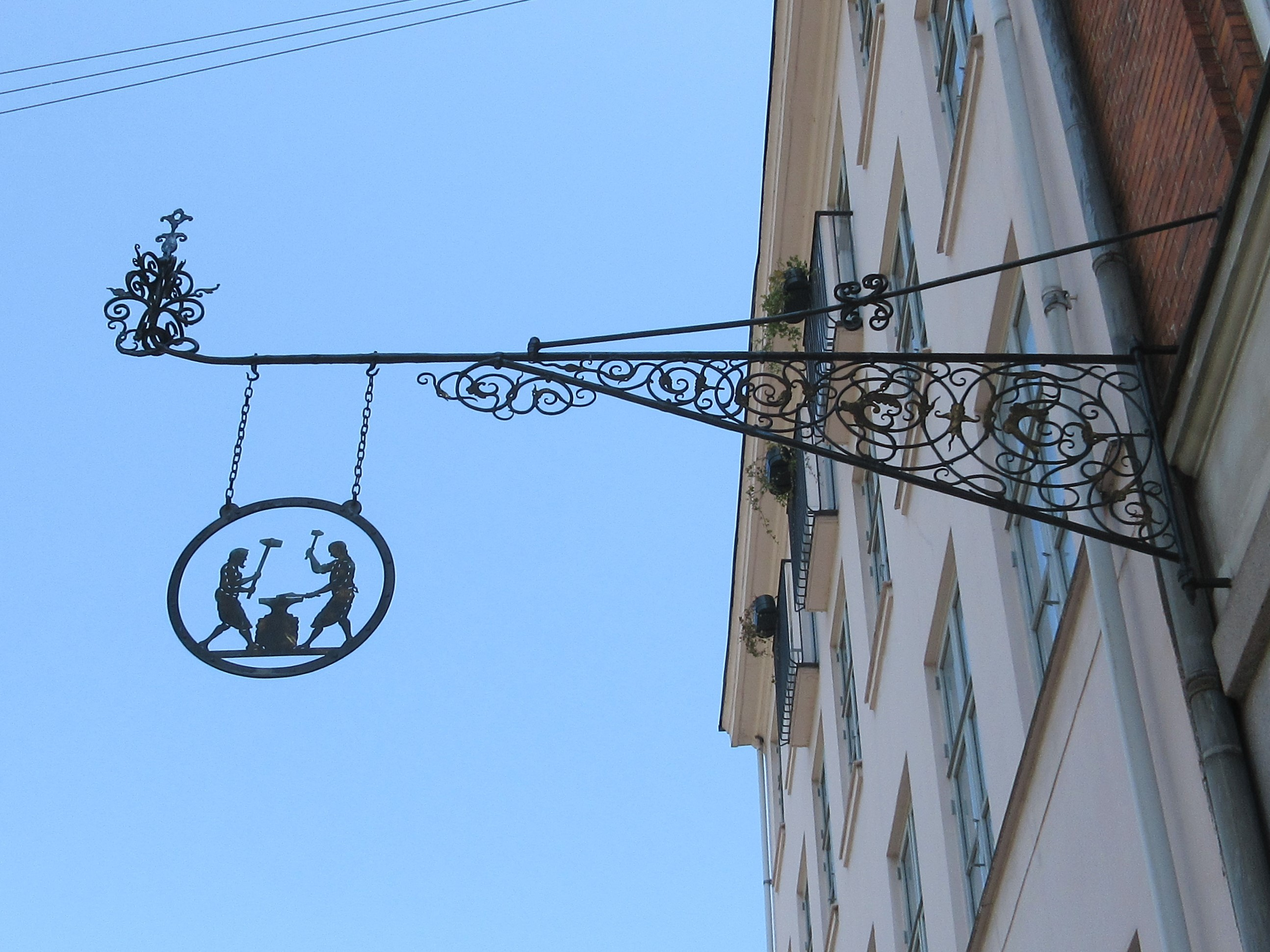
The sign

Lille Strandstræde 22 is a three-winged, four-storey building. The facade features a projecting bay window motif on the three upper floors. It is crowned by a steep, gabled wall dormer flanked by two gabled dormer windows. Three friezes with geometric patterns and two decorative wall anchors are seen between the windows of the second and third floor. The metal gate in the bay furthest to the left was created by the firm for which the building was constructed. A metal sign with two smiths at work by the anvil projects from the facade next to the gateway.

== Today ==
In 1984, Lille Strandstræde 22 was sold as condominiums. The property is now owned by the individual owners via E/F Lille Strandstræde 22 (founded 30 August 1984). A Bitte Kai Tand flagship shop is located on the ground floor.

== Gallery ==
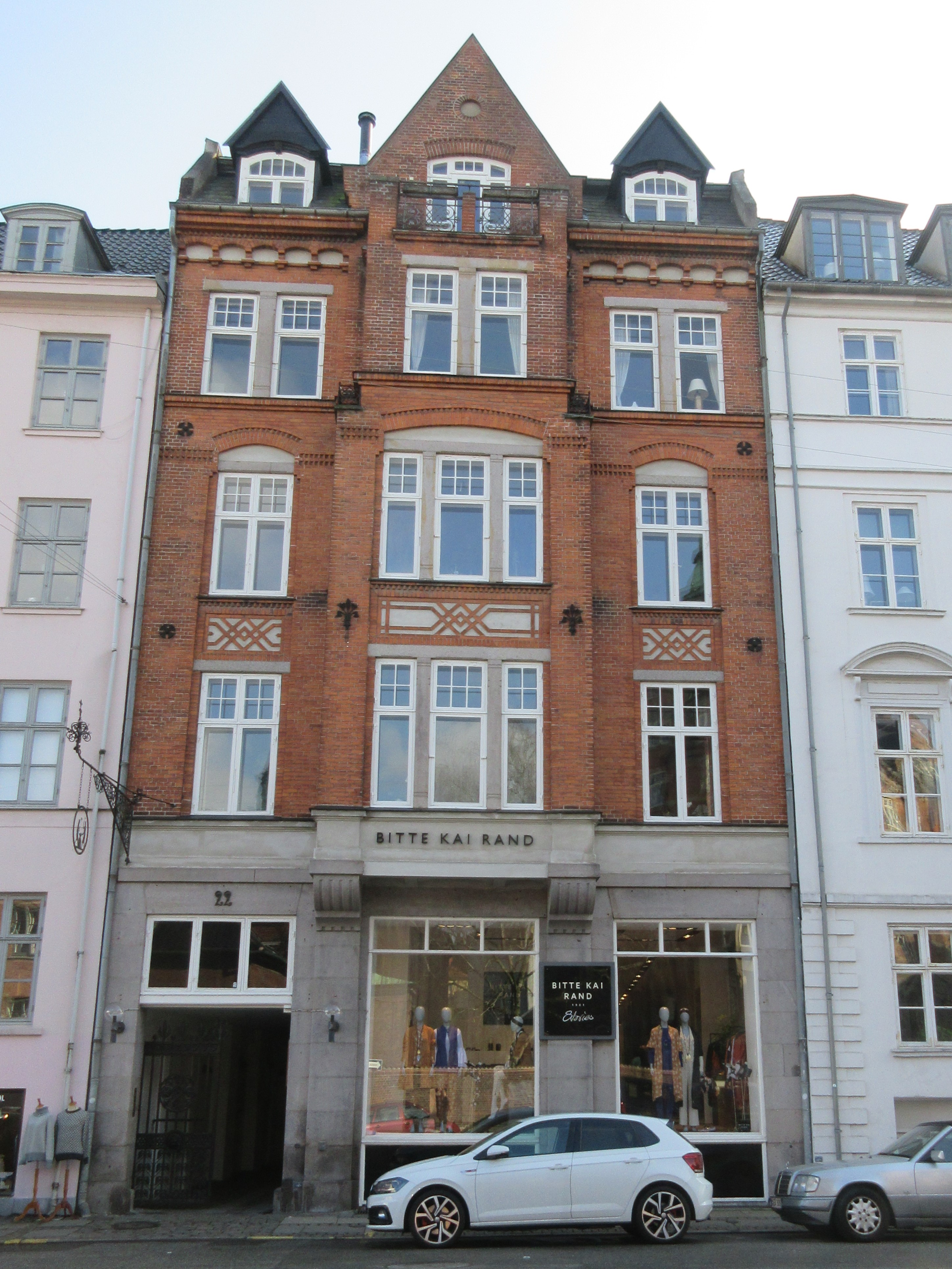

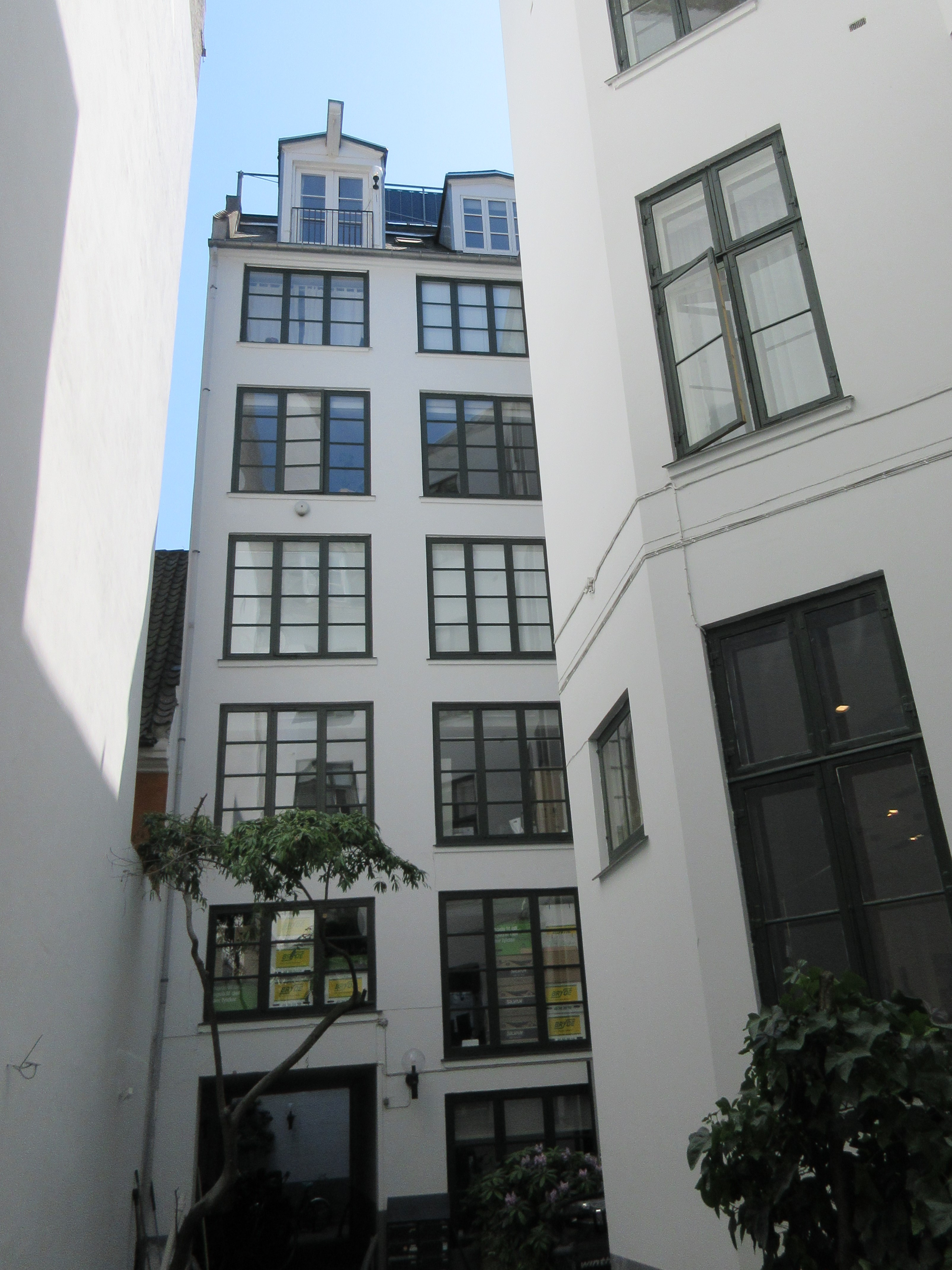
The rear wing

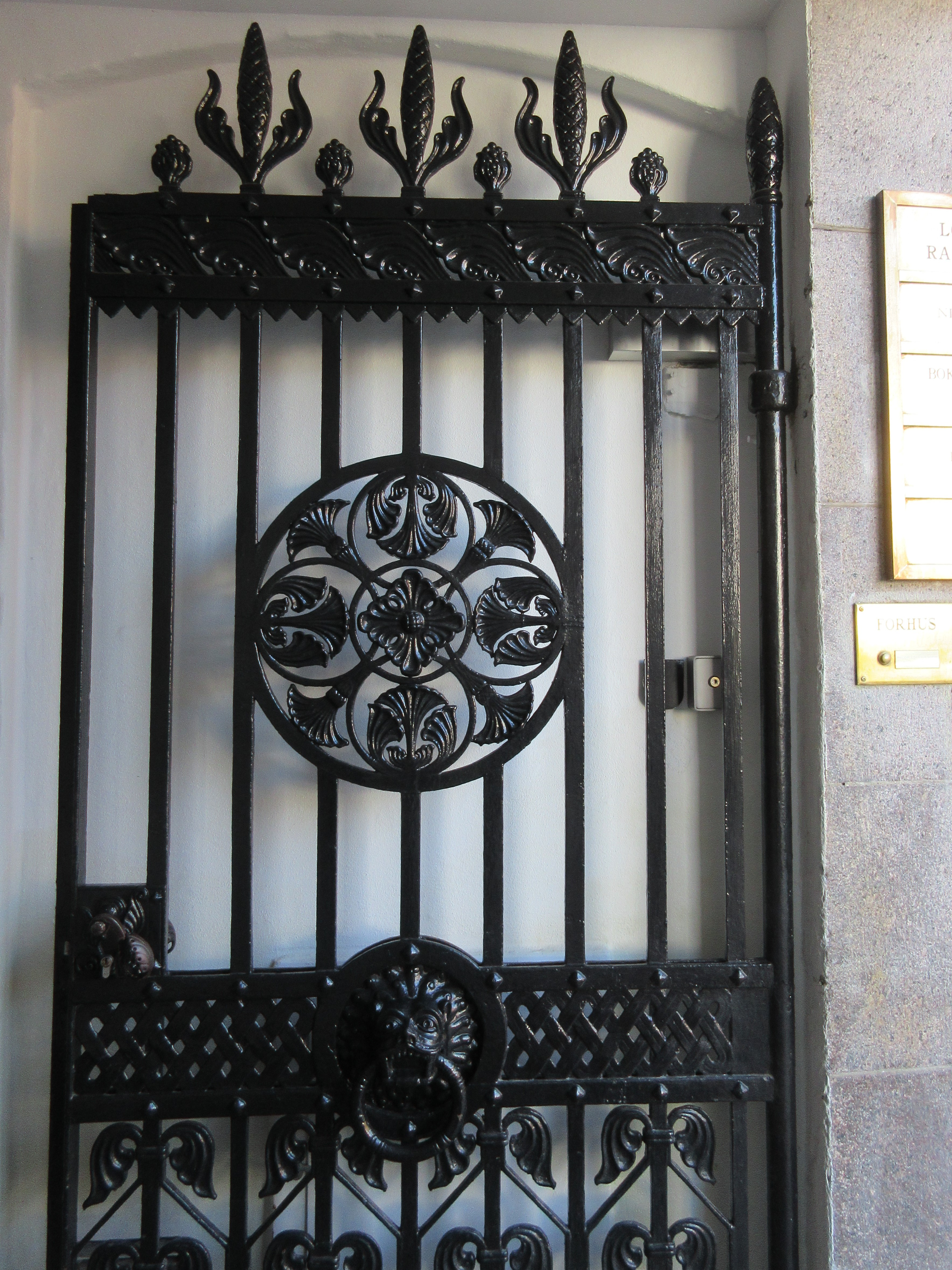
Detail of the gate

== See also ==
- Store Strandstræde 19–21
