= F. W. Doberck & søn =

Danish decorative metal manufacturer

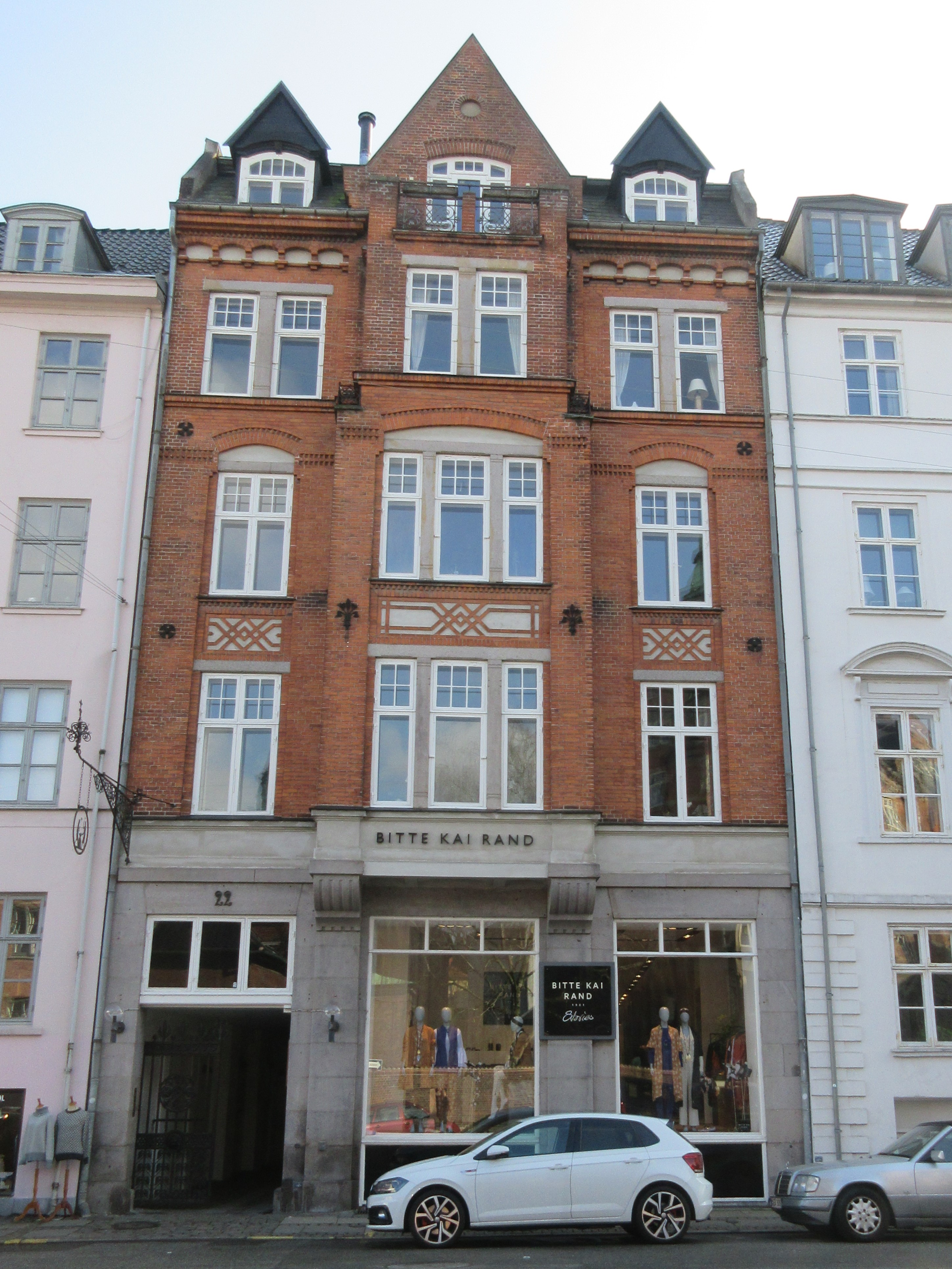
The company's former headquarters at Lille Strandstræde 22 in Copenhagen

F. W. Doberck & søn was a Danish manufacturer of decorative metal work based in Copenhagen, Denmark. It created decorative metalwork for a number of buildings, including Copenhagen City Hall. The product range also comprised chandeliers and other fine decorative lighting fixtures.

== History ==
Friedrich Wilhelm Doberck was born in Közlin, Prussia. The family moved to Copenhagen when he was eight years old. He apprenticed as a smith and was on 6 February 1821 granted citizenship as a frimester. His first workshop was located in the cellar at Store Kongensgade 49.

Friedrich Wilhelm Doberck's son Frederik Wilhelm Doberck was an apprentice in the firm before spending three years abroad. He continued the firm after his father's retirement in August 1846 and moved the operations to new premises first at Store Strandstræde 6 and in 1862 to the building at Store Strandstræde 9.

Frederik Wilhelm Doberck's third-eldest son Louis Arthur Doberck completed an apprenticeship in the firm in 1880 and then continued his education abroad. He took on the family business in January 1886. He purchased the property at Lille Strandstræde 22 in 1899 and completed a new building at the site to designs by the architect Georg Wittrock the following year.

Louis Arthur Doberck died just 48 years old in 1907. His widow Emilie Doberck continued the firm for six more years but on 11 March 1913 sold it to Carl Julius Emil Amundin (born Jørgensen), a close friend of her late, bought. His son Svend Amundin (born 31 July 1900) was made a partner on 6 October 1941.

== Legacy ==
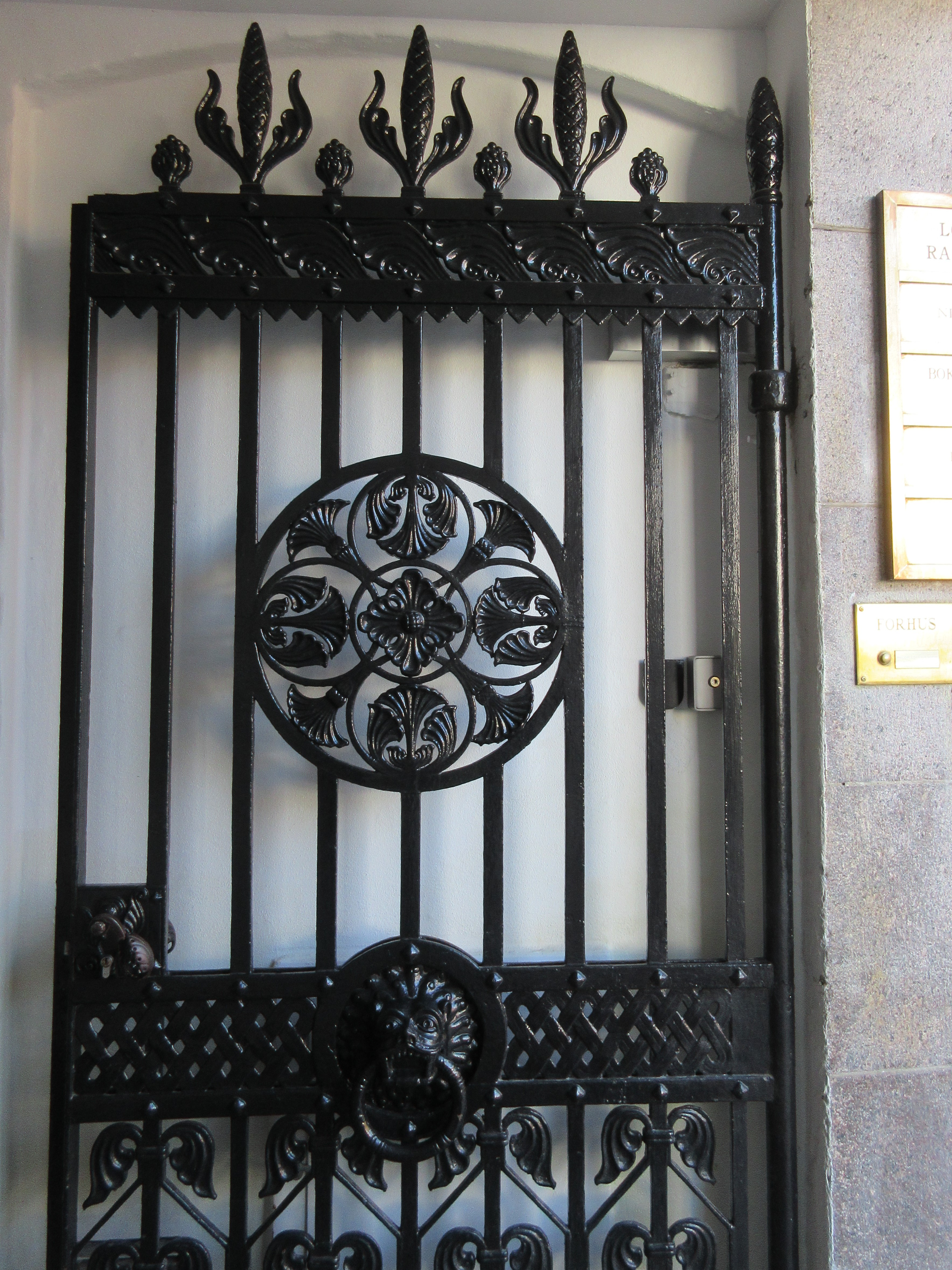
Detail of the gate at Lille Strandstræde 22

The firm has contributed to a number of buildings in Copenhagen, for instance decorative metalwork for Copenhagen City Hall, a gate at Amagertorv 6 and street lamps at the Church of the Holy Ghost.

The company was also a leading manufacturer of chandeliers and other fine decorative lighting fixtures.

== See also ==
- Hudevad Smithy
