= Hudevad Smithy =

Danish smithy and manufacturer, now museum

Coordinates: 55°18′54″N 10°32′29″E

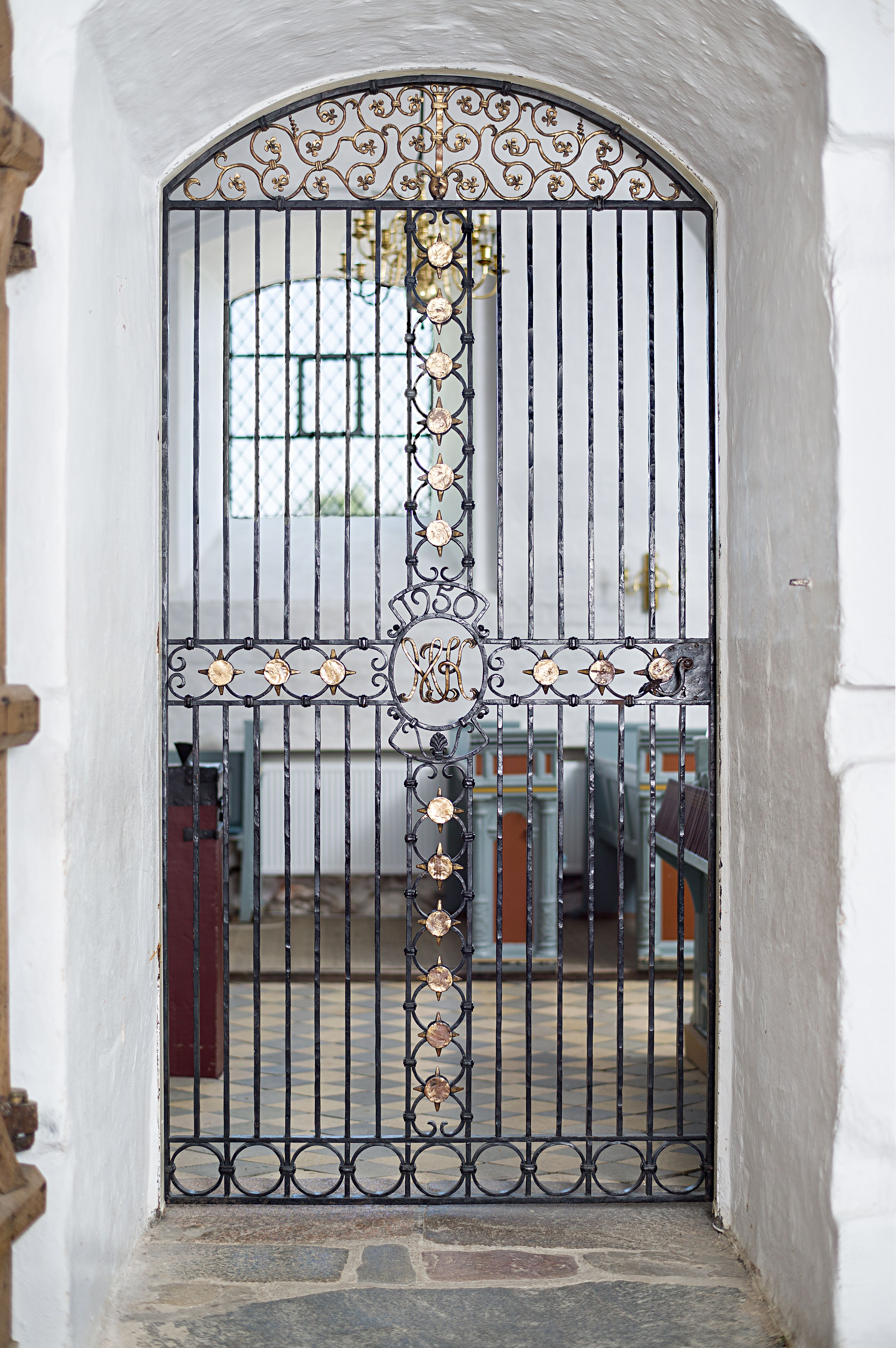
Door created by Hans Rasmussen in 1950, Munkeborg Church, Denmark

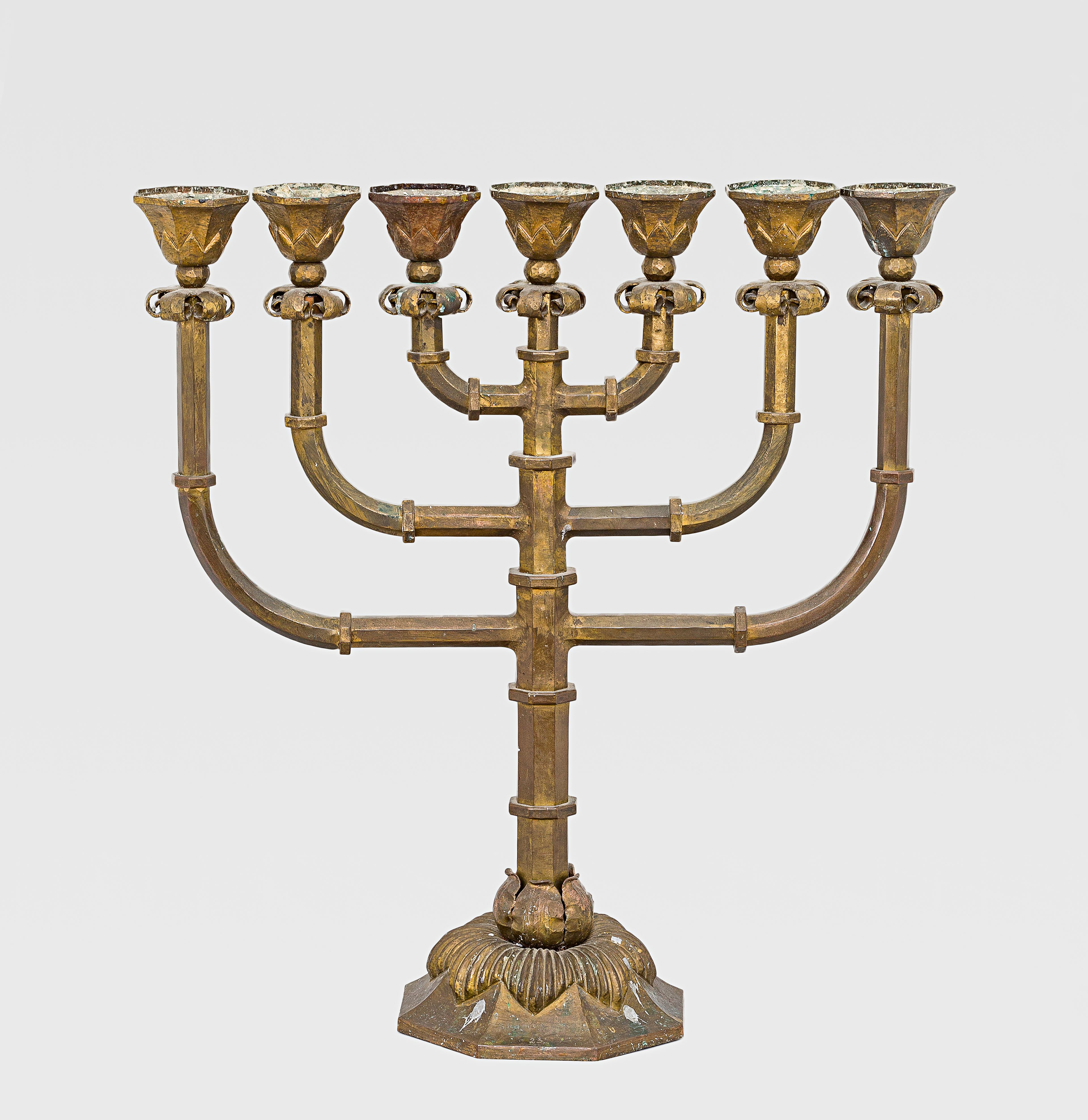
Candelabra created by Rasmussen in c. 1925, Skamby Church, Denmark

Hudevad Smithy (Danish: Hudevad Smedje), a traditional village smithy which was later expanded with a radiator factory and also developed into a prolific manufacturer of decorative metalwork for churches and other buildings, is now operated as a museum in Hudevad near Årup on the island of Funen, Denmark. The company was operated by four generations of smiths named Hans Rasmussen. The museum combines a working smithy with an exhibition about the transition from traditional craftsmanship to industry and an extensive collection of decorative objects created by Hans Rasmussen II (1883–1975). The museum opened in 2009.

== History ==
=== Origins ===
The village smithy in Hudevad was taken over by Hans Rasmussen I in the 1880s. In 1907, it relocated to a new building on the other side of the street. He collaborated with a workshop located in a neighboring building. Hans Rasmussen II (1882–1975) completed his apprenticeship as a carriage smith in 1902. He took over the smithy from his father in 1909.

=== Decorative metalwork ===
Hans Rasmussen II had artistic interests. From 1913 to 1918, he spent one month every winter at architect Jens Møller Jensen's decorative arts school in Copenhagen. Møller Jensen would later charge him with the execution of the Reunification Well which was inaugurated at Odense's Grand Hotel in 1920 (now in the Reunification Museum in Christiansfeld). This earned Rasmussen a nationwide reputation. He later received numerous commissions for metal furnishings and other decorative metalwork for churches, manor houses and other buildings across the country.

=== Industrial development ===
In the late early 1930, Rasmussen started a production of central heating systems for local farms and manor houses. A new factory was therefore inaugurated on an adjacent site in 1931. In 1039, he started the production of PLAN radiators on a Norwegian license. The factory was expanded several times in the 1960s and 1970s. The company was eventually continued by his son and grandson. In the 1970s, Hudevad Radiatorfabrik manufactured up to 1,000 radiators a day.

In 2005, Hudebad Radiatorfabrik was acquired by Ribe Jernindustry and moved to Ribe. Ribe Jernindustri closed in 2016. In 2018, Hudevad was acquired by British company Stelrad Radiator Group, Hudevad Radiator Design is now based in Kolding.

== See also ==
- F. W. Doberck & søn
