= Dannemare Church =

Coordinates: 54°45′42″N 11°11′19″E

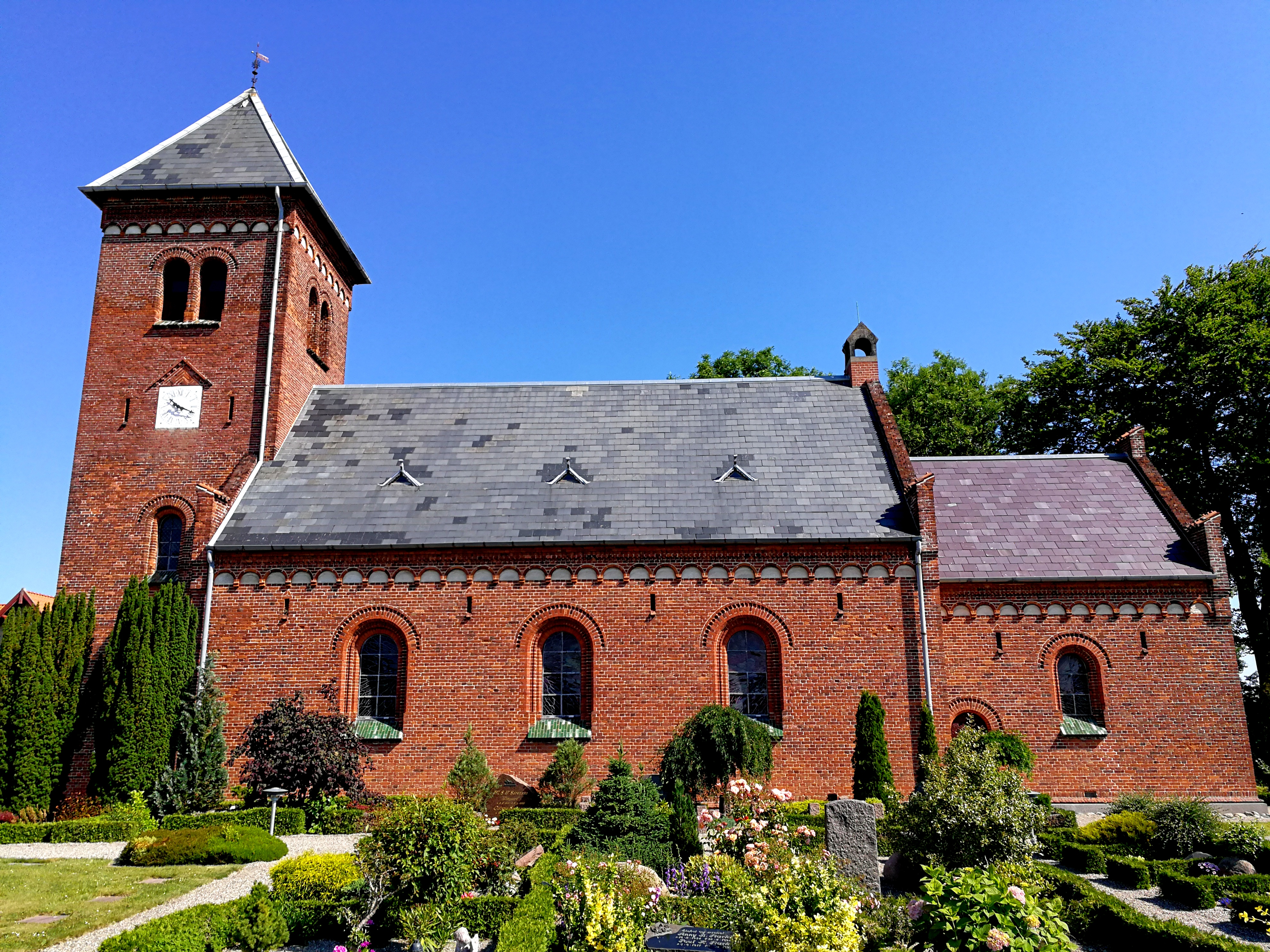
Dannemare Church in 2020

Dannemare Church is a Neo-Romanesque church in the village of Dannemare, some 12 km (7.5 mi) south of Nakskov on the Danish island of Lolland. Built in 1897, it replaced the earlier Romanesque church which burnt down in 1897.

== History ==
The former Romanesque church from c. 1200 was one of Lolland's oldest brick-built churches. It was owned by the Crown after the Reformation but in 1698 was transferred to the Bådesgård estate which was later owned by Princess Charlotte Amalie. After her death, it was transferred to the State in 1784 until it came into the ownership of local farmers. In 1913, the church gained its independence.

The former building was seriously damaged by a fire on 5 April 1895 which broke out in the rectory west of the church. Large sections of the church were relatively unscathed but, despite ministerial recommendations that the surviving elements should be taken into account in the rebuilding, the old structure was demolished on the grounds that a larger building was needed. The new structure, designed by the architect Aage Langeland-Mathiesen (1868–1933), was completed in 1897.

== Architecture ==
The former red-brick building had consisted of a Romanesque chancel and nave and a Gothic porch. Today's church consists of a chancel, a nave and a tower whose ground floor serves as a porch. Renovation work was undertaken in 1978. On that occasion, the windows were replaced with stained-glass designs by Mogens Jærgensen.

== Interior ==
Several artifacts were saved from the former church and can now be seen in the new building. The altarpiece in the auricular style from the Baroque period was completed around 1640. At the centre, there is a copy of Carl Bloch's painting of Christ's Resurrection. The font from c. 1650 has a hexagonal bowl and is decorated in the Rococo style. In 1976, it was painted blue, representing baptismal water and the joy of baptism. Also of note is the church clock which originally stood in Jægersborg Mansion. It was designed by Poul Petersen in 1771 and restored in 1897 by Bertram Larsen.

== See also ==
- List of churches on Lolland
