= Store Strandstræde =

Street in Copenhagen, Denmark

Coordinates: 55.6812°N 12.5890°E

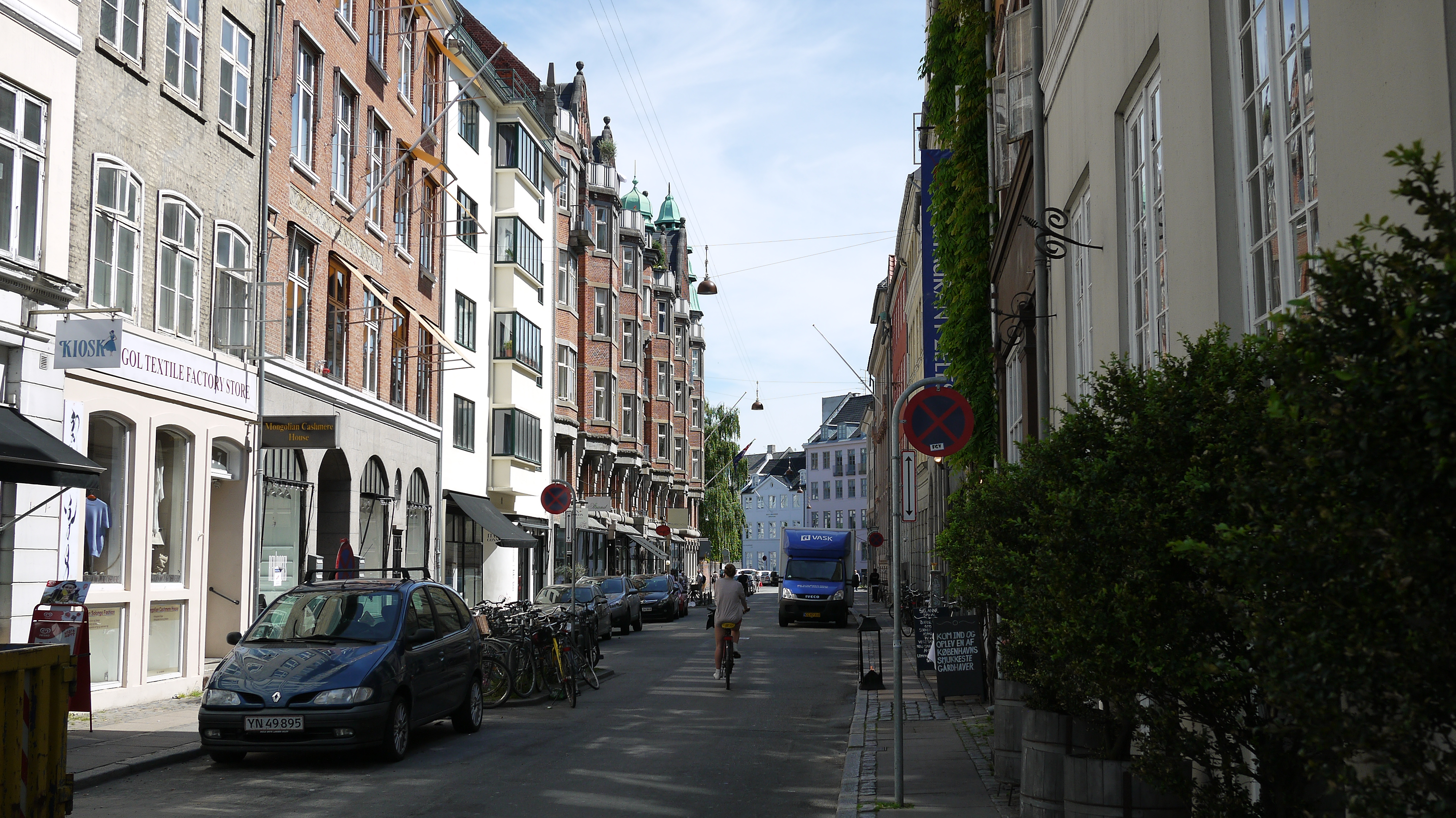
Store Strandstræde

Store Strandstræde (literally "Great Beach Alley") is a street in Copenhagen, Denmark. It extends diagonally from Kongens Nytorv, at the corner of Nyhavn and Bredgade, to Sankt Annæ Plads. Lille Strandstræde ("Small Beach Alley") joins the street shortly before reaching Sankt Annæ Plads.

Nordic Council is headquartered at No. 18 and operates an art gallery featuring Nordic art and artists at the ground floor.

== History ==
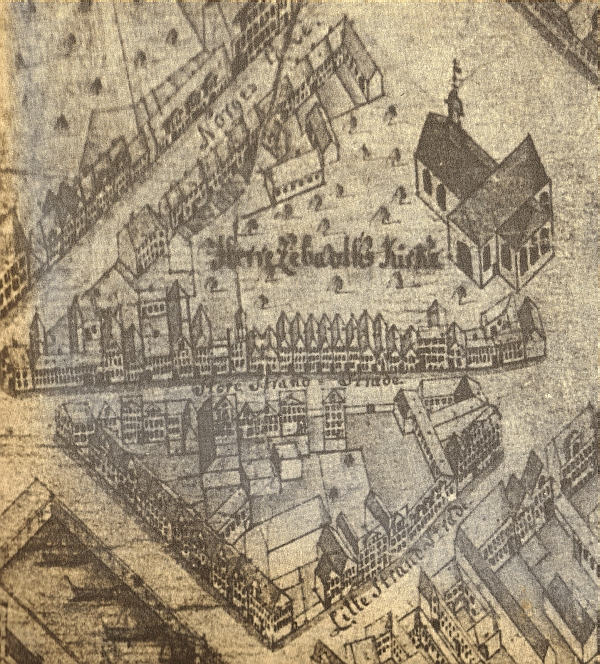
Store Strandstræde

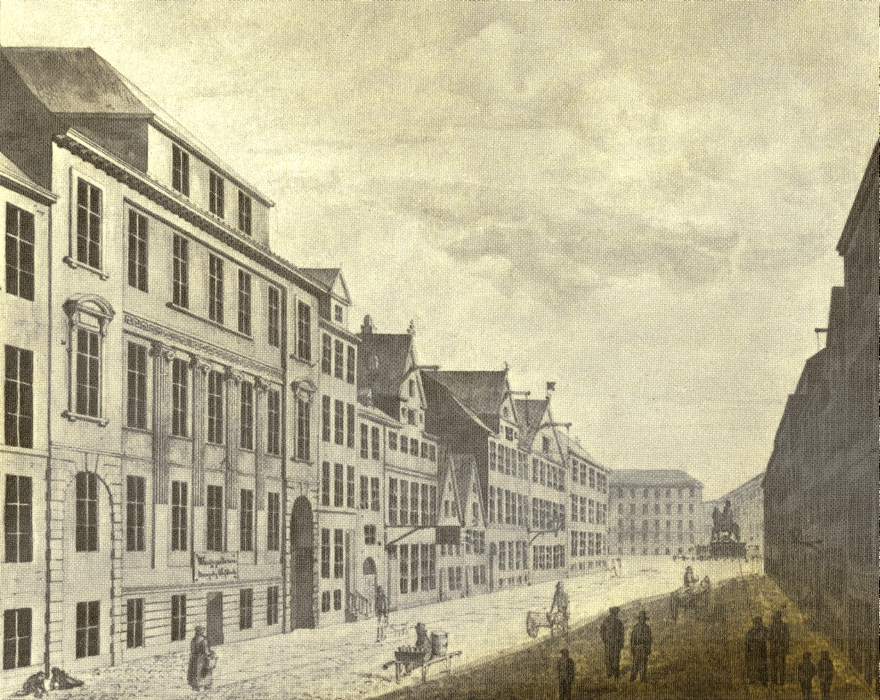
Store Strandstræde in c. 1830

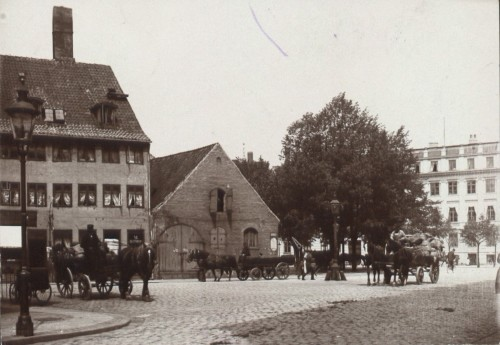
Store Strandstræde in the 1900s3

Store Strandgade is the last remains of a small road which ran along the coast line, connecting the old Eastern City Gate to Sankt Annæ Bro (English: Saint Ann's Bridge) where the Custom House was built in 1628. The shore was originally located where the street now meets Sankt Annæ Plads.

The far end of the street was widened in the 1910.

== Buildings ==
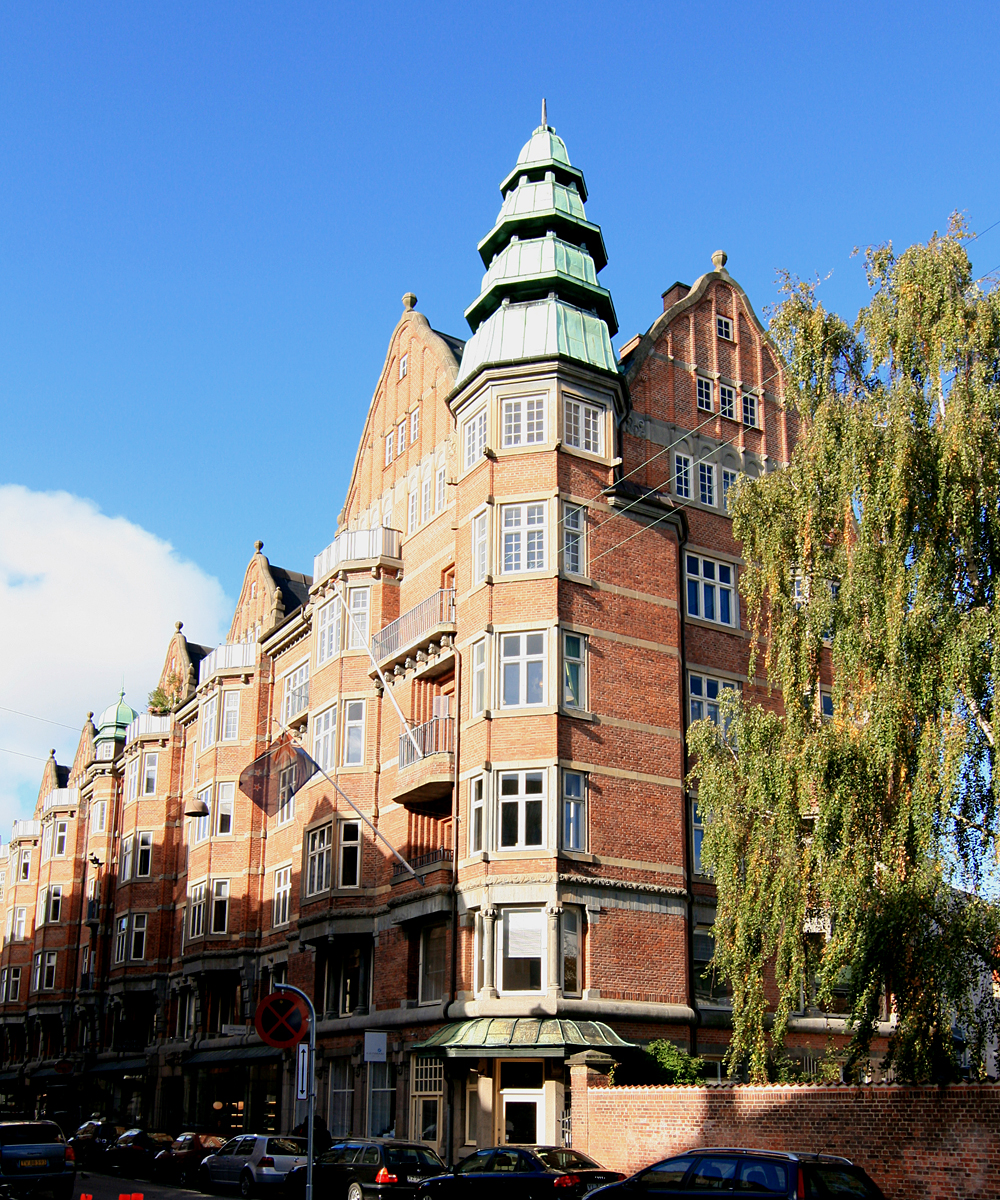
Store Strandstræde 19–21, designed by Aage Langeland-Mathiesen (1908)

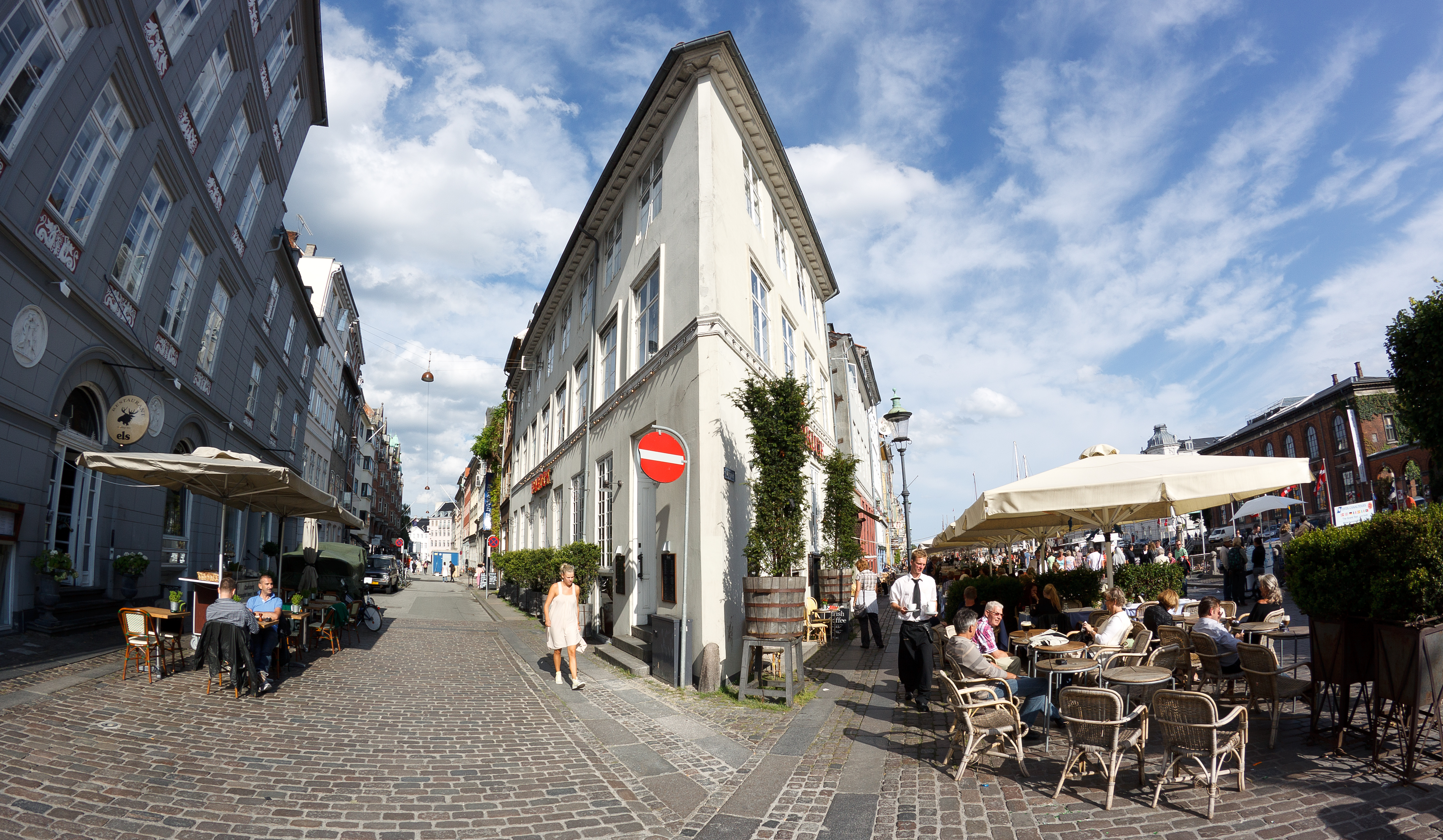
The corner of Store Strandstræde (left) and Nyhavn (right)

The Grandjean House at Storestrandgade 3-Bredgade 4 was built in 1853–54 to a design which is typical of many of the late Empire houses in central Copenhagen. The main facade of the house faced Store Strandstræde while a long wall shielded a courtyard from Bredgade.

The Waagepetersensk House (No. 18), with its facade decorated with Ionic order pilasters, is from 1793 and was designed by Johan Martin.

No. 19-21 dates from 1908 and was designed by Aage Langeland-Mathiesen. The building was listed in 1999.

The low building whose gable faces the street close to Sankt Annæ Plads is a hearse deport associated with the next-door Garrison Church.

== Public art ==
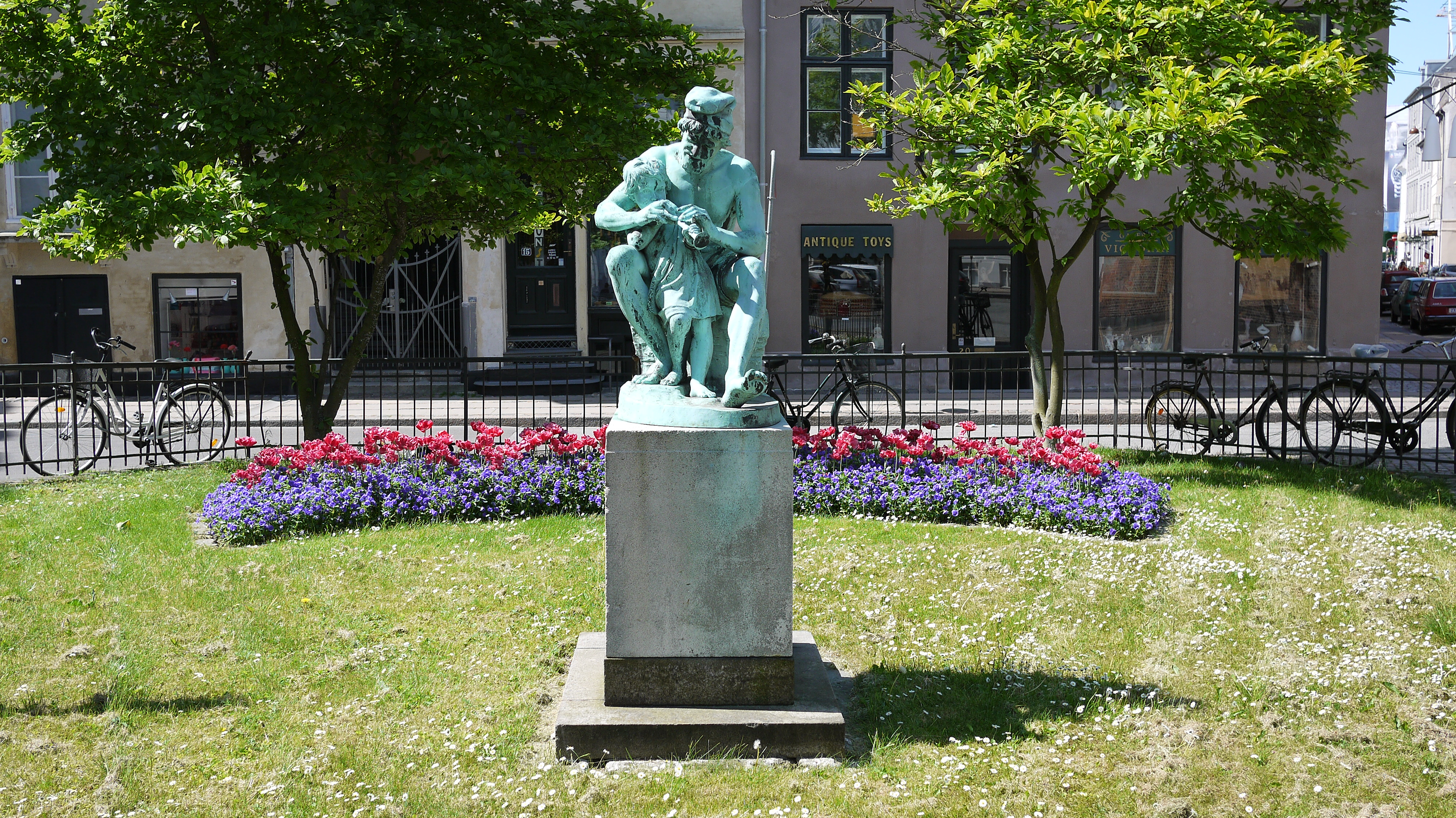
The statue

On the pointed corner of Store Strandstræde with Lille Strandstræde is a small green space with a statue, depicting a Napolitan A Fisherman teaching his Son to pla the Flute. The statue is designed by Otto Evens and is from 1859.

== See also ==
- Kongens Nytorv
- F. W. Doberck & søn
- Source
- Number of residentsby census
