= Bertram Larsen =

Danish clock manufacturer

Bertram Larsen was a leading Danish manufacturer of tower clocks. The firm created a vast number of tower clocks and Carillons for Danish churches, castles and manor houses, town halls, railway stations, and other landmark buildings. It was also responsible for the restoration of a significant number of historic clocks, including Lund astronomical clock in Lund Cathedral in 1909–1923.

== History ==
=== Early history, 1827–1880 ===
The firm was founded in 1827 by Gustav Zettervall in Sorø. He later moved the operations first to Ringsted and then to Køge. From 1847, the firm was taken over by his foster son, Bertram Larsen (1823–1877). After Bertram’s death in 1877, his widow, Juliane Emilie Thygesen (1820–1901), continued running it with their son Julius managing the operations.

=== Julius Bertram Larsen, 1880–1935 ===
Julius Bertram Larsen (1854–1935) moved the firm to Copenhagen when his mother ceded the ownership of it in 1880.

=== Fridtjof Bertram-Larsen, 1935–1970s ===
After the death of Julius Bertram Larsen in 1935, the business was run by his son, Fridtjof Bertram-Larsen (1891–1980). His works include the carillons at Odense Cathedral, Ribe Cathedral and Church of Our Saviour. The firm closed in the 1970s.

== Selected works ==
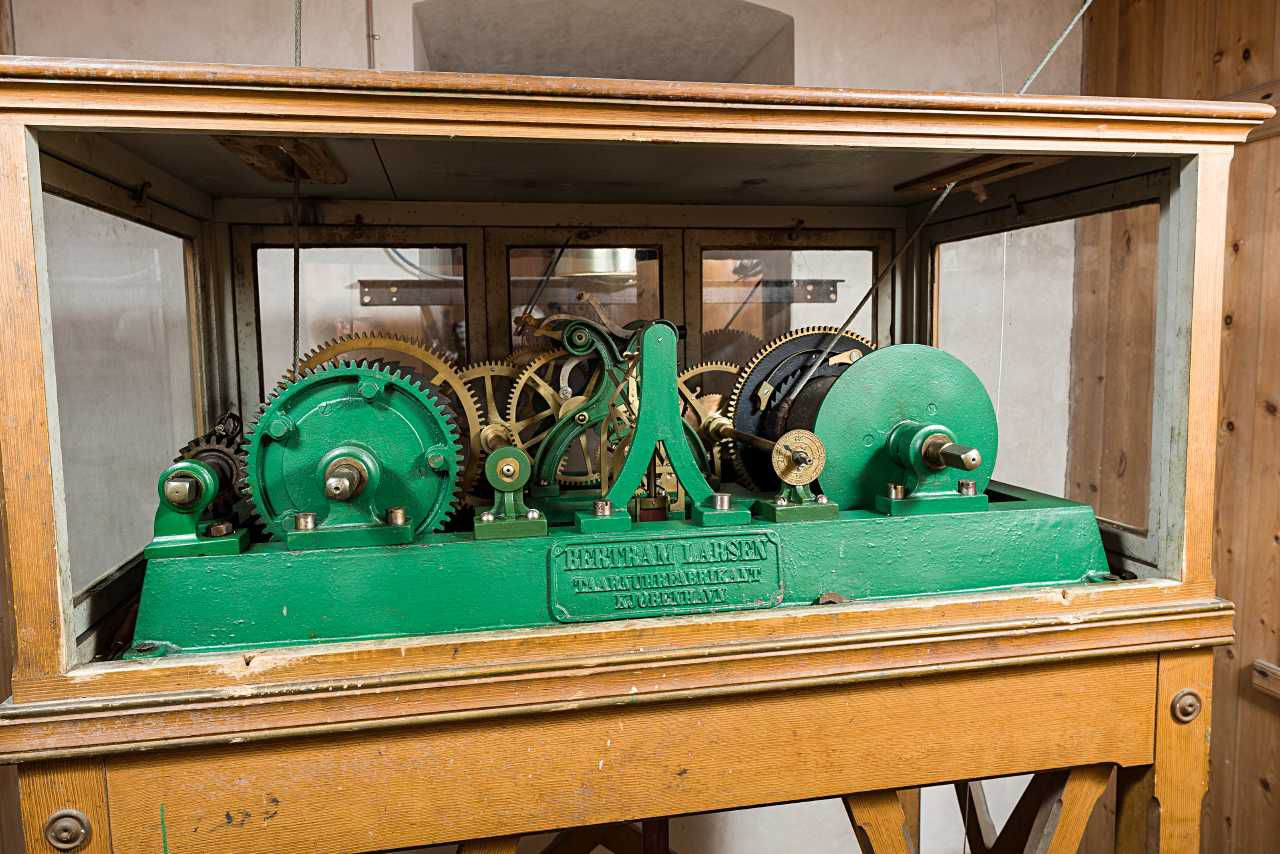
Ærøskøbing Church, Ærøskøbing (1885)

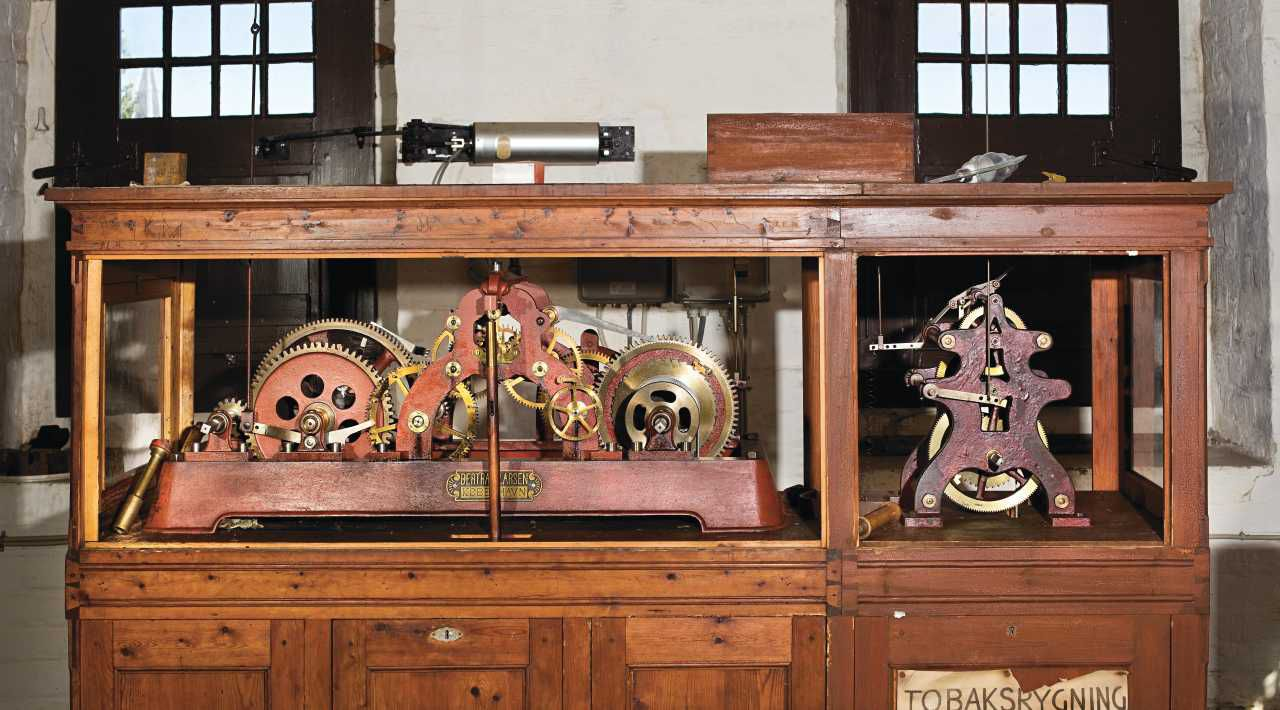
St. Nicolas' Church, Svendborg (1894)

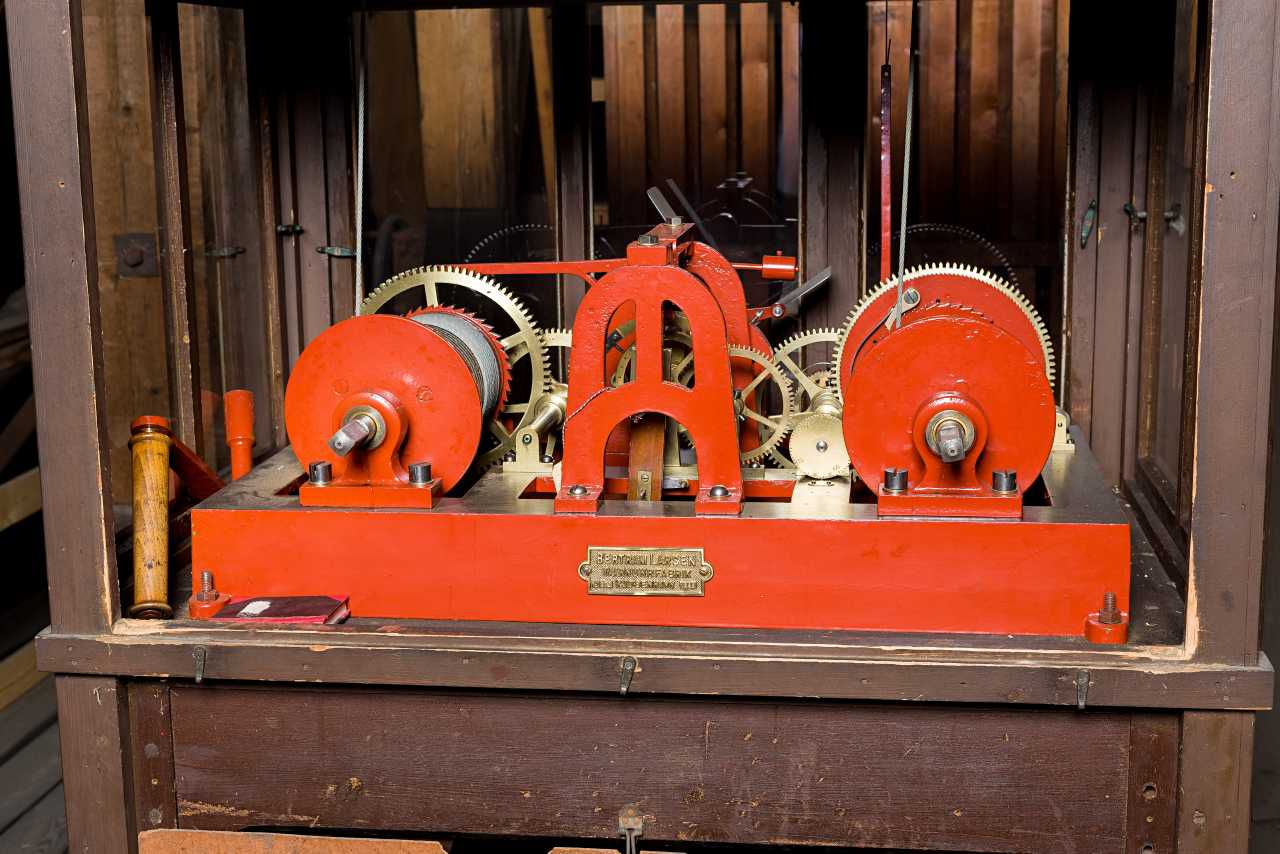
Emmaus Church, Copenhagen (1895)

=== Tower clocks ===
- Frederiksholms Kanal 18, Copenhagen (1870s)
- Herrested Church, Herrested (1880)
- Church of Our Lady, Svendborg (1884)
- Ærøskøbing Church, Ærøskøbing (1885)
- Svendborg Town Hall, Svendborg
- Jesus Church, Copenhagen (1891/1895)
- Dipylon, Dipylon, Copenhagen (1892)
- St. Nicolas' Church, Svendborg (1894)
- Emmaus Church, Copenhagen (1895)
- Frederiksborg Castle, Hollerød (1895)
- Holy Cross Church, Copenhagen (1895)
- Kongegården, Korsør (1901)
- Kastelskirken, Copenhagen (1895)
- Aarhus Cathedral, Aarhus (1907)
- Meilgaard, Djursland (1921)
- Torbenfeldt, Holbæk Municipality (1921)
- Hobro Tinghus, Hobro (1922)
- Amalienborg Palace, Copenhagen
- Slaglille Church, Slaglille (No. 806, 1908)
- St. Canute's Cathedral, Odense
- Copenhagen Cathedral, Copenhagen
- Gutenberghus, Copenhagen
- Gammel Holtegård, Rudersdal Municipality, Denmark
- Søllerød Town Hall, Rudersdal Municipality (1943)

Restored tower clocks

- Ledreborg, Lejre (1875)
- Dragør Church, Dragør (1882–1885)
- St. Peter's Church, Copenhagen (1900s)
- Reformed Church (1916/1918/1933)
- Dannemare Church, Lolland, Denmark (1887)
- Lund astronomical clock, Lund Cathedral, Lund, Sweden (1909–23)
- Roskilde Cathedral, Roskilde (1931)
- Isaak Habrecht's astronomical clock in Rosenborg Castle, Copenhagen
- Tower clock of Church of Our Saviour, Copenhagen
- Planetarium of the Round Tower, Copenhagen
- St. Nicolas' Church, Køge
- St, Nicolas' Church, Copenhagen
- Regensen, Copenhagen

=== Carillon s ===
- Frederiksborg Chapel, Hillerød (1886)

Restored carillons

- Carillon of Ledreborg, Lejre

== See also ==
- Henrik Kyhl
