= Aage Langeland-Mathiesen =

Danish architect

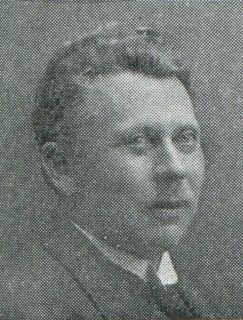
- Born: 22 May 1868; Aarhus, Denmark
- Died: 19 June 1933 (aged 65); Liseleje, Denmark
- Education: Royal Danish Academy of Fine Arts
- Occupation: Architect
- Awards: Pritzker Prize

Aage Langeland-Mathiesen (22 May 1868 – 19 June 1933) was a Danish architect. He was active both in building design and restoration, and was associated with the National Museum for many years. His building designs are strongly influenced by his interest in historic architecture. He collaborated with his more well-known colleague Ulrik Plesner on many projects.

== Early life and education ==
Mathiesen was born in Aarhus but the family moved to Copenhagen in 1872 where his father Rasmus Langeland Mathiesen became building inspector of the Danish capital. Aage Langeland-Mathiesen completed a carpenter's apprenticeship and studied at Copenhagen Technical College before enrolling at the Royal Danish Academy of Fine Arts in 1884. He became an executing architect at Hermann Baagøe Storck prior to his graduation in January 1895. In 1897, he won the Neuhausen Prize for a model of Copenhagen's third city hall and received the academy's travel grant.

== Career ==
He worked for Valdemar Koch from 1894 to 1898 on the measurement of Danish medieval churches and was later associated with the National Museum for fifteen years.

He was represented at the Charlottenborg Spring Exhibition in 1897–1903 and at the 18 November Exhibition in 1927 and 1930.

== Style ==
Langeland-Mathiesen's style was strongly influenced by his interest in historic architecture. He found inspiration in Renaissance and Baroque architecture, combining it with modern techniques and craftsmanship. Other works, such as Glacisgården, was in Jugendstil.

The work he created in collaboration with Ulrik Plesner are characterized by a more consistent style influenced by the Bedre Byggeskik movement, Baroque and Romantic Nationalism.

== Other pursuits ==
He was vice president of the Danish Motor Vehicle Owners' Association (FDM) and chairman of the Glacisgaarden Motorcycle Club. He was also archivist for the Royal Copenhagen Shooting Society. He worked on a book about the Royal Shooting Society which was published posthumously. He is buried at Frederiksberg Old Cemetery.

== Selected works ==
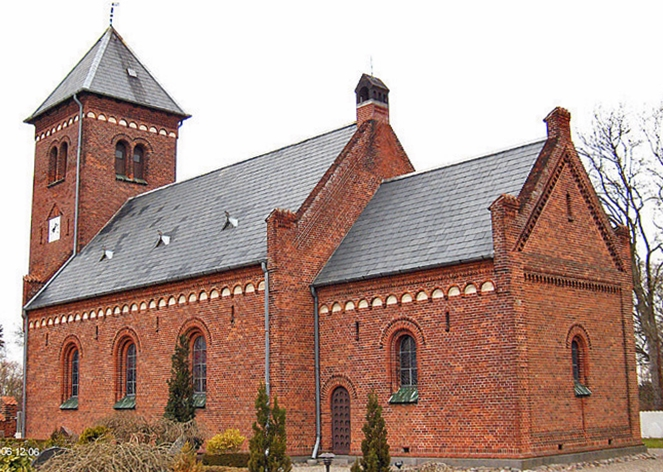
Dannemare Church, Dannemare

- Gammel Torv 2/Nygade 6, Copenhagen (1898)
- Nørregade 6/Dyrkøb (adaption), Copenhagen (1900)
- Blågårds Plads 2–6 and 8–12, Copenhagen (1902)
- Skt. Jørgensborg, Trommesalen 5-7/Gammel Kongevej 1, Copenhagen (1902–03)
- Absalonsgade 28 (rear building), Copenhagen (1903)
- Brøndsteds Allé 5-7/Halls Allé (1903)
- Glacisgaarden, Østbanegade 11/Trondhjems Plads, Copenhagen (1903–04, fredet)
- Abel Cathrines Gade 18/Istedgade 19/Lille Istedgade 1, Copenhagen (1906)
- Frederiksholms Kanal 2/Vandkunsten 1, København (1906)
- Dannemare Church, Dannemare, Lolland (1907)
- Doctor's House, Loka, Västmanland, Sweden (1907)
- Store Strandstræde 19-21, Copenhagen (1907–08, listed)
- Apotek, Havnegade 9, Frederikssund (1908, now retail store)
- Frederiksborggade 18/Nørre Voldgade 19, Copenhagen (1912, later adapted again)
- Sparekassen for Præstø By og Omegn, Adelgade 91, Præstø (1912)
- Villa Ørehøj, Helsingør
- Laboratorium Ellehammer, Kildegårdsvej 18–20, Hellerup (1919–20, totalt ombygget 2008)

=== In collaboration with Ulrik Plesner ===
- Vodroffslund, Vodroffsvej 37-43/Danas Plads 11–13 og 10-20/Carl Plougs Vej 8/Vodroffslund 1–3, Frederiksbergm Copenhagen (1906–09)
- Vodroffshus, Svend Trøsts Vej 12/Danas Plads 24/Carl Plougs Vej 7, Frederiksberg, Copenhagen (1908, decorative works by Thorvald Bindesbøll)
- Studenterforeningen, H. C. Andersens Boulevard 6, Copenhagen (1909, rebuilt)
- Ringkøbing Kommuneskole, Ringkøbing (1910, later expanded)
- Kvindelig Læseforening, Gammel Mønt 1 (1910, now part of the Berlingske complex)
- Apartment building, Enghavevej/Sønder Boulevard, Copenhagen (1917)
- Ingerslevsgade, Copenhagen (1918)
- Ingerslevsgade, Sigerstedgade, Søndre Boulevard (1919)
- Smyrnavej 9–13, Grækenlandsvej 40–46, Copenhagen (1922)

== Image gallery ==
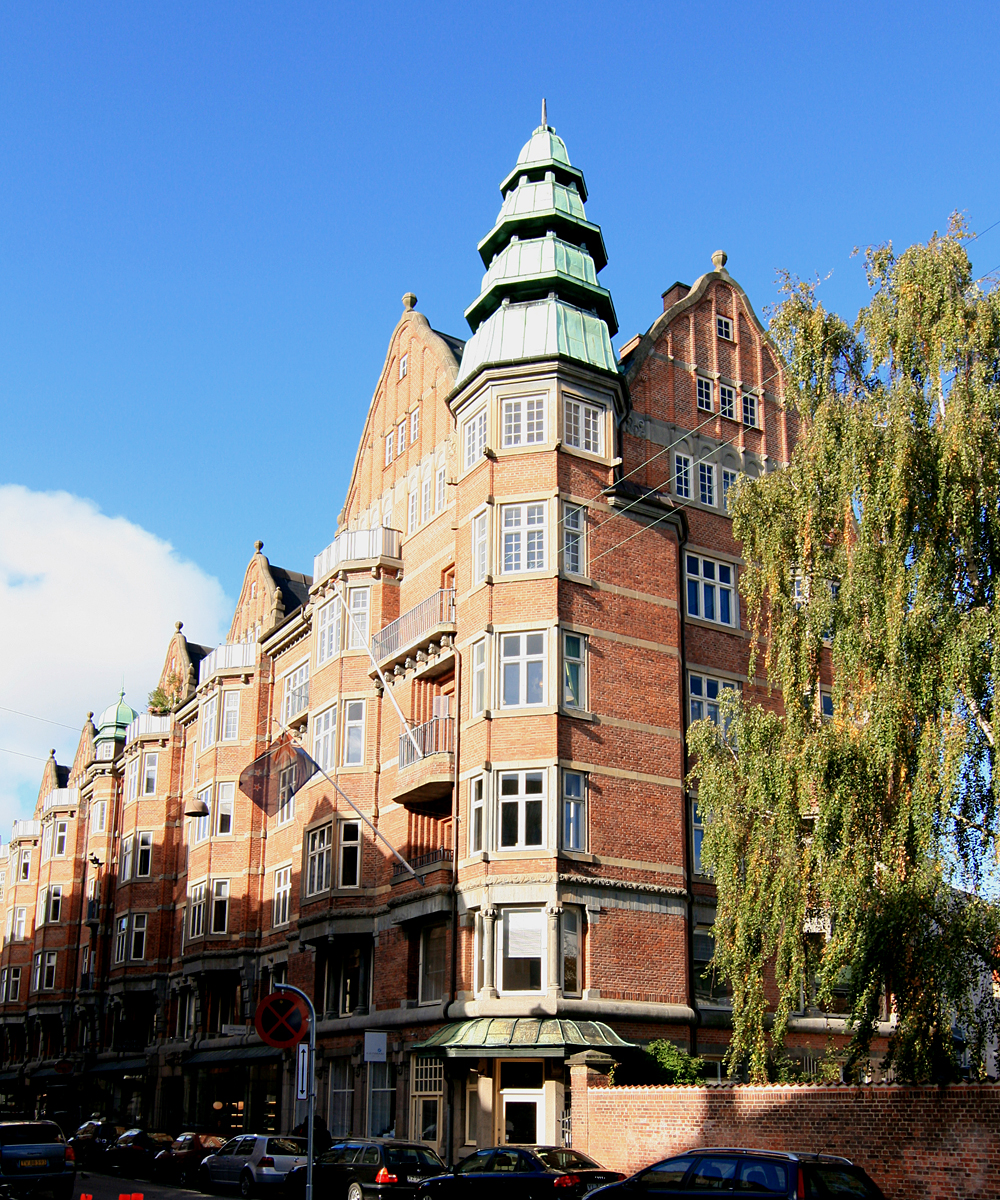
Store Strand Stræde 18–2

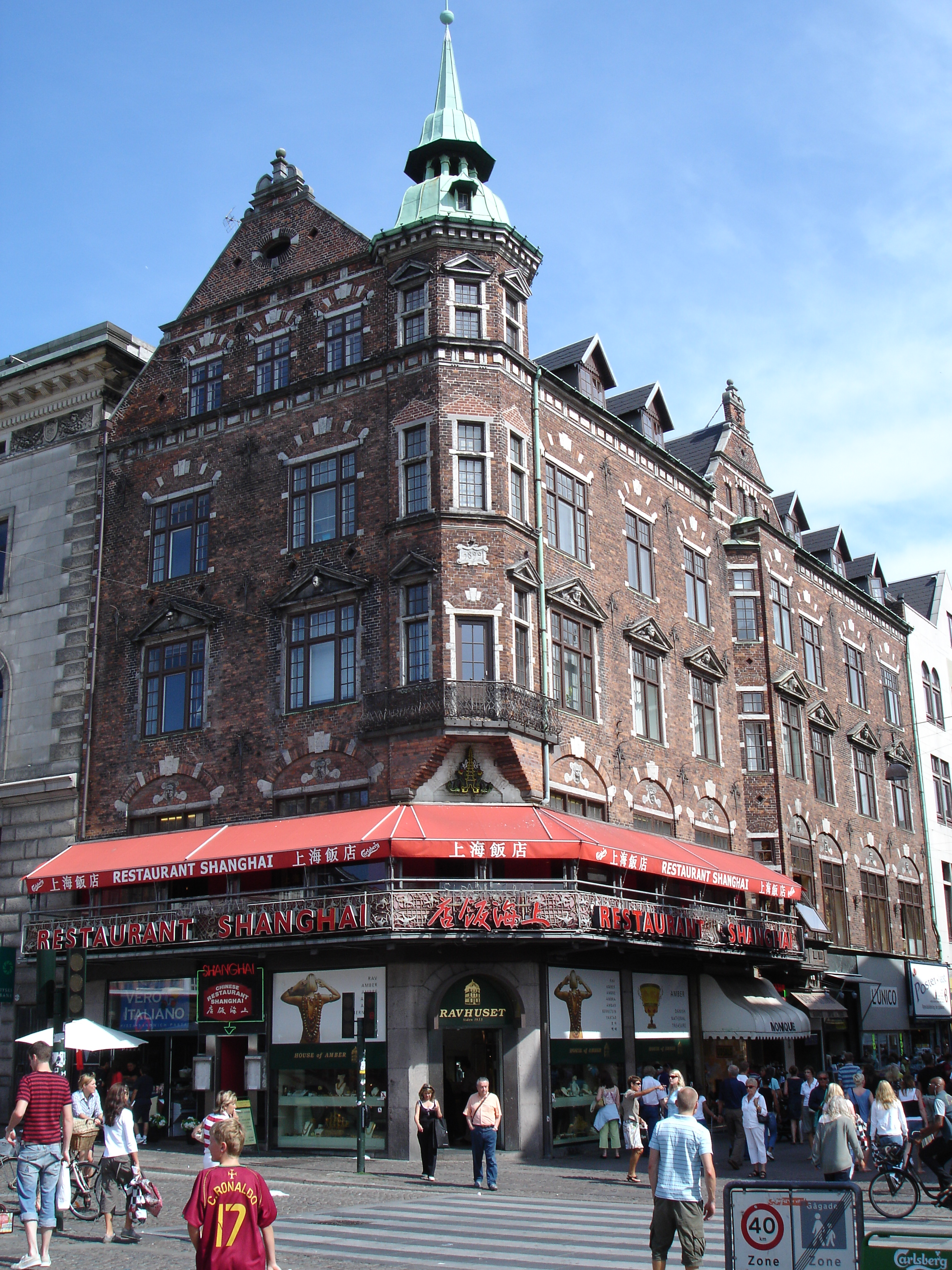
Gammel Torv 2

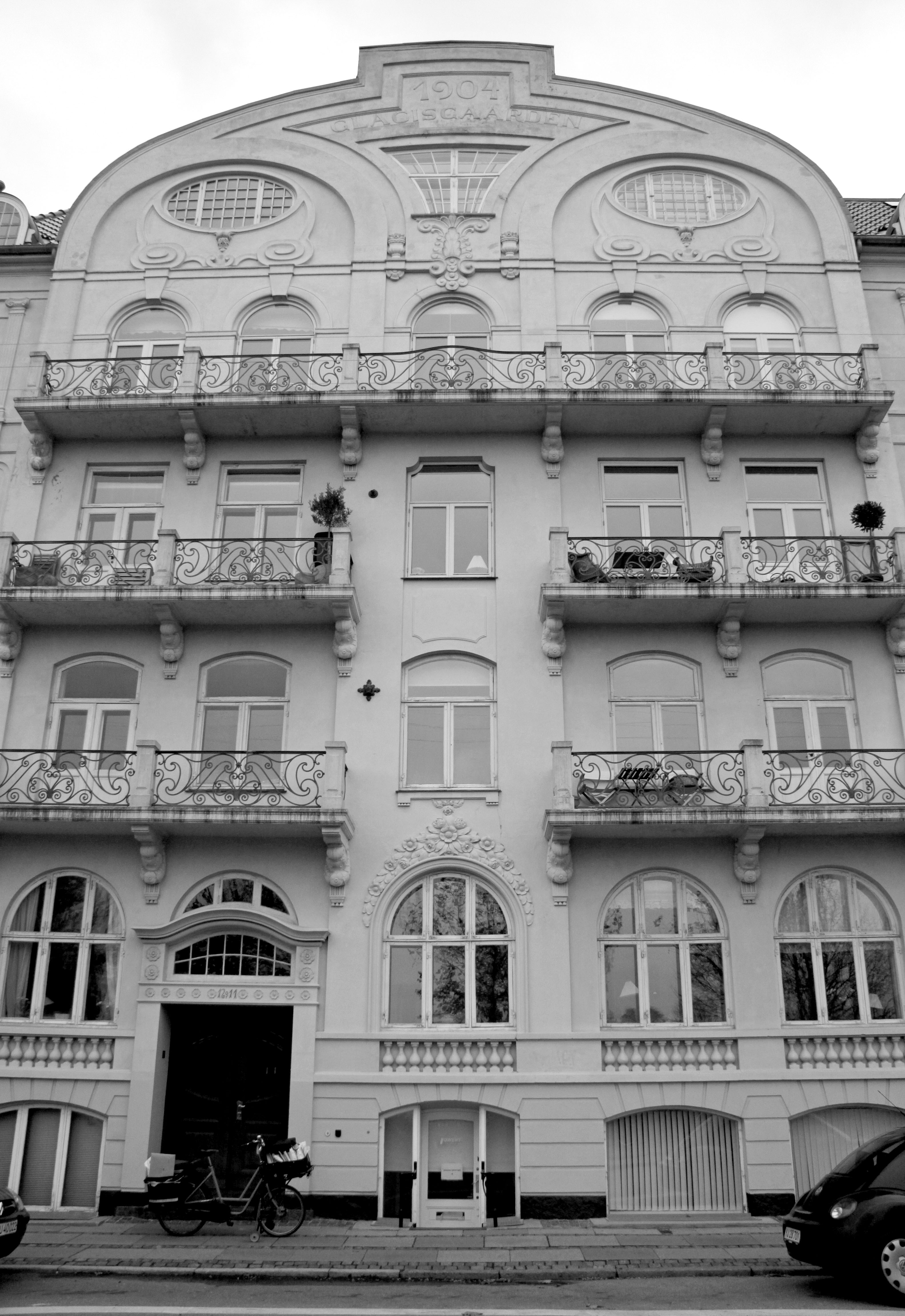
Østbanegade
