= Store Strandstræde 19–21 =

Building in Copenhagen, Denmark

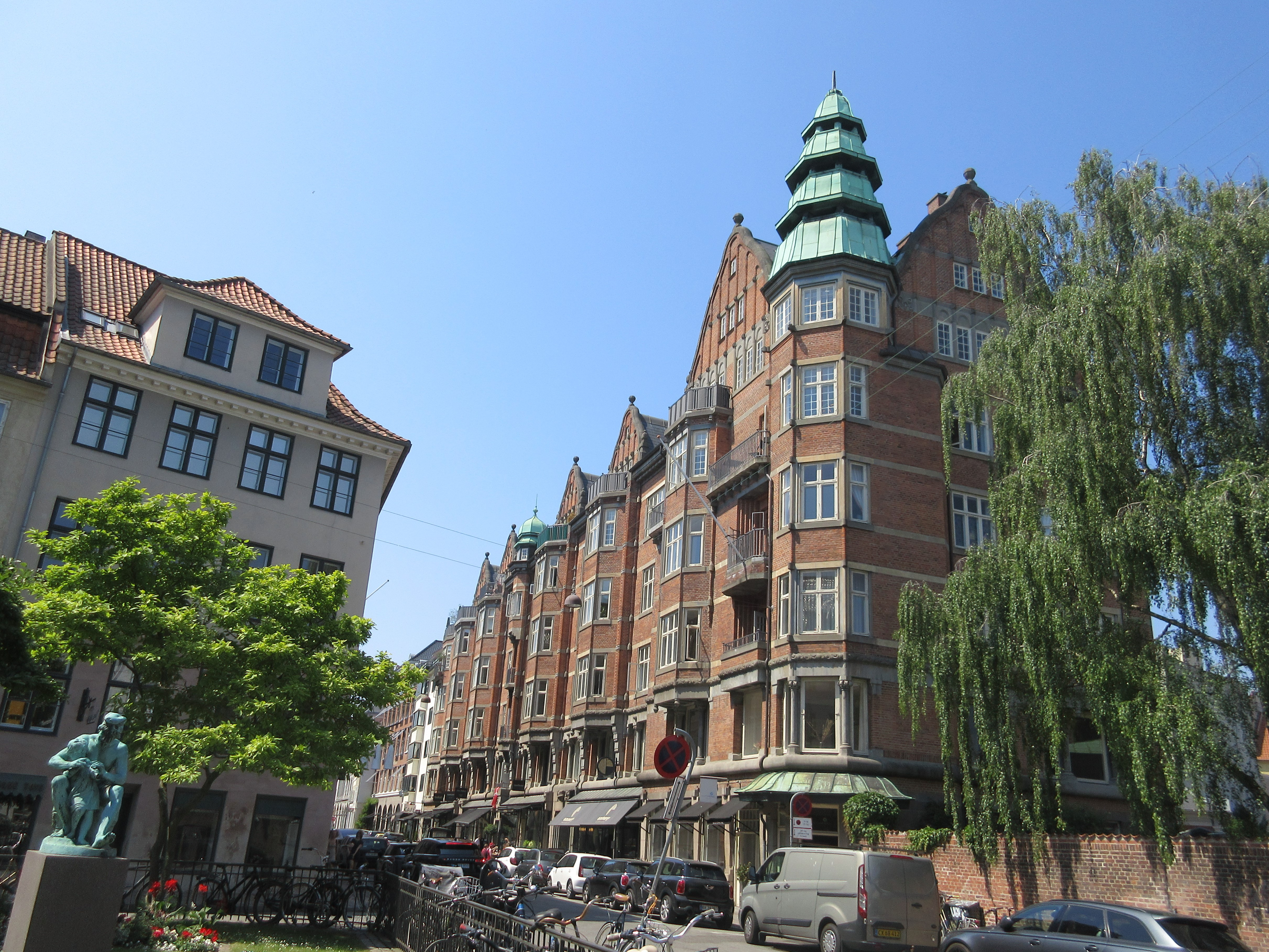
- T:Store Strandstræde 19–21 in 2021
- Interactive map of the Store Strandstræde 19–21 area

General information
- Location: Copenhagen, Denmark
- Coordinates: 55°40′52.87″N 12°35′21.62″E
- Completed: 1908

Design and construction
- Architect: Aage Langeland-Mathiesen

Store Strandstræde 19–21 is a listed mixed-use property from 1908 in Store Strandstræde in central Copenhagen, Denmark. The complex contains commercial space in the two lower floors and large, high-end apartments on the three upper floors and also comprises a workshop building in the courtyard. It is designed in a style which combines Romantic Nationalism with influences from Jugendstil. It is located next to the Garrison Church.

== History ==
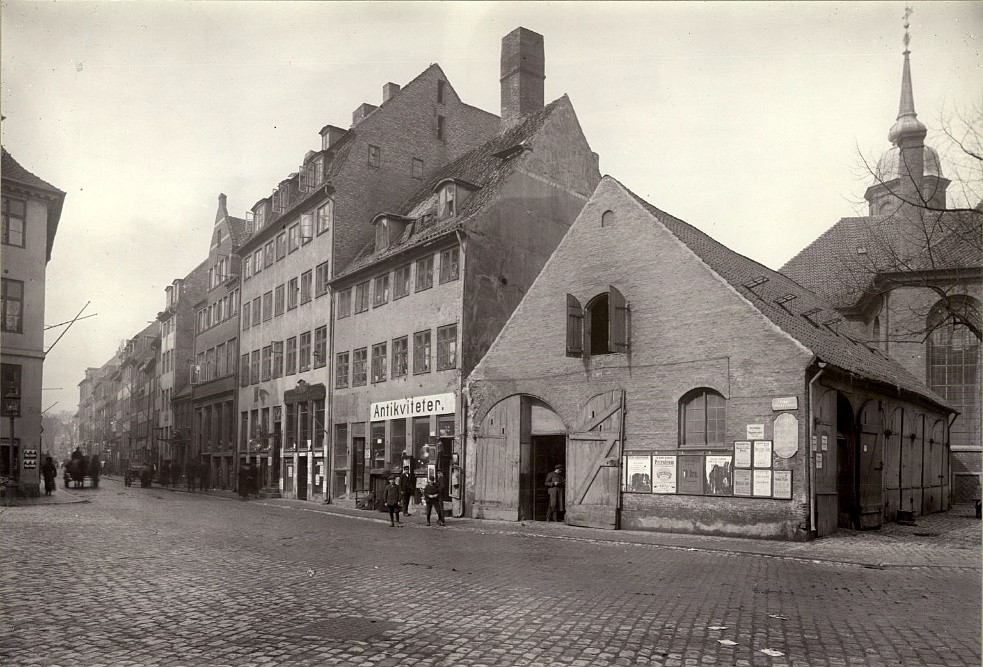
The site before the street was expanded

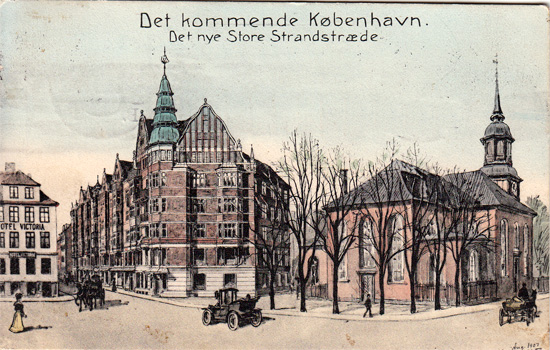
The new building seen on a postcard by Janus Laurentius Ridter

Store Strandstræde 19–21 was built by the consortium "Hallandshus" in connection with an expansion of part of Store Strandstræde at no cost for the city. The expansion of the street to a width of 20 Danish alls was adopted by the city council in 1906. The project was part of a transformation of the old fortified city from "city" to "city centre", a development which was a result of the decommissioning of the city's old fortifications and involved the replacement of old residential buildings with modern commercial properties. It began with Det Københavnske Byggeselskab's construction of Ny Østergade in 1873-76 and was followed by the expansion of Christen Bernikowsstræde, Nygade and Farvergade, and the creation of the Christian IX's Gade neighbourhood. This transformation peaked in 1894–1915.

The new building in Store Strandstræde was designed by Aage Langeland-Mathiesen. Construction began in 1907 and was completed in 1908.

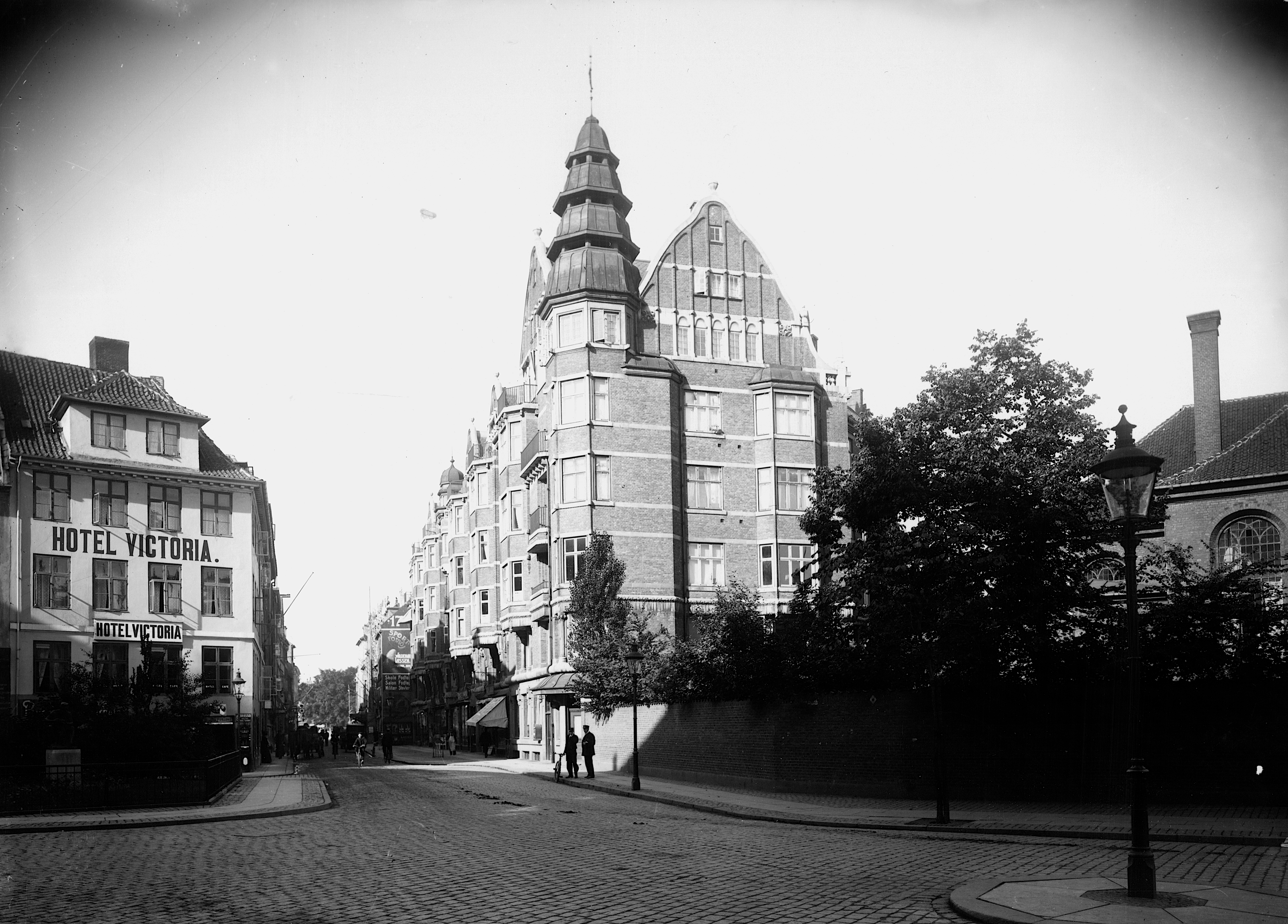
The building in 1017

The painter, illustrator and writer Louis Moe (1857-1945) lived at No. 21 from 1908 to 1921. The building was listed by the Danish Heritage Agency in the Danish national registry of protected buildings in 1999.

== Architecture ==
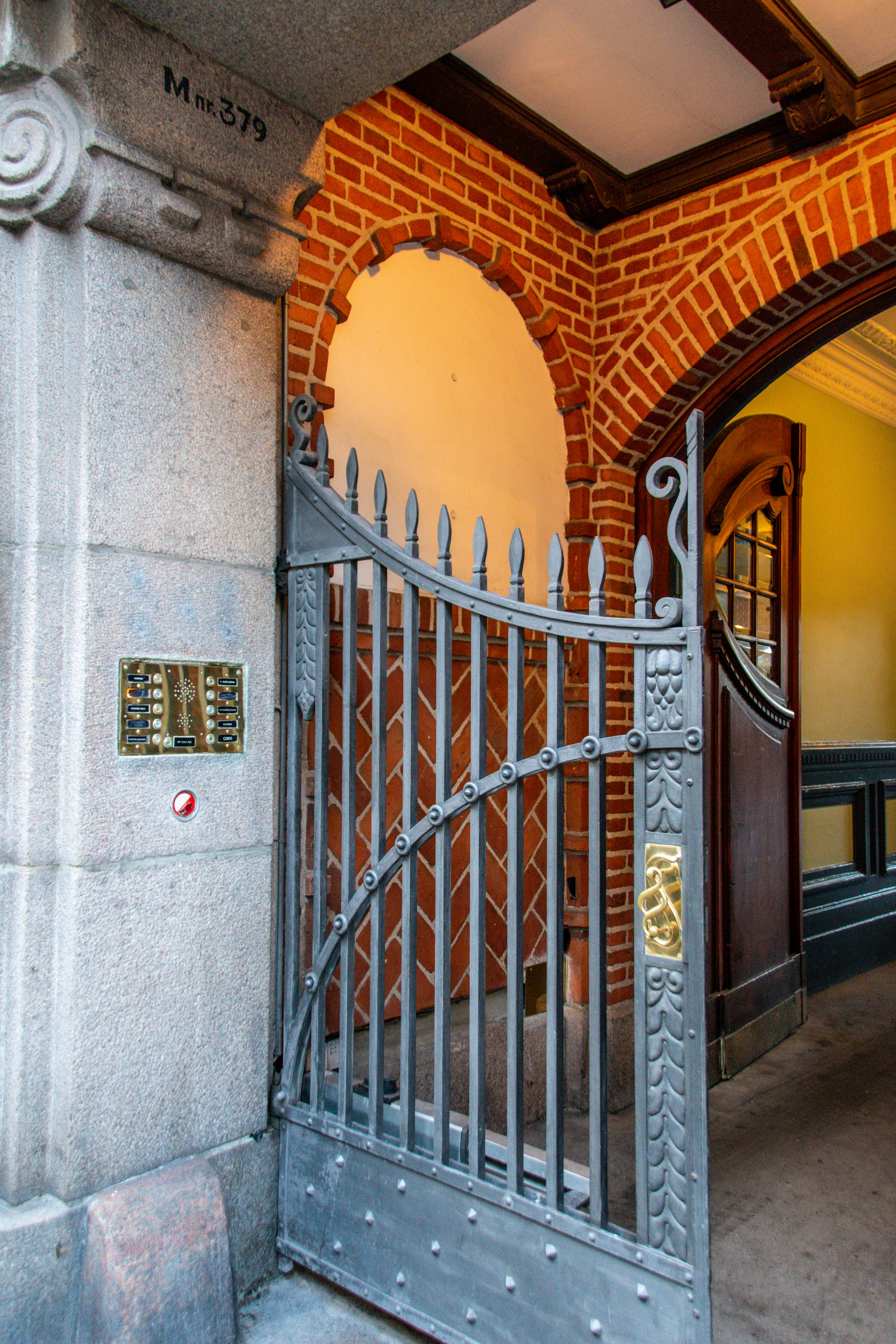
One of the two gates

The property consists of two adjoining buildings (No. 19 and No. 21) fronting the street, four side wings projecting from their rear side and a workshop building attached to the southernmost side wing. The buildings cover three-fourths of the lot which was the maximum permitted for residential development in the Old Town under the Building Act of 1899. There are basements under the two courtyards, a common feature of developments from about 1900 in the old part of the city.

The five-storey complex contains commercial space in the two lower floors (including retail space in the ground floor facing the street), apartments on the three upper floors and a six-storey workshop building (værkstedsbygning) attached to the southernmost side wing.

The buildings stand in blank, red brick with imitated sandstone details, a combination known from Christian IV's many Renaissance landmarks and is in Denmark known as Rosenborg Style after Rosenborg Castle. Gateways, doors and windows on the two lower floors have granite framing. Above each gate is a relief head.

The asymmetrical facade is broken up by centered bay flanked by pilaster-like structures and topped by wall dormers. The canted bay at the corner of the building, located closest to the Garrison Church, is topped by a characteristic cloper-clad spire.

The rear side of the building stands in blank brick with dressed ground floor. The workshop building is topped by canticles.

The decorative elements of the facade ("sandstone bands", pilasters and figureheads) are of reinforced concrete elements.

== Interior ==
The building contains four apartments with five to eight rooms as well as kitchen, pantry, bathroom, toilet, maid's room. The plan solution is similar to that of Åhusene on Åboulevard.

== Today ==
Skall Studio, a clothing brand focussing on sustainability, is based at No. 10.

== See also ==
- Lille Strandstræde 22
