= Dannemare =

- Town
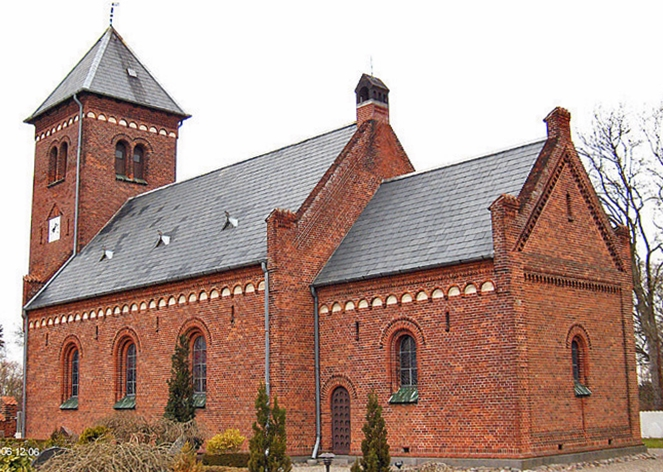
- Dannemare Church

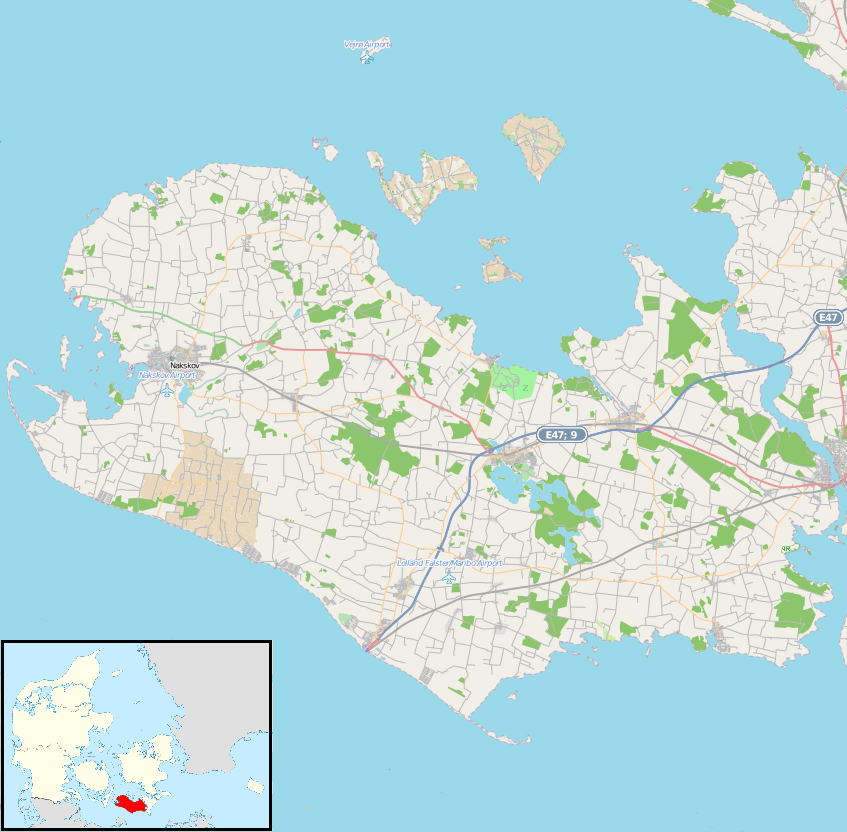
- Location on Lolland
- Coordinates: 54°45′38″N 11°11′14″E
- Country: Denmark
- Region: Zealand (Sjælland)
- Municipality: Lolland Municipality

Area
  - Urban: 0.19 sq mi (0.5 km^{2})

Population (2026)
  - Urban: 365
  - Urban density: 1,900/sq mi (730/km^{2})
- Demonym: Dannemarianer
- Time zone: UTC+1 (CET)
  - Summer (DST): UTC+2 (CEST)

Dannemare is a village on the Danish island of Lolland located 11 km south of Nakskov and 19 km west of Rødby. As of 2026, it has a population of 365.

== History and heritage ==
The area has a long history. A tomb from the 1st century AD has been discovered in Hoby while communities such as Tillitse and Kuditse have Wendian names indicating they were founded by the Wends before the 13th century. The area is also home to the historic manor houses of Ølligesøgård and Bådesgård. The runestone in Tillitse churchyard is from the early 11th century. The recently restored belfry in Gloslunde is one of Denmark's oldest wooden buildings dating from the 15th century.

From 1926 to 1953, Dannemare was a station on the Nakskov-Rødby railway. The old station building can still be seen at No. 18 Stationsvej.

== Landmarks ==
Historic churches in the area include the early 13th century Romanesque churches of Arninge, Græshave, Groslunde and Tillitse. Dannemare Church, also originally from the Romanesque period, was rebuilt in 1897 after a fire.

Rudbjerggaard, a half-timbered manor house completed in 1502, is located 5 km to the west of the village.

== The village today ==
Dannemare has a school, a cultural centre, a kindergarten, a food store, restaurants, hairdressers and several associations. Tourists are attracted to the nearby summer house developments at Hummingen and Kramnitse.
