= Dragør Church =

- Dragør Kirke
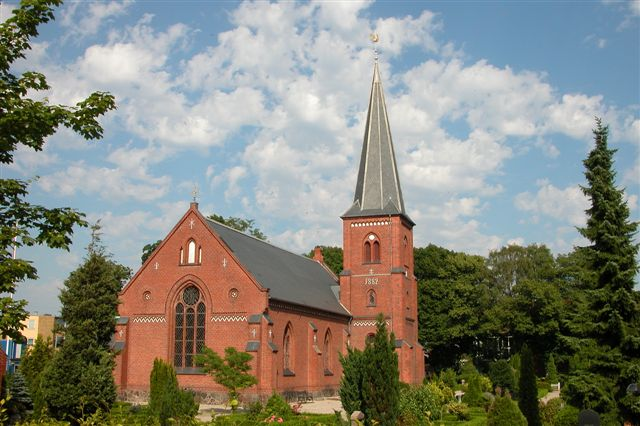
- Church of Christ seen from across the street
- Dragør Church
- 55°35′38″N 12°40′06.5″E
- Location: Dragør
- Country: Denmark
- Denomination: Church of Denmark

History
- Status: Church

Architecture
- Architect: J.H. Wessel
- Architectural type: Church
- Style: Neo-Gothic
- Completed: 1885

Specifications
- Materials: Brick

Administration
- Archdiocese: Diocese of Copenhagen

Dragør Church is a Lutheran church in Dragør, Denmark. It belongs to the Church of Denmark.

== History ==
In 1449, the Bishop of Roskilde authorized the installation of a temporary altar during the annual herring market at Dragør which attracted up to 30,000 traders and fishermen. The market disappeared in about 1500. The few permanent residents had to use Store Magleby Church in nearby Store Magleby some time between 1193 and 1370. After Christian II gave the church to the Dutch farmers who settled in the area in 1621, the church was adapted according to Dutch tradition. Service was also conducted in Dutch and the best seats were reserved for the Dutch families.

Dragør Church was finally inaugurated on 26 April 1885 but remained attached to Store Magleby until 1954 when Dragør finally became its own parish.

== Architecture ==
The church is built in the Neo-Gothiv style. J. H. Wessel's design strongly resembles that of Taarbæk Church north of Copenhagen, which was designed by Carl Emil Wessel, his father. The ceiling is inspired by the cathedral in Limerick, Ireland.

The clock on the east side of the tower is from 1764 and was installed by clockmaker Bernhard Larsen in 1882.

== Graveyard ==
Notable people who are buried at the graveyard include the actor and comedian Dirch Passer, television presenter Otto Leisner and the marine painter Christian Mølsted whose home and studio in Dragør in now a museum dedicated to his art.

=== Burials ===
- Peter Boesen (1945–1982), actor
- Knud Bro (1937–1997), politician
- Christian Brochorst (1907–1967), actor
- Hans Isbrandtsen (1891–1953), shipowner
- Eigil Jensen (1903–1988), lawyer and singer
- Jesper Emil Jensen (1931–009), writer, translator and songwriter
- Otto Leisner (1917–2008), television personality
- Tove Malzer (1941–2008), editor-in-chief and politician
- Hugo Marcussen (1926–1999), architect and civil servant
- Knud Mühlhausen (1909–1990), painter
- Christian Mølsted (1862–1930), painter
- Dirch Passer (1926–1980), actor and comedian
- Clara Selborn (1816–2008), writer and translator
- Sophus Vermehren

== Image gallery ==
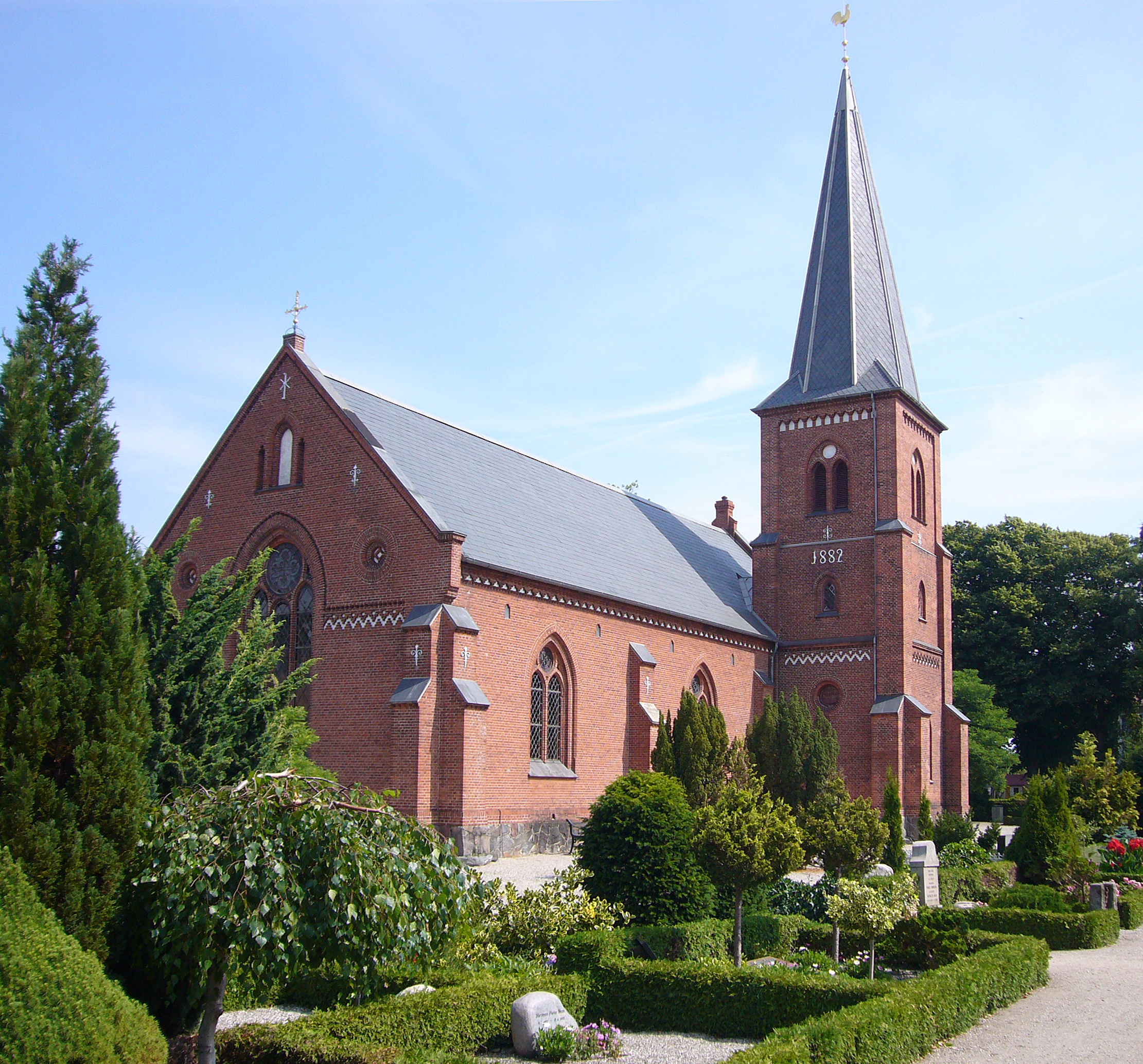

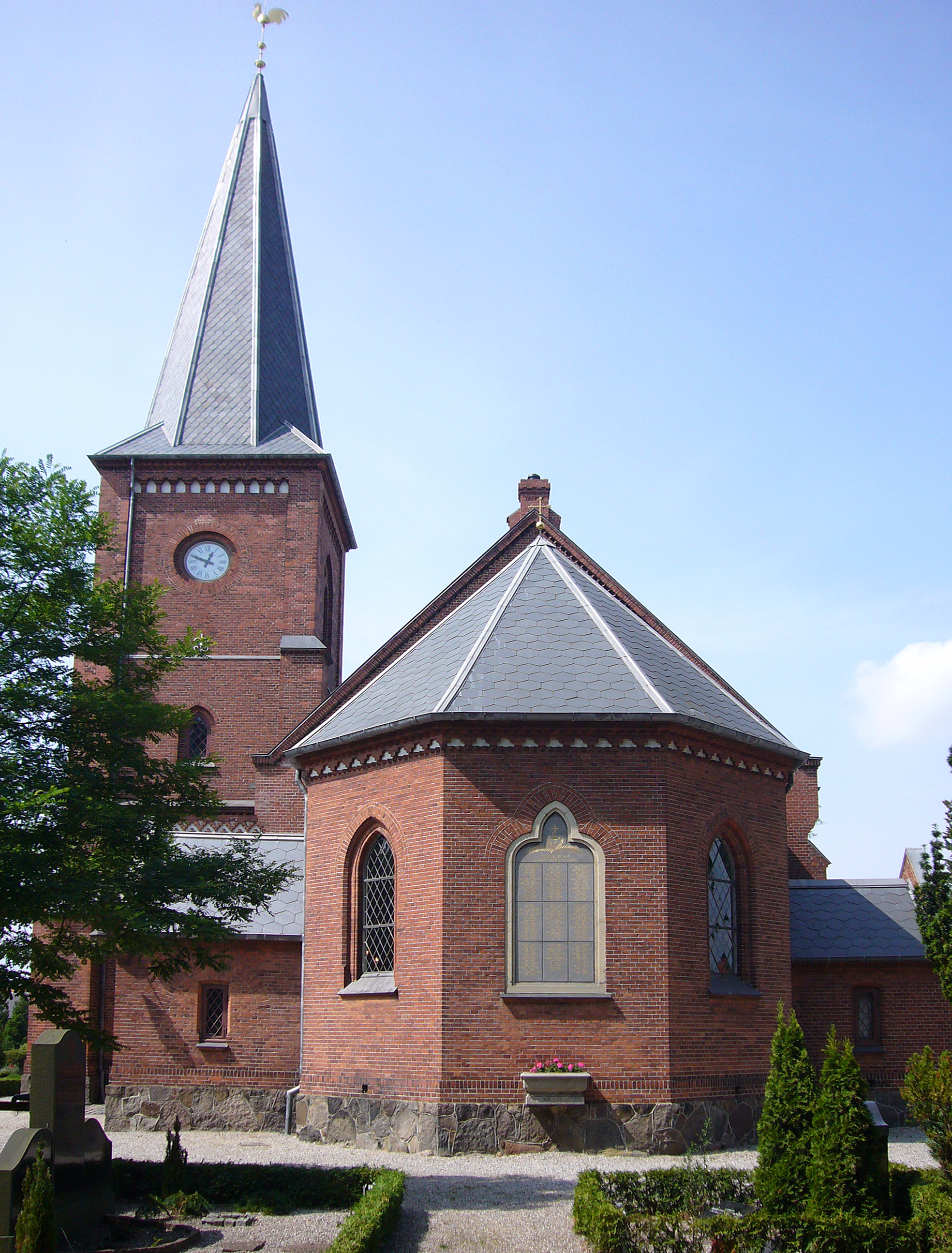

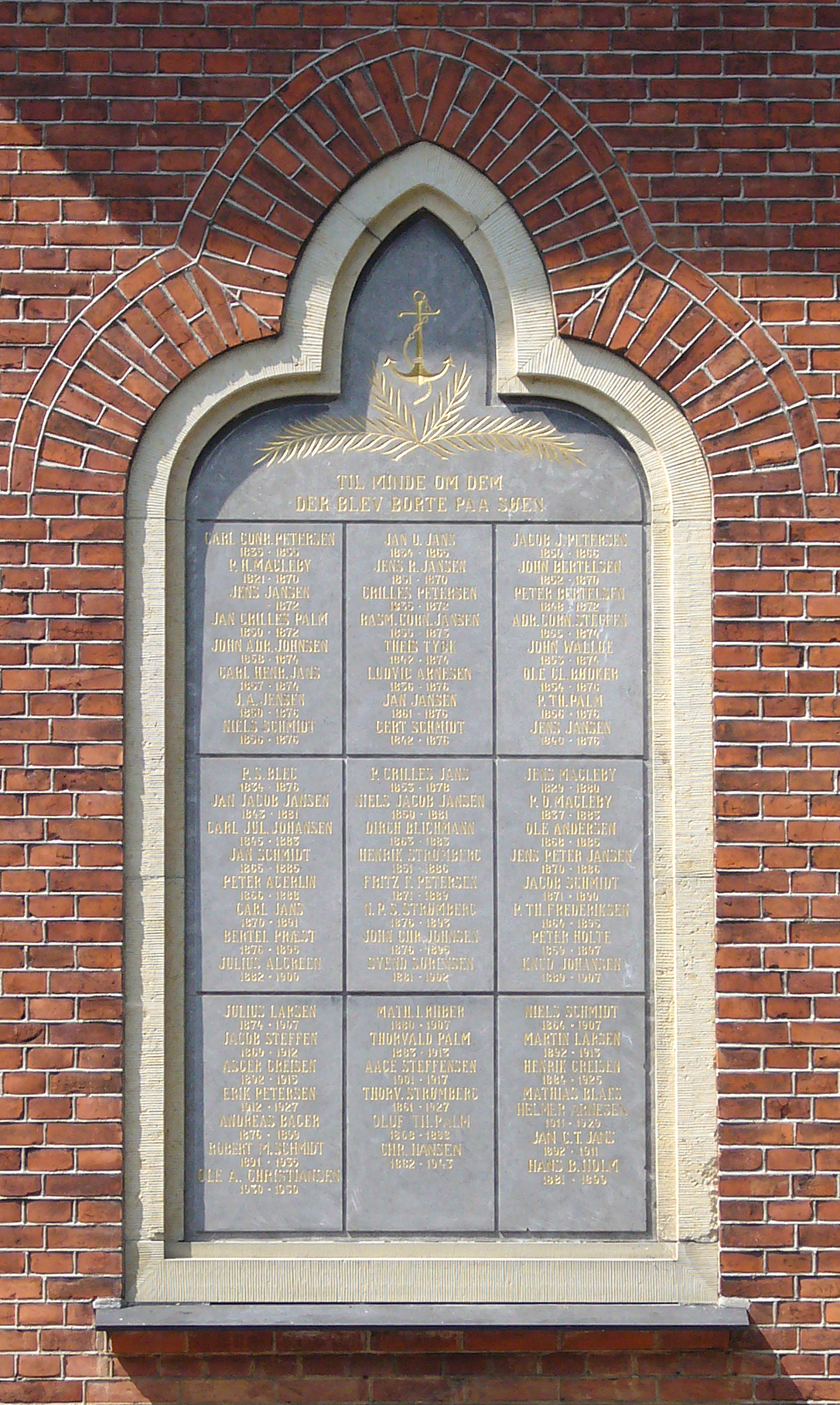
Memorial for sailors lost at sea

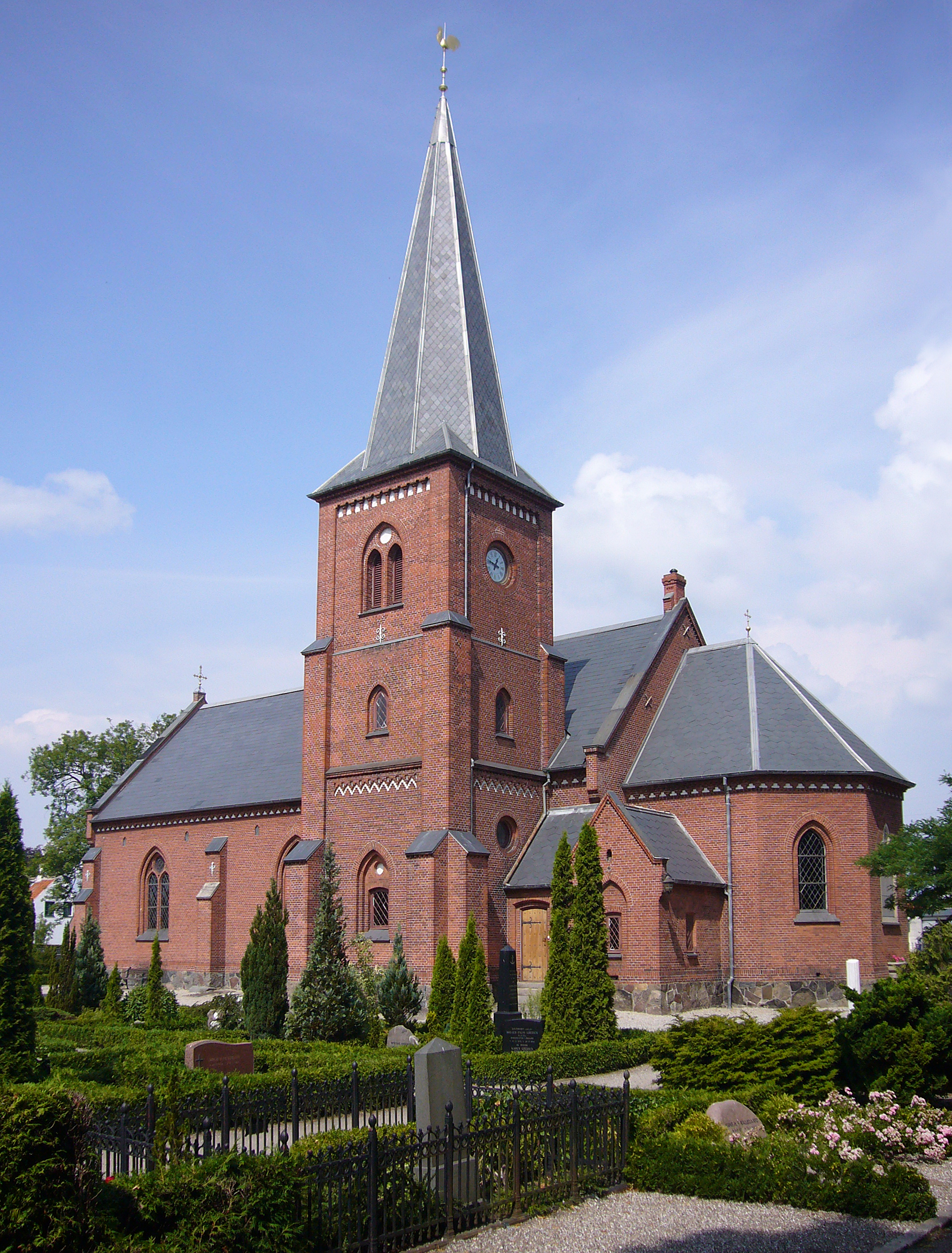
