= Henrik Wenzel =

Danish engineer and academic (born 1956)

- Born: April 28, 1956 (age 70); Store Magleby, Dragør, Denmark
- Education: MSc. Kemiteknik (DTU, 1982)
- Title: Head of Centre at SDU

Henrik Wenzel (born April 28, 1956) is a Danish engineer and head of SDU Life Cycle Engineering at University of Southern Denmark (SDU).

== Career ==
=== Earlier career ===
Henrik Wenzel was trained as a chemical engineer from the Technical University of Denmark (DTU) in 1982. After graduation he started his career in the field of Industrial Water Management and Cleantech, first as a case officer in Ringkøbing County(1982–1988), and then as a project manager on biogas R&D, Nordic Folkecenter for Renewable Energy (1984–1986) and as chairman of the Board of the Western Jutland Energy and Environment Bureau (1986–1988).

He then worked as a research associate at the Technical University of Denmark (1988–1989) and as a senior consultant at the Water Quality Institute (VKI) of the Danish Academy of Technical Sciences (1989–1991), where he worked as wastewater consultant for many of the largest water consumers in Danish chemical and biotech industry as well as cleantech consultant in textile and paper industry in Denmark and abroad, especially in Eastern Europe (for example Poland) and South Africa.

=== Institute for Product Development ===
In 1991, Henrik was employed as a project manager (1991–1994) and later as head (1994–2005) of the Life Cycle Centre at Institute for Product Development (IPU), where he headed the development of the internationally recognized EDIP methodology for Life Cycle Assessment and Eco-design of industrial products in co-operation with colleagues and leading Danish manufacturing companies. He was also employed as an associate professor at the Technical University of Denmark from 1999 to 2007.

Henrik received the DADES prize, in 1996 and co-received the Nordic Council’s Great Nature and Environment Prize in 1997 (together with colleagues from IPU) and the EU Environmental Prize on national level in 1997 (together with colleagues from the EDIP project).

=== University of Southern Denmark ===
In 2007, Henrik moved to University of Southern Denmark and founded the International Life Cycle Group (now SDU Life Cycle Engineering). This Group grew quickly from 1 person in 2007 to about 15 persons in 2015 under his leadership.

At SDU, he has focused his research mainly on the sustainable development and system integration of societal infrastructure, especially waste & resource management systems, energy & transport systems and biomass & agricultural systems.

Due to his contribution to research and the regional development of Funen, Henrik was awarded the Fyns Stiftstidendes Forskerpris in 2015.

== Academic achievements ==
Up till April 2016, Henrik has authored and co-authored around 350 publications. Wenzel has been involved in the development and teaching of around 20 graduate and postgraduate courses during his career. He has supervised or co-supervised a total of around 100 bachelor and master students and 15 PhD students/postdocs. He has managed a total of around 170 research and development projects for a large variety of research organisations, authority agencies, industrial companies and NGOs in more than 10 countries and the EU.

According to Google Scholar, he has an H-index of 27 and i10-index of 54 (up until April 2016).

== Other positions ==
- Member of the Society of Ecotoxicology and Chemistry (SETAC) (1995–2001) and chair of the subgroup on LCA-Application (1995–1996)
- Member of the Danish LCA Advisory Group (1996–2000)
- Danish delegate of the NATO/Science for Peace and Security Pilot Study on Clean Products and Processes (1998 – 2008)
- Editorial board member of Clean Technologies and Environmental Policy (2007-date)
- Member of the International Expert Group for Life Cycle Assessment for Integrated Waste Management (2007 – date)
- Member of the Technical Council of DAKOFA (Waste & Resource Network Denmark) (2008 – date)
