= Listed buildings in Dragør Municipality =

This is a list of listed buildings in Dragør Municipality, Denmark.

== The list ==
| Listing name | Image | Location | Coordinates | Description |
|---|---|---|---|---|
| Badstuevælen 3 | | Badstuevælen 3, 2791 Dragør | 55°35′38.12″N 12°40′17.53″E | Building towards Lillegade from c. 1840 |
| Badstuevælen 8 | | Badstuevælen 8, 2791 Dragør | 55°35′37.78″N 12°40′20.47″E | House from 1785 by Johan Blichmann |
| Badstuevælen 12 | | Badstuevælen 12, 2791 Dragør | 55°35′37.3″N 12°40′20.69″E | House from c. 1820 |
| Badstuevælen 12 | | Badstuevælen 12, 2791 Dragør | 55°35′37.3″N 12°40′20.69″E | Outbuilding |
| Bjergerlav 3 | | Bjergerlav 3, 2791 Dragør | 55°35′34.61″N 12°40′15.35″E | House with side wing from the 18th century which was rebuilt in 1852 |
| Bjergerlav 5 | | Bjergerlav 5, 2791 Dragør | 55°35′34.6″N 12°40′16.86″E | House with side wing from c. 1824 which was altered in 1884 |
| Bjergerlav 7 | | Bjergerlav 7, 2791 Dragør | 55°35′34.6″N 12°40′16.86″E | House from the 18th century with later alterations |
| Bjergerlav 9 | | Bjergerlav 9, 2791 Dragør | 55°35′34.59″N 12°40′17.2″E | House from before 1833 with later alterations |
| Bjergerlav 11 | | Bjergerlav 11, 2791 Dragør | 55°35′34.52″N 12°40′17.62″E | House from the 18th century |
| Blegerstræde 16 A and Rønne Allé 28 | | Blegerstræde 16, 2791 Dragø | 55°35′29.22″N 12°40′17.62″E | Part of House from 1796 |
| Blegerstræde 16 A and Rønne Allé 28 | | Rønne Alle 28, 2791 Dragør | 55°35′29.18″N 12°40′18.33″E | Part of house from 1796 |
| Bymandsgade 12: Blegerhuset | | Bymandsgade 12, 2791 Dragør | 55°35′30.17″N 12°40′17.8″E | Building from the late 19th century |
| Byskriverstræde 5 | | Byskriverstræde 5, 2791 Dragør | 55°35′29.11″N 12°40′24.93″E | House from 1784 and later |
| Byskriverstræde 7 | | Byskriverstræde 7, 2791 Dragør | 55°35′28.75″N 12°40′25.12″E | House from c. 1706 |
| Christian Mølstedsgade 3 | | Chr Mølstedsgade 3, 2791 Dragør | 55°35′32.17″N 12°40′15.34″E | House from the 18th century |
| Christian Mølstedsgade 5 | | Chr Mølstedsgade 5, 2791 Dragør | 55°35′32.2″N 12°40′16.11″E | House from 1851 |
| Christian Mølstedsgade 7 | | Chr Mølstedsgade 7, 2791 Dragør | 55°35′32.23″N 12°40′16.9″E | House from 1867 |
| Christian Mølstedsgade 12 | | Chr Mølstedsgade 12, 2791 Dragør | 55°35′33.08″N 12°40′18.35″E | House from 1792 |
| Dr. Dichs Plads 1A: Mølsted Museum | | Dr. Dichs Plads 1A, 2791 Dragør | 55°35′32.25″N 12°40′17.87″E | House from the 18th century with later alterations |
| E.C. Hammersvej 5 | | E C Hammersvej 5, 2791 Dragør | 55°35′40.49″N 12°40′16.14″E | Vuilding from 1836 |
| Fogdens Plads 2 A-B | | Fogdens Plads 2A, 2791 Dragør | 55°35′29″N 12°40′23.13″E | House with side wing from c. 1780 by Johan Blichmann |
| Fogdens Plads 13 A-B | | Fogdens Plads 13A, 2791 Dragør | 55°35′29.1″N 12°40′21.66″E | House |
| Fogdens Plads 13 A-B | | Fogdens Plads 13A, 2791 Dragør | 55°35′29.1″N 12°40′21.66″E | Outbuilding |
| Fogdens Plads 13 A-B | | Fogdens Plads 13A, 2791 Dragør | 55°35′29.1″N 12°40′21.66″E | Outbuilding |
| Fogdens Plads 14 | | Fogdens Plads 14, 2791 Dragør | 55°35′29″N 12°40′23.13″E | House from the 18th century and later |
| Hollandsfed 1 | | Hollandsfed 1, 2791 Dragør | 55°35′34.84″N 12°40′24.65″E | Building with side wing from 1855 and 1869 |
| Jens Eyberts Plads 1 | | Jens Eyberts Plads 1, 2791 Dragør | 55°35′33.74″N 12°40′19.02″E | House with side wing from the 18th century |
| Jens Eyberts Plads 1 | | Jens Eyberts Plads 1, 2791 Dragør | 55°35′33.74″N 12°40′19.02″E | Free-standing outbuilding from the 1890s |
| Jens Eyberts Plads 2 | | Jens Eyberts Plads 2, 2791 Dragør | 55°35′33.8″N 12°40′19.43″E | House from c. 1868 and side wing |
| Jens Eyberts Plads 3 | | Jens Eyberts Plads 3, 2791 Dragør | 55°35′33.16″N 12°40′18.83″E | The northern building, dating from before 1793 |
| Jens Eyberts Plads 6 | | Jens Eyberts Plads 6, 2791 Dragør | 55°35′32.98″N 12°40′19.91″E | The northern building, dating from before 1793 |
| Museumsgården | | Hovedgaden 12, 2791 Dragør | 55°36′0.4″N 12°38′9.35″E | |
| Museumsgården | | Hovedgaden 12, 2791 Dragør | 55°36′0.4″N 12°38′9.35″E | |
| Museumsgården | | Hovedgaden 12, 2791 Dragør | 55°36′0.4″N 12°38′9.35″E | |
| Museumsgården | | Hovedgaden 12, 2791 Dragør | 55°36′0.4″N 12°38′9.35″E | |
| Nordgården | | Hovedgaden 2, 2791 Dragør | 55°36′3.49″N 12°38′10.75″E | |
| Nordgården | | Hovedgaden 2, 2791 Dragør | 55°36′3.49″N 12°38′10.75″E | |
| Nordgården | | Hovedgaden 2, 2791 Dragør | 55°36′3.49″N 12°38′10.75″E | |
| Nordgården | | Hovedgaden 4, 2791 Dragør | 55°36′2.84″N 12°38′10.39″E | |
| Kirkevej 129: | | Kirkevej 129, 2791 Dragør | 55°35′42.07″N 12°40′35.35″E | Residential wing from 1811 of the first farmhouse in Daragør |
| Skipperstræde 2 | | Skipperstræde 2, 2791 Dragør | 55°35′34.09″N 12°40′22.13″E | House from the 17th century with later laterations |
| Slippen 4 | | Slippen 4, 2791 Dragør | 55°35′34.09″N 12°40′22.13″E | House with northern outbuilding; from 1853-54 but altered in 1877 |
| Strandgade 5 | | Strandgade 5, 2791 Dragør | 55°35′35.48″N 12°40′16.73″E | Building from before 1798 |
| Strandgade 10 | | Strandgade 10, 2791 Dragør | 55°35′36.21″N 12°40′18.19″E | Building from the late 18th century which was refurbished in the 1970s |
| Strandgade 10 | | Strandgade 10, 2791 Dragør | 55°35′36.21″N 12°40′18.19″E | Outbuilding |
| Strandgade 12 | | Strandgade 12, 2791 Dragør | 55°35′36.19″N 12°40′18.76″E | Building from before 1750 with a few later alterations |
| Strandgade 13 | | Strandgade 13, 2791 Dragør | 55°35′35.32″N 12°40′19.87″E | House from c. 1850 with side wing and wooden shed |
| Strandgade 16 | | Strandgade 16, 2791 Dragør | 55°35′35.74″N 12°40′20.27″E | Building with side wing from c. 1800 |
| Von Ostensgade 4 | | Von Ostensgade 4, 2791 Dragør | 55°35′33.76″N 12°40′15.73″E | House from 1842 |
| Von Ostensgade 6 | | Von Ostensgade 6, 2791 Dragør | 55°35′33.96″N 12°40′16.4″E | House from 1854 |
| Von Ostensgade 7 | | Von Ostensgade 7, 2791 Dragør | 55°35′33.45″N 12°40′16.22″E | House from 1842 |
| Von Ostensgade 8 | | Von Ostensgade 8, 2791 Dragør | 55°35′34″N 12°40′17.62″E | House from 1842 |
| Von Ostensgade 8 | | Von Ostensgade 8, 2791 Dragør | 55°35′34″N 12°40′17.62″E | Rastern outbuilding |
| Von Ostensgade 11 | | Von Ostensgade 11, 2791 Dragør | 55°35′33.56″N 12°40′17.27″E | House from 1842 |
| Von Ostensgade 13 | | Von Ostensgade 7, 2791 Dragør | 55°35′33.62″N 12°40′17.97″E | House from 1842 |
| Von Ostensgade 27 | | Von Ostensgade 27, 2791 Dragør | 55°35′34.25″N 12°40′23.84″E | Corner building from the 18th century and later |
| Von Ostensgade 30 | | Von Ostensgade 30, 2791 Dragør | 55°35′34.59″N 12°40′23.08″E | House from 1867 by Rasmus Peter Guldborg |
| Von Ostensgade 32 | | Von Ostensgade 32, 2791 Dragør | 55°35′34.65″N 12°40′23.54″E | House from the 18th century which was rebuilt in brick in the 19th century and a side wing from 1851 |
| Zytfensgade 3: Tulipanhuset | | Zytfensgade 3, 2791 Dragør | 55°35′32.83″N 12°40′27.25″E | House from c. 1800 which was rebuilt in 1842 and again in 1857 |
| Zytfensgade 4 | | | Zytfensgade 4, 2791 Dragør | 55°35′33.28″N 12°40′27.34″E | House from c. c. 1780 by Johan Blichmann |
| Zytfensgade 4 | | | Zytfensgade 4, 2791 Dragør | 55°35′33.28″N 12°40′27.34″E | Outvuilding |
