= Christian Mølsted =

Danish painter (1862–1930)

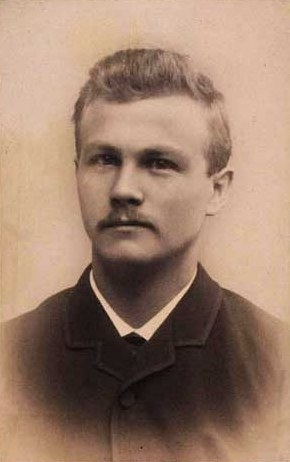
Mølsted in the 1890s

Christian Ferdinand Andreas Mølsted (15 October 1862 – 10 May 1930) was a Danish painter who specialized in marine art. He is best known for his painting of the frigate Niels Juel during the Battle of Heligoland on 9 May 1864.

== Biography ==
Born in Dragør, he was the son of Andreas Adolf Nikolaj Mølsted, a fisherman, and Ane Hans-Nielsdatter. With financial support from a relative, he completed his education in Copenhagen at Det tekniske Selskab where he graduated in 1879. After sailing to Madeira that summer on the frigate Jylland, he entered the Danish Academy in October 1880, under the tutelage of Frederik Vermehren, Jorgen Roed, Julius Exner and Carl Bloch. During his studies, he travelled to Paris and London where he was able to observe the trends in contemporary art. His first showing came in 1884 and he continued to be a regular participant in the Charlottenborg Spring Exhibition.

He graduated from the Academy in January 1885, set out to become a marine painter and received instruction from two local self-taught artists in Dragør, Commander Peder Foss (1821-1882) and the pilot, Hendrik Strømberg (1840-1916). In 1889, he was awarded the Neuhausenske Prize for his Ships in the Harbor at Larsens Plads. His subjects are for the most part taken from the coasts around Copenhagen or in Jutland.

Among the artist’s favorite subjects were the heroic battles of captains Peter Tordenskjold and Peter Willemoes. Historical details, as well as detailed information about the ships, was provided for the paintings by Otto Dorge, a local expert in Dragør. Later in life, he also created genre paintings. Mølsted's works were widely appreciated for his perfectionist approach, his attention to historical detail and his ability to bring things to life.

He died on 10 May 1930 in Dragør and is buried in the cemetery at Dragør Church. His studio in Dragør now serves as a museum of his works. The display contains a wide range of his artwork from his marine paintings to local subjects.

== Selected works ==
- En engelsk Brig erobres af danske Kanonbaade (1887)
- Peder Bredals Skibe ises ud af Nyborg-Fjord (1891)
- Om Bord i Fregatten Niels Juel, under Kampen ved Helgoland den 9. Maj 1864 (1898)
- Slaget paa Reden; Willemoes om Bord i det Gernerske Flaadebatteri (1901)
- Willemoes' Død om Bord i Linieskibet Prinds Christian Frederik, under Kampen ved Sjællands Odde (1906)
- Aalefiskere; Efleraarsstemning i Drogden (1908)
- Solopgang i Drogden (1909)
- Tordenskjolds Landgang i Marstrand (1910).

== Gallery ==
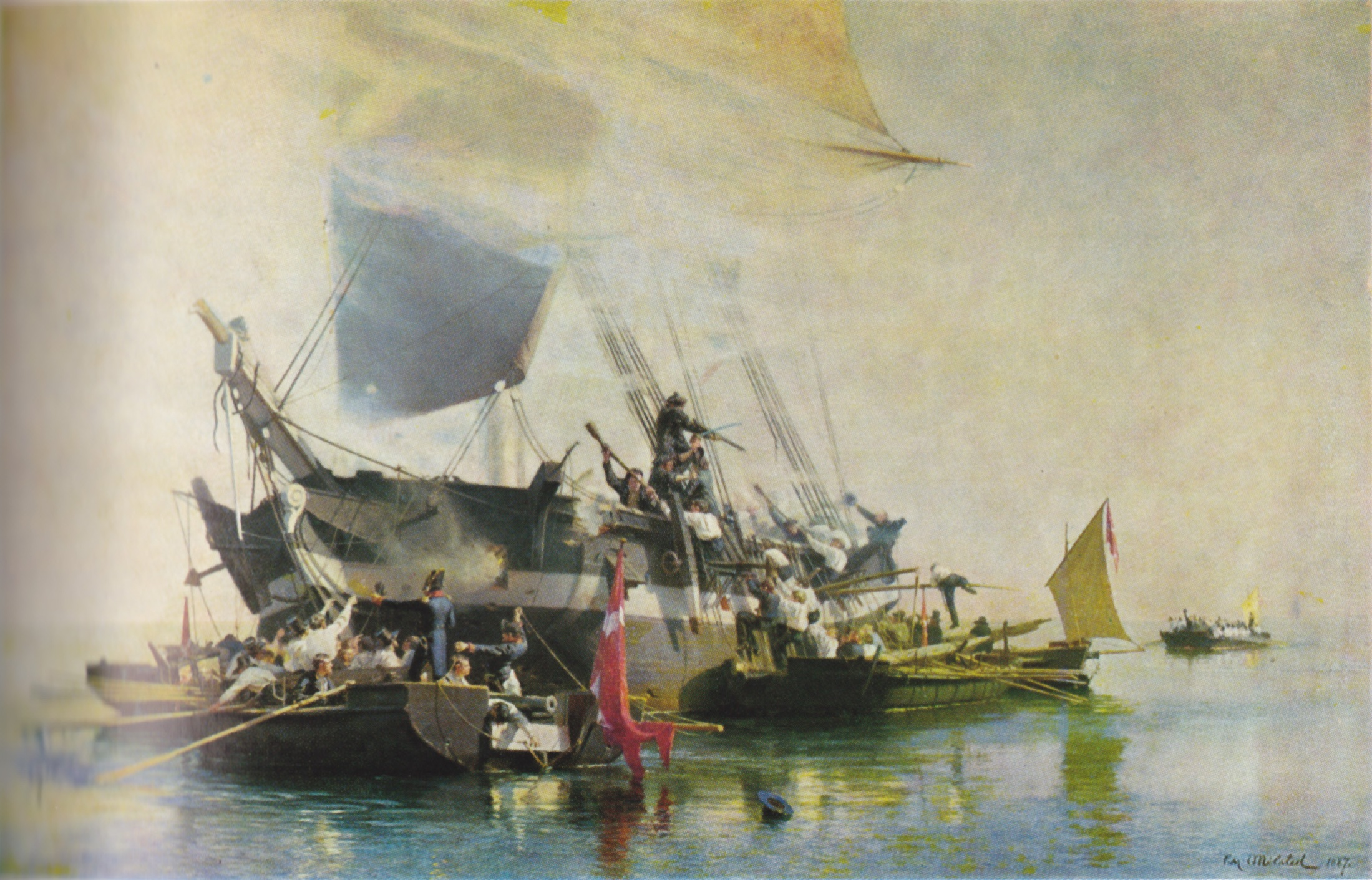
English brig attacked by Danish-Norwegian gunboats (1887)

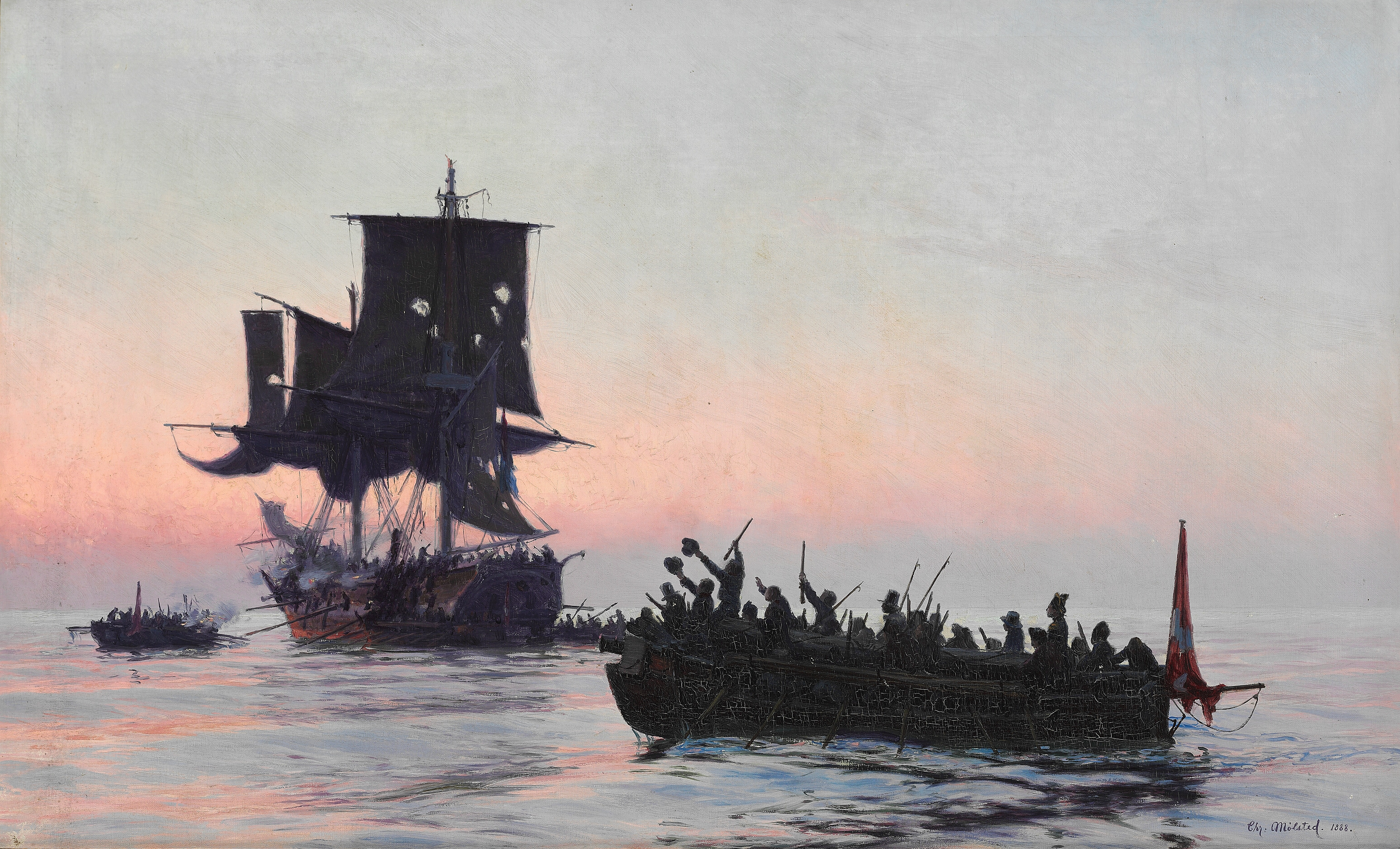
Danish privateers intercepting an enemy vessel during the Napoleonic Wars (1888)

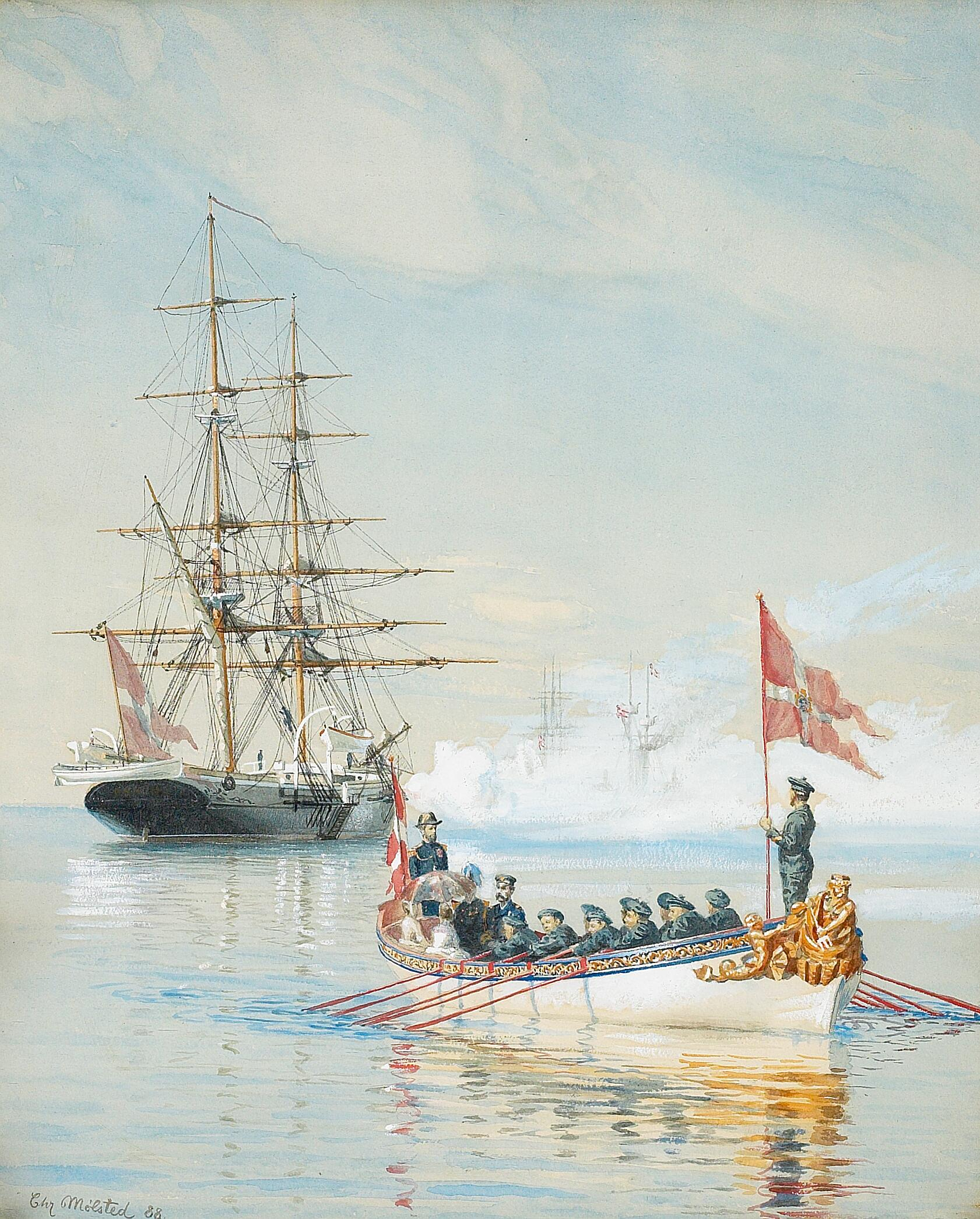
Scene with saluting at Dragør for King Christian IX, Queen Louise, Tsar of Russia Alexander III and Empress Dagmar (1888)

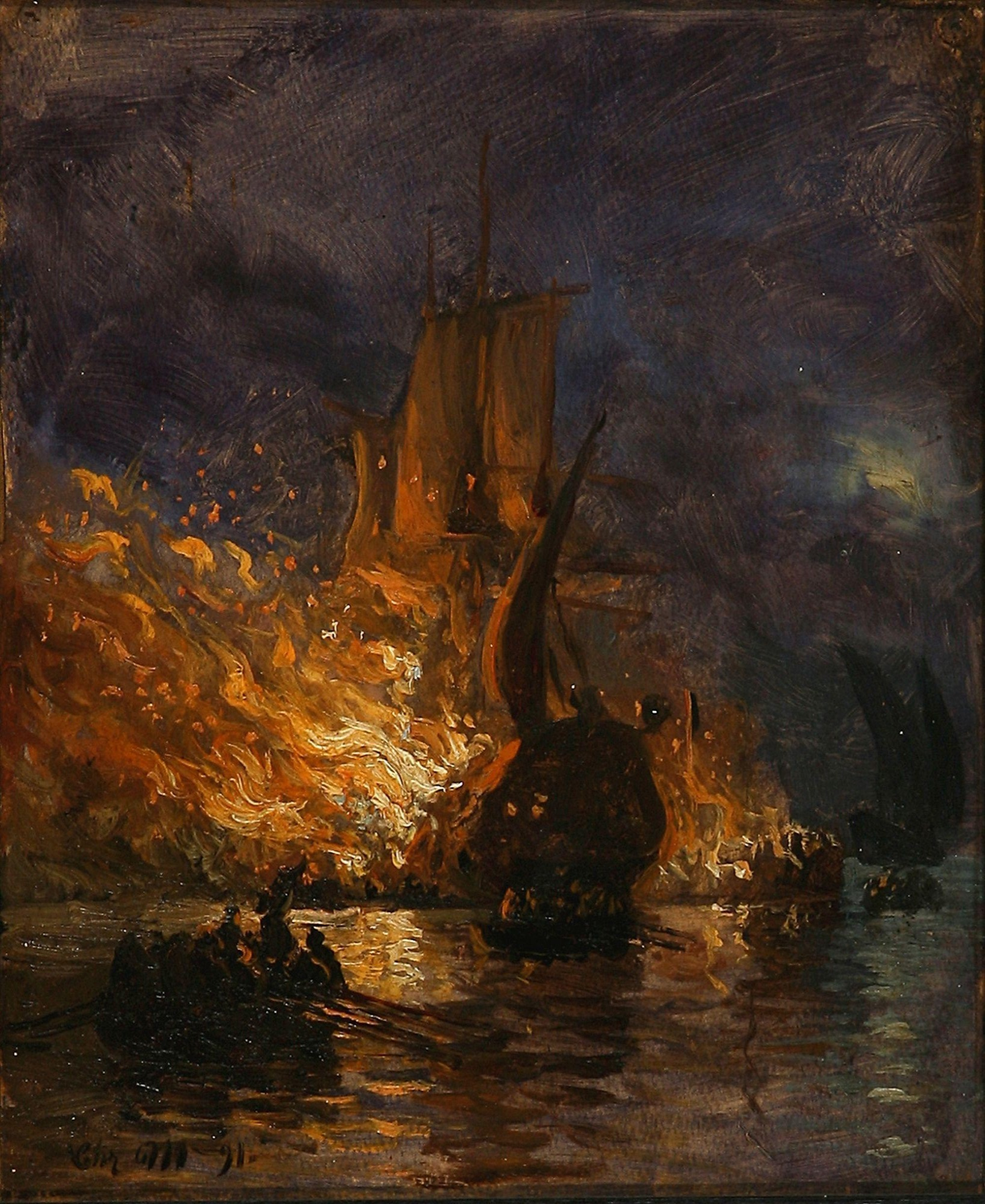
Tordenskjold in the Gothenburg Fjord (1891)

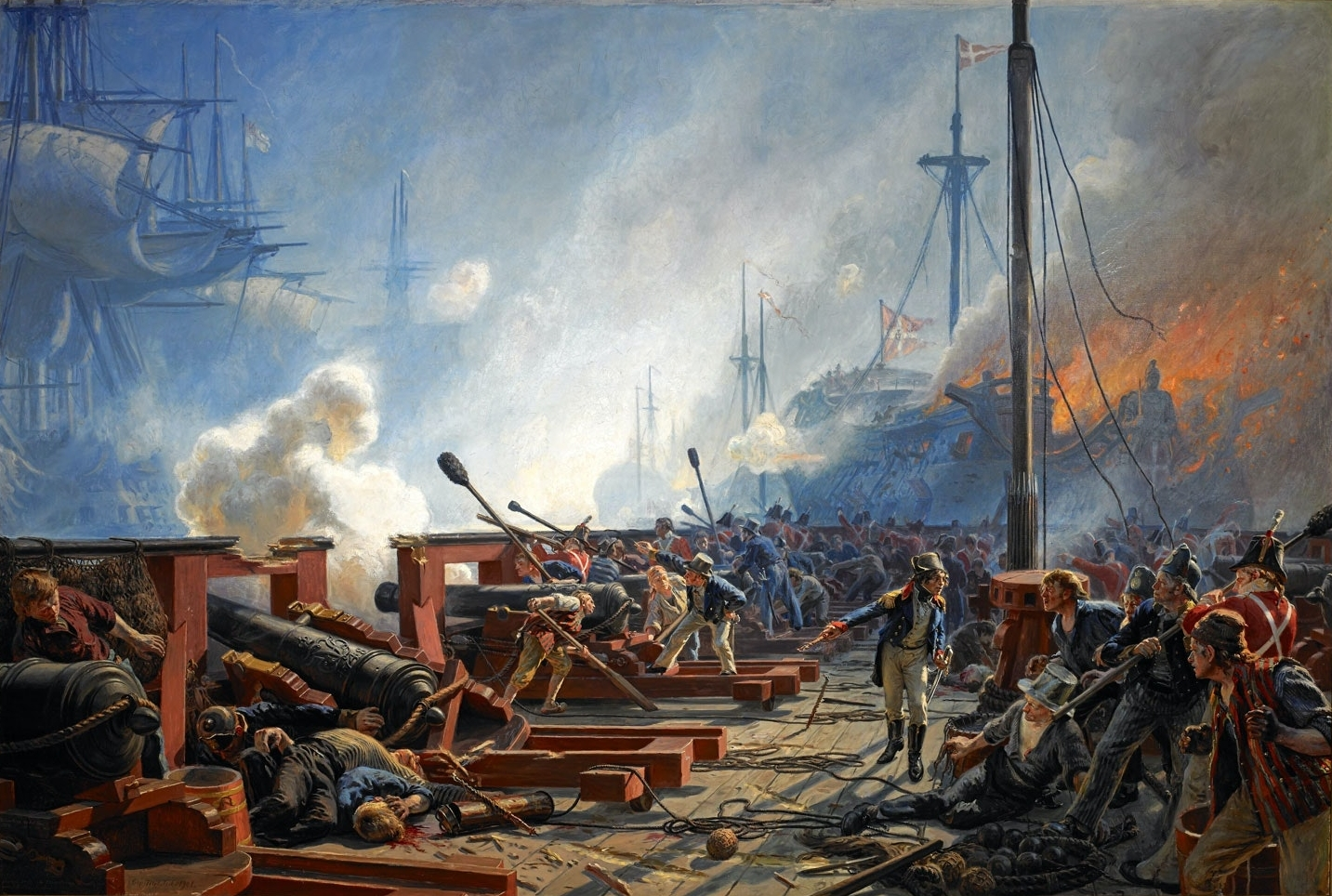
The Battle of Copenhagen (1901)

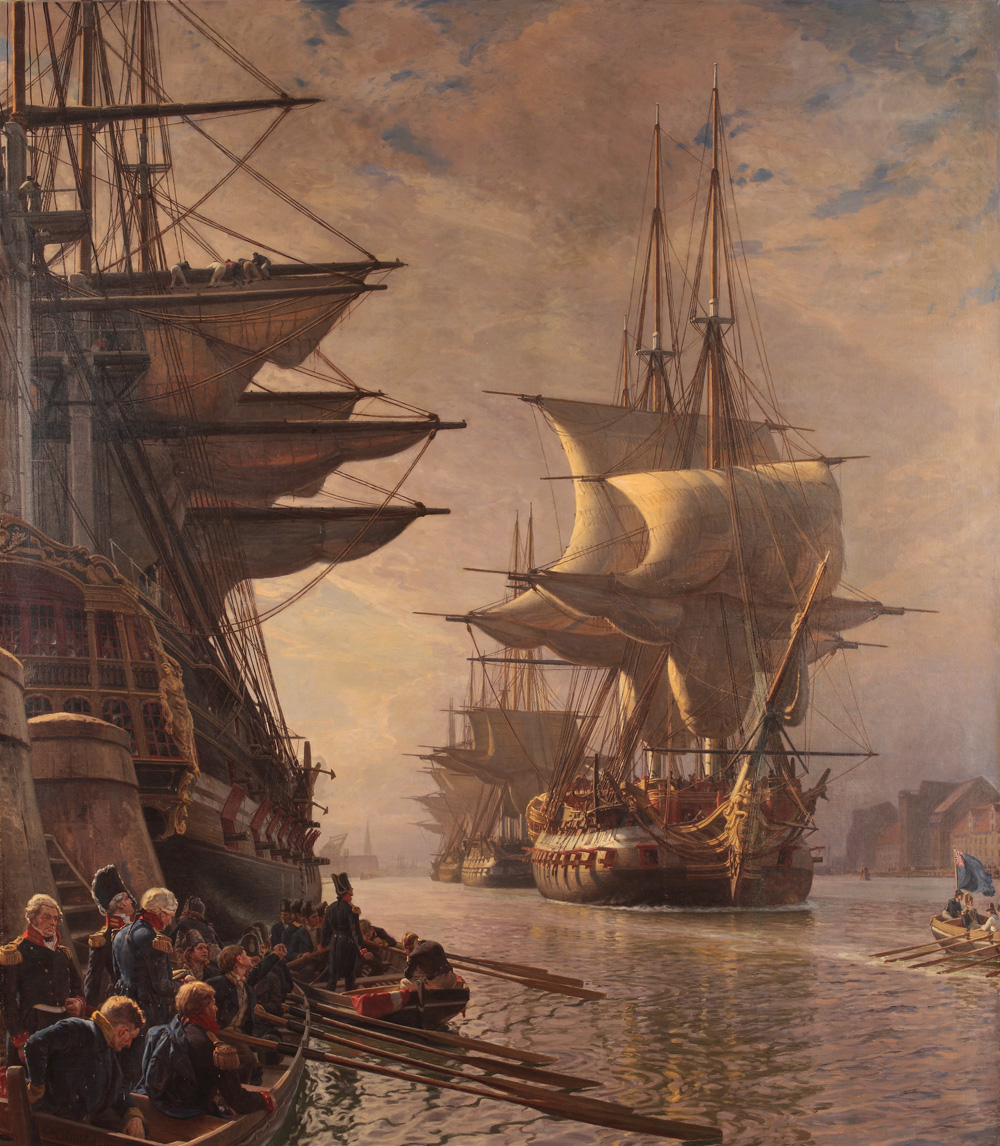
The fleet leaves the harbor for the last time (1919)

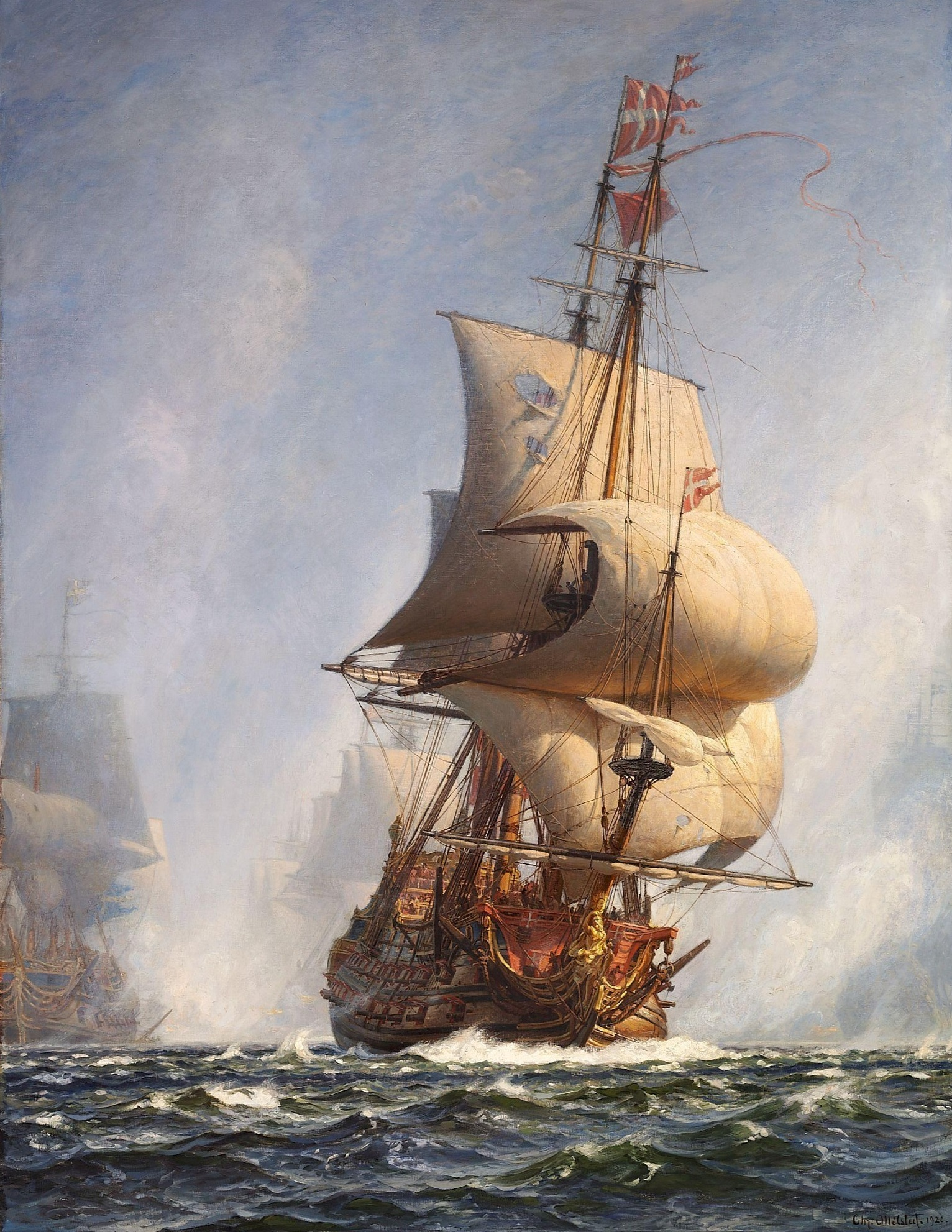
The breakthrough during the Battle of Køge Bay, July 1, 1677 (1920)

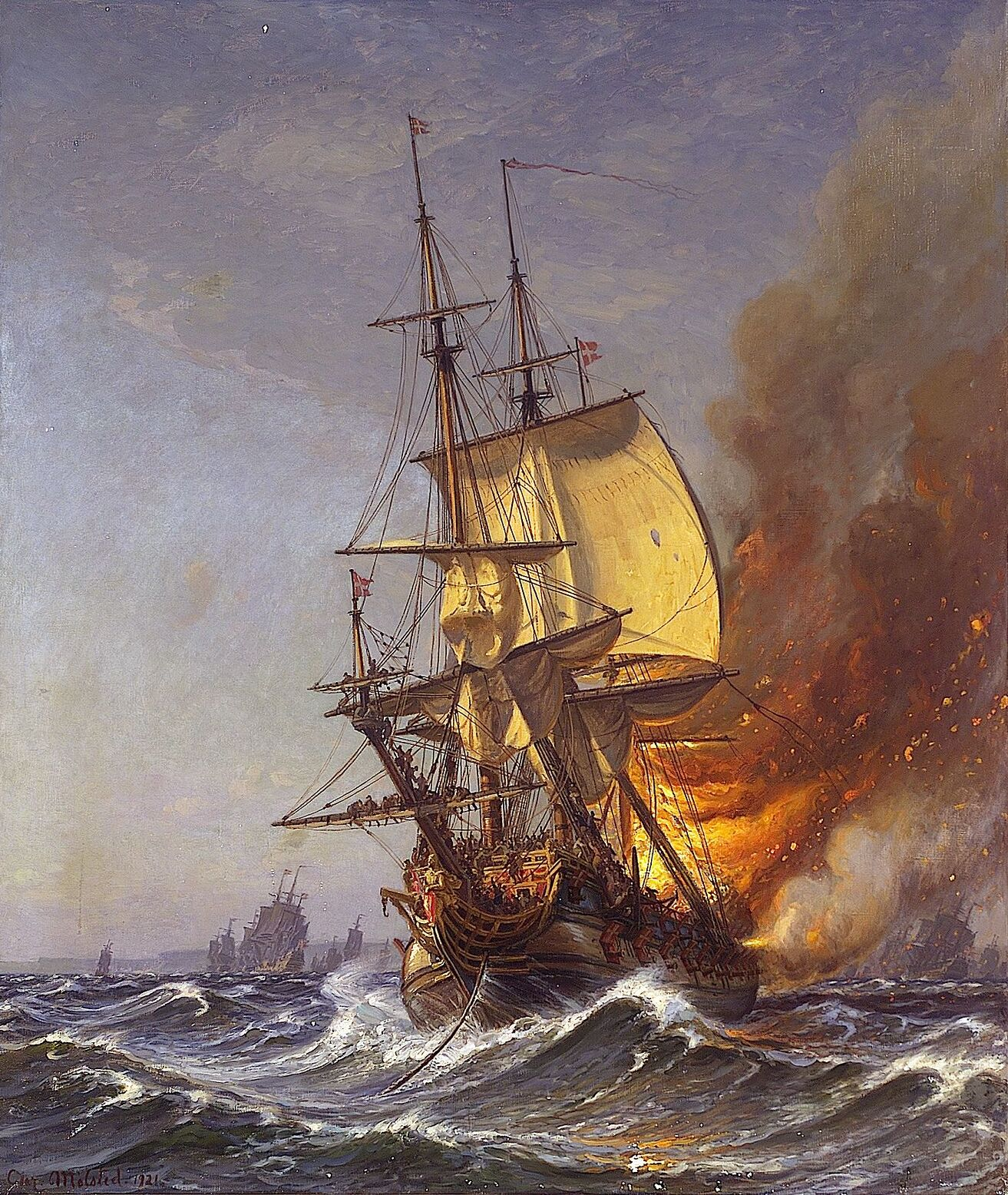
The Danish ship Dannebroge caught on fire in the battle of Køge Bay (1921)
