= Store Magleby =

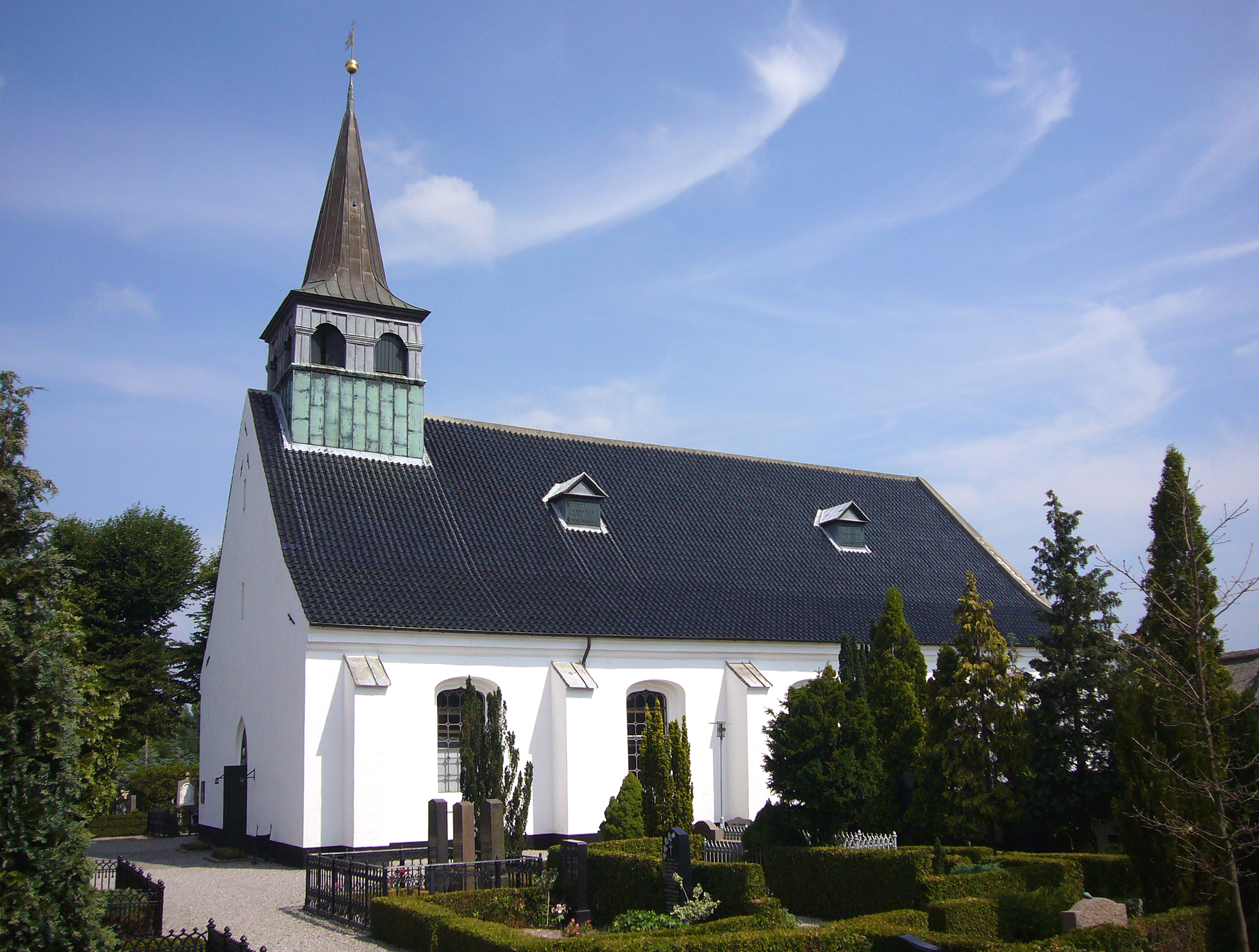
- Store Magleby Church

- Location within Denmark
- Coordinates: 55°35′46″N 12°38′07″E
- Country: Denmark
- Region: Capital (Hovedstaden)
- Municipality: Dragør

Government
  - Mayor: Allan Holst
- Elevation: 5 m (16 ft)

Population (2009)
  - Total: 2,000
- Time zone: UTC+1 (Central Europe Time)
  - Summer (DST): UTC+2

Store Magleby is a Danish town, seat with Dragør of the Dragør Municipality, in the Region Hovedstaden. Its population in 2009 was 2,000.

== History ==
Traces of an early Iron Age settlement from about the year 200 AD have been found just south east of Store Magleby Church. In 1521 Christian II invited Dutch-speaking families (from especially Nieuwpoort and Mechelen in present-day Belgium) to settle in the parish and grow vegetables. On arrival they received existing farms. It is used to be thought that they came from Waterland, but nowadays it is believed the origins of at least some of the settlers lay elsewhere in the present-day Netherlands or even Flanders. Dutch continued in use in the village until the early 19th century, and it is still colloquially named Hollænderbyen ('Dutch town'). Fires destroyed the town and farms in 1658 (Swedish Wars), 1809 and 1821. Most were rebuilt in the village, but several moved out to the fields and are still seen in the open countryside.

== Geography ==
Store Magleby is located in the southern side of the island of Amager, close to Maglebylille, Dragør and Tårnby. It lies close to Copenhagen and to its urban area.

== Notable people ==
- Asta Hansen (1914 in Store Magleby – 1962) a Danish stage and film actress
- Henrik Wenzel (born 1956 in Store Magleby) a Danish engineer and head of SDU Life Cycle Engineering at University of Southern Denmark
