= Dragør =

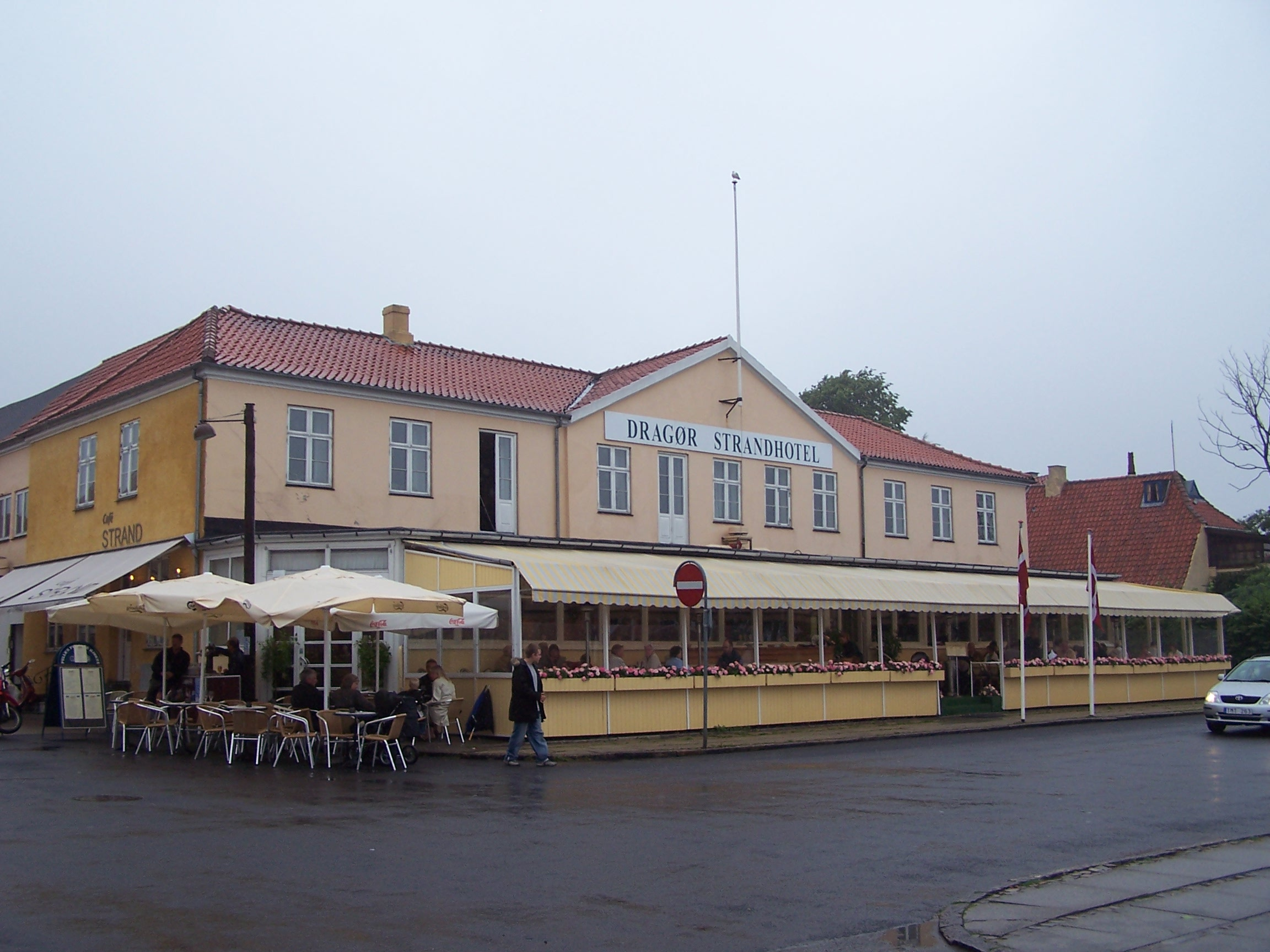
- Dragør Strandhotel

- Location in Denmark Dragør (Capital Region)
- Coordinates: 55°35′33″N 12°40′20″E
- Country: Denmark
- Region: Capital (Hovedstaden)
- Municipality: Dragør

Government
  - Mayor: Kenneth Gotterup

Area
  - Urban: 4.72 km^{2} (1.82 sq mi)

Population (2026)
  - Urban: 12,293
  - Urban density: 2,600/km^{2} (6,750/sq mi)
  - Gender: 5,972 males and 6,321 females
- Time zone: UTC+1 (Central Europe Time)
  - Summer (DST): UTC+2
- Website: https://www.dragoer.dk/

Dragør (Danish pronunciation: [ˈtʁɑːwˌøɐ̯ˀ]) is the main town of Dragør Municipality, (Denmark), which includes the village of Store Magleby. The city hall and seat of the municipal council lies on Kirkevej 7 (postal code 2791 Dragør) in Store Magleby, which has enough space for such a large building.

== Geography ==
Dragør, on the southeastern coast of the island of Amager, is located only 12 km from central Copenhagen. Together with the neighbouring village of Store Magleby, it forms a separate urban area with a population of 12,304 (1 January 2025).

Dragør has many well-preserved historical buildings. The old part of the town is a compact, picturesque maze of alleys with yellow-painted houses, red roofs, and cobblestone streets built in the traditional Danish style. Many of these buildings are hundreds of years old.

Dragør was a prosperous seafaring town in the latter half of the 19th century, and its charming harbour front is still in use.

== History ==
Dragør was founded in the 12th century, and grew quickly as a fishing port. In 1370, the Hanseatic League was granted some trade privileges in the town. Dragør continued to grow - as the home of one of the largest fishing fleets in the country and as a base for salting and processing fish.

The first part of the name, Drag-, refers to drawing (dragging) boats ashore. The ending -ør is common in Scandinavian placenames and means a beach covered in sand or gravel.

The area has a Dutch ancestry that is still much in evidence. In the early 16th century, King Christian II invited a group of farmers from the Netherlands — at the time a more agriculturally advanced nation than Denmark — to settle in the area and produce food for the royal household. Twenty-four families arrived. They and their descendants settled in the village of Store Magleby. Tensions between the Dutch farmers of the inland and the Danish fishermen and sailors at the coast are still detectable now, with a certain rivalry between citizens of Store Magleby and Dragør. The Dutch peasants delivered vegetables to the Amagertorv market in Copenhagen. Among their many other achievements they were responsible for introducing the carrot to Denmark. Dutch and Low German were still spoken on Amager until the 19th century.

Dragør was made an independent parish 1 April 1954, before that being a part of Store Magleby parish.

== Attractions ==
- The Amager Museum, an open-air recreation of life in old rural Amager.
- Dragør Museum, a seafaring museum located at Dragør harbour.
- The Kastrupgaard Collection (Kastrupgårdsamlingen) in nearby Kastrup. An art museum on the premises of an estate from the 18th century.
- Mølsted Museum, in the heart of old Dragør in the artist's studio, an art museum dedicated to the works of seascape painter Christian Mølsted (1862–1930).
- Dragør is the sister city of Kodiak, Alaska.

== Economy ==
Prior to its dissolution, Maersk Air had its headquarters in Dragør. When it existed, Sterling Airlines had its head office at Copenhagen Airport South in Dragør.

== Notable people ==
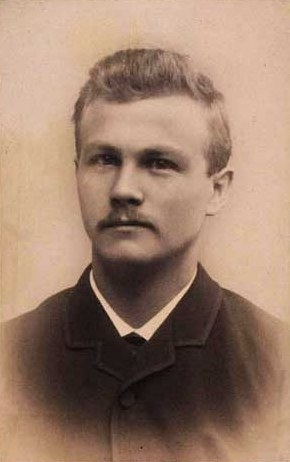
Christian Mølsted, 1890

- Hans Nielsen Jeppesen (1815 in Dragør – 1883) a Danish merchant and ship-owner
- Peter Mærsk Møller (1836 in Rømø – 1927 in Svendborg) a Danish sea captain, started the Maersk business conglomerate, lived in Dragør 1864 to 1884
- Christian Mølsted (1862–1930) a Danish artist who specialized in marine painting
- Arnold Peter Møller (1876 in Dragør – 1965) a Danish shipping magnate who founded A.P. Moller-Maersk Group in 1904
- Marcel Hansen (born 1965) a Danish serial rapist and twice-convicted murderer who was sentenced to life imprisonment, brought up in Dragør
- Silja Schandorff (born 1969 in Dragør) a Danish ballerina, performed with the Royal Danish Ballet 1985 to 2009
- Anne Skare Nielsen (born 1971) a Danish futurist, lecturer, author and partner in Future Navigator; she lives in Dragør

=== Sport ===
- Marc Dal Hende (born 1990 in Dragør) a Danish footballer who plays for FC Midtjylland
- Frederik Schram (born 1995 in Dragør) an Icelandic football goalkeeper, plays for FC Roskilde
- Freja Ravn (born 2000 in Dragør) a Danish badminton player, specializing in doubles play
- David Walther (born 2008 in Dragør) a Danish racing driver
