= Dragør Municipality =

Dragør Municipality Dragør Kommune (Danish)
- Municipality
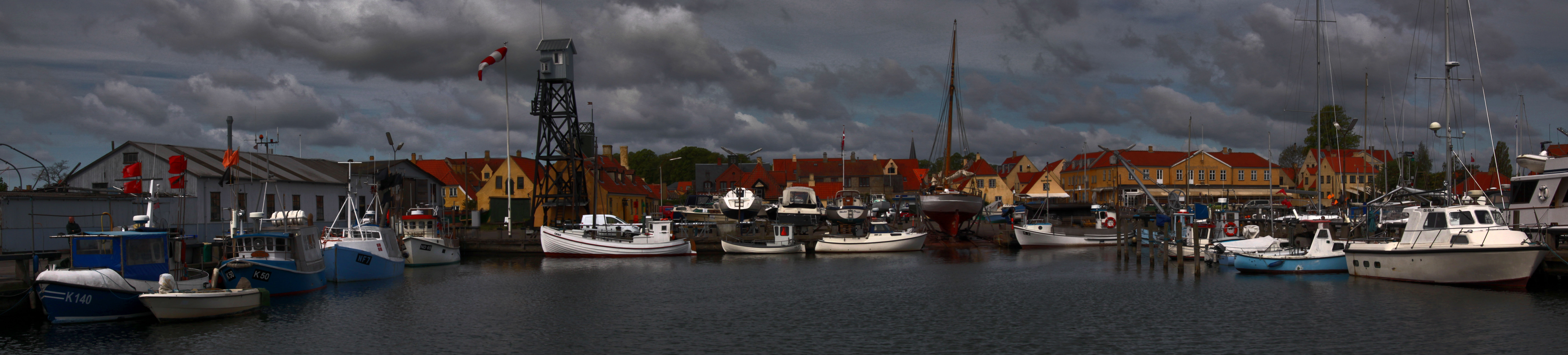

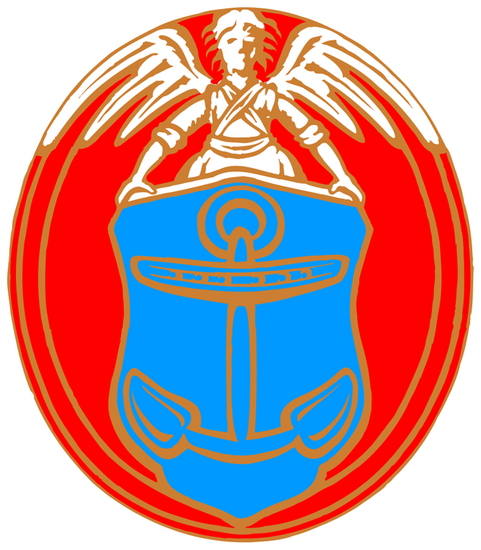
- Coat of arms

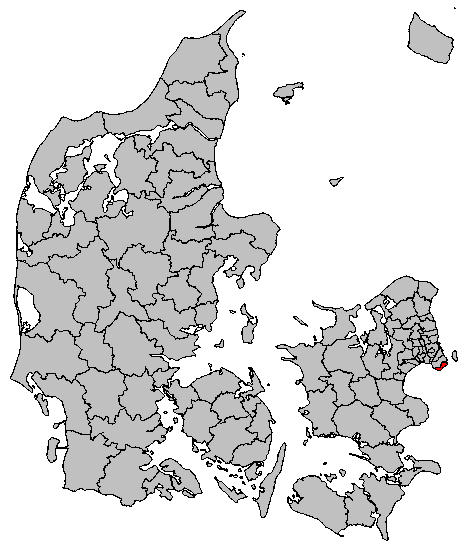
- Coordinates: 55°35′39″N 12°40′13″E
- Country: Denmark
- Region: Hovedstaden
- Established: 1 April 1974
- Seat: Dragør

Government
  - Mayor: Kenneth Gøtterup (V)

Area
  - Total: 18.41 km^{2} (7.11 sq mi)

Population (1 January 2026)
  - Total: 14,474
  - Density: 786.2/km^{2} (2,036/sq mi)
- Time zone: UTC+1 (CET)
  - Summer (DST): UTC+2 (CEST)
- Postal code: 2791
- Municipal code: 155
- Website: www.dragoer.dk

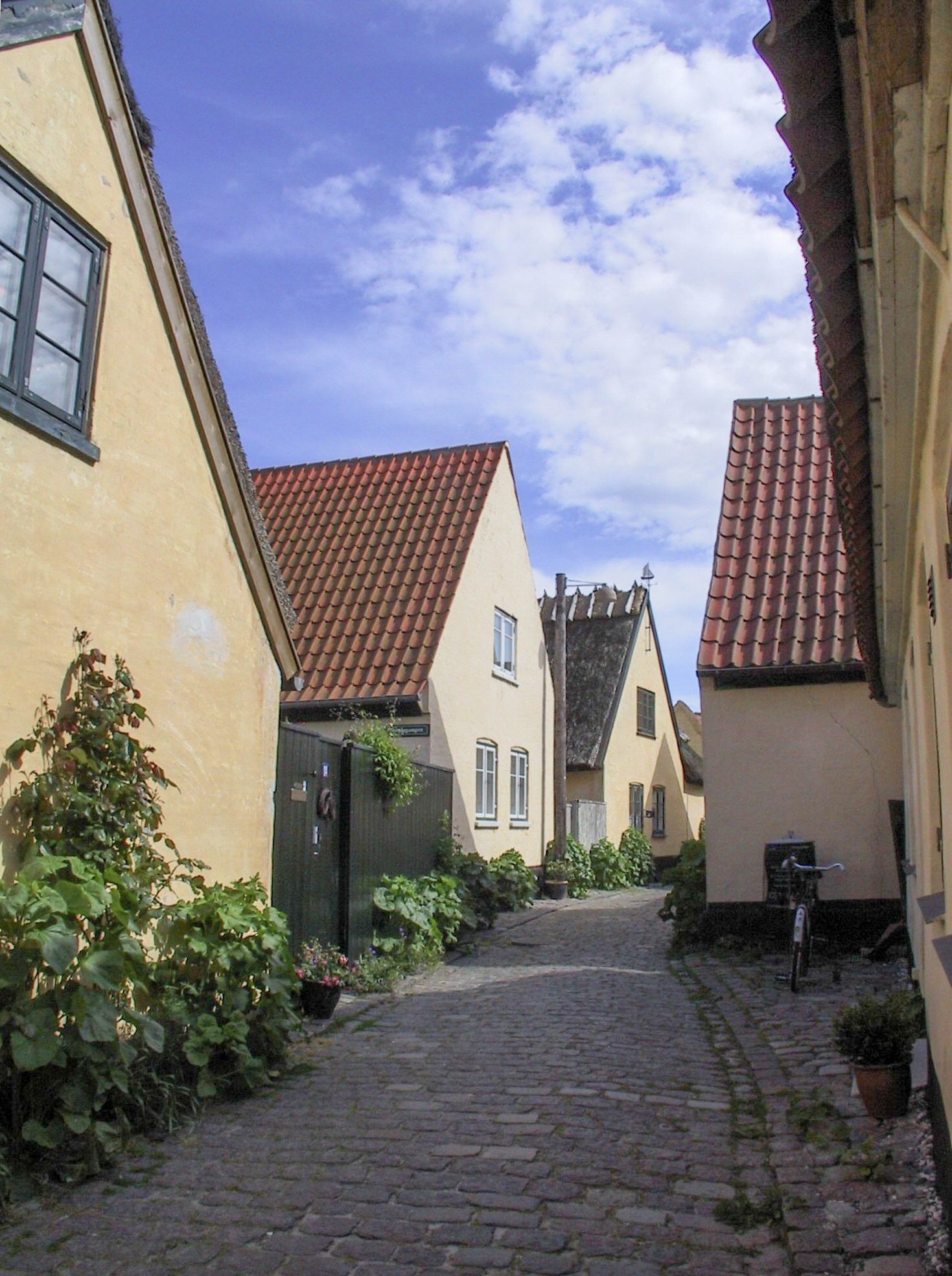
A narrow street in Dragør

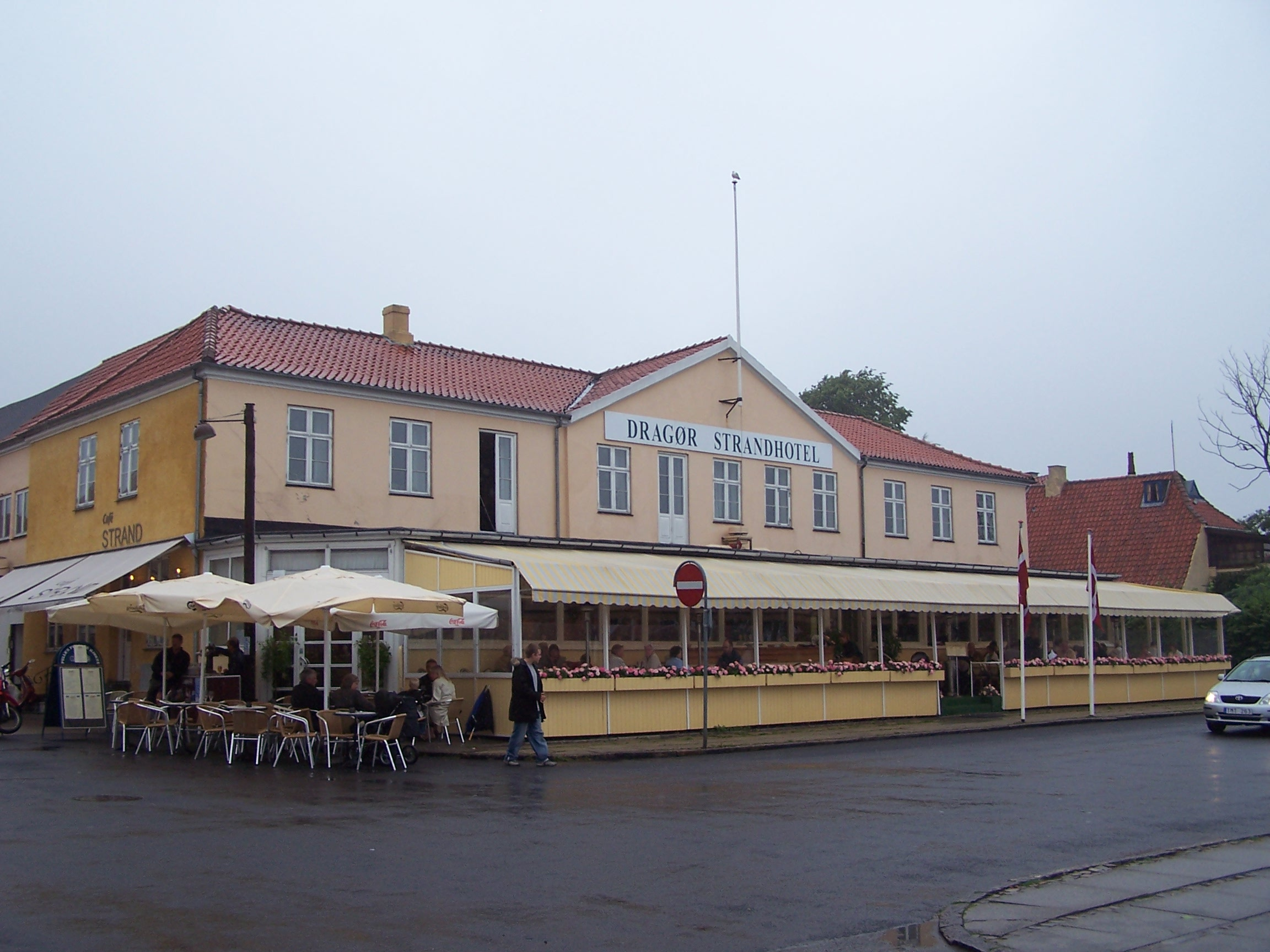
The Dragør Strand Hotel in Amager's historic old town of Dragør.

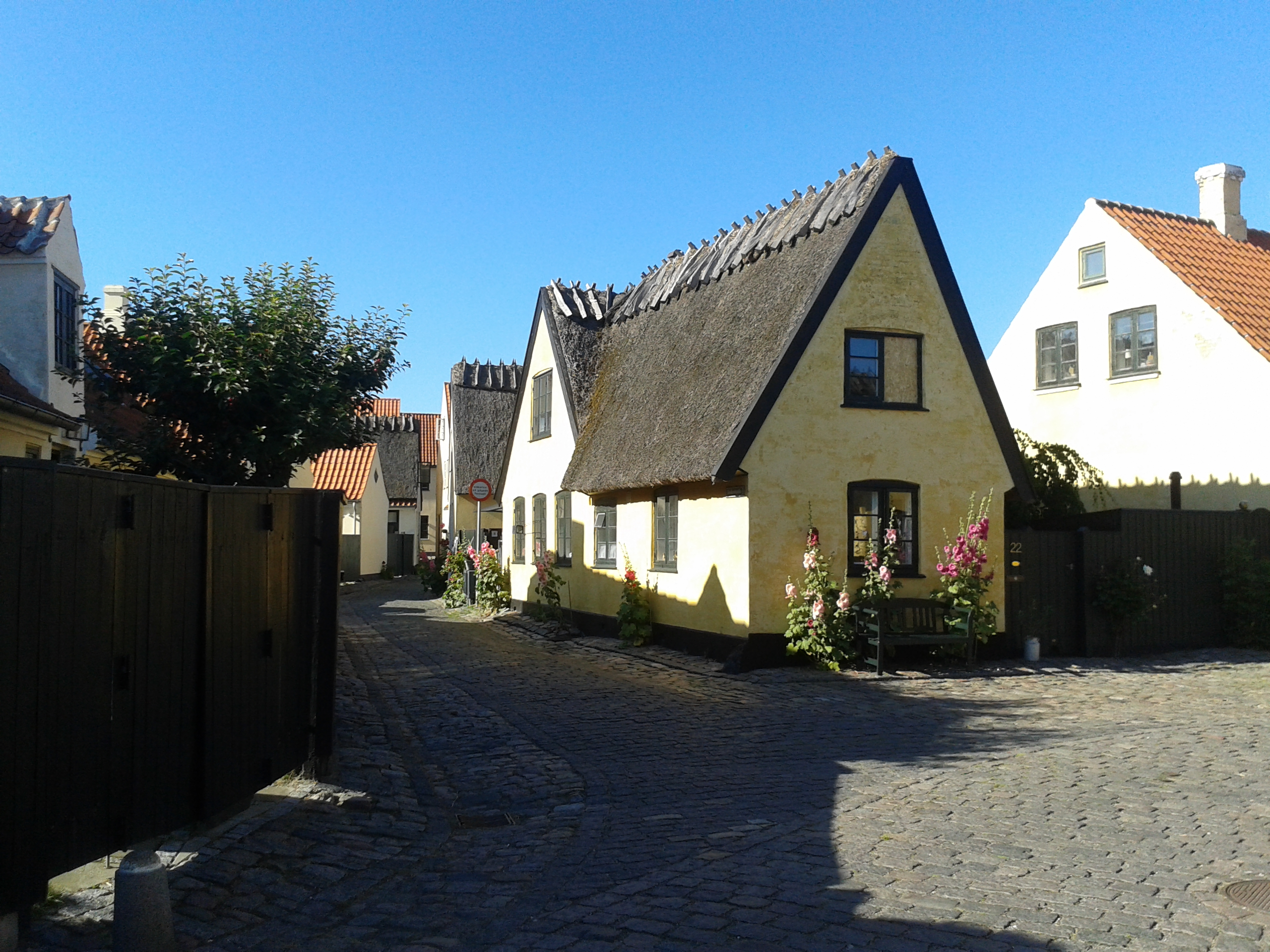
A house with a thatch roof in the city centre

Dragør Kommune (Danish pronunciation: [ˈtʁɑːwˌøɐ̯ˀ kʰoˈmuːnə]) is a municipality (Danish, kommune) in Region Hovedstaden on the southern coast of the island of Amager just east of Zealand (Sjælland) in eastern Denmark. The municipality covers an area of 18.41 km^{2} (2013), and has a population of 14,474 (1 January 2026). Its mayor is Kenneth Gøtterup, a member of the conservative party Conservative People's Party (Denmark).

== 1970 Danish Municipal Reform ==
Not until four years after the 1970 Danish Municipal Reform on 1 April 1974 two new municipalities were formed in Copenhagen County, namely Dragør Municipality, formed by the merger of Dragør (an independent parish from 1 April 1954) and Store Magleby parishes and Høje-Taastrup Municipality, which from that date also included Sengeløse parish (which - as an already existing parish - was also made an independent municipality from 1 April 1970 until 31 March 1974; but it was considered too small to remain as an independent municipality). The inhabitants would have preferred to remain as independent municipalities. Store Magleby, which was larger in area than Dragør, had a large number of subdivisions (Danish (singular): parcel;udstykning) with owner-occupied homes built on the boundary with Dragør (as far away from the noise as possible from planes landing at Copenhagen Airport, and taking restrictions in building regulations (inside city (built-up area) limits versus outside city limits) into consideration) before the merger. Because the voters of Store Magleby and Sengeløse were almost exclusively owner-occupiers, who voted center-rightwing, whereas Høje-Taastrup Municipality and Dragør Municipality to a large extent consisted of tenants who rented their apartments and who voted center-leftwing, there were heated debates and reluctance among the voters of Store Magleby and Sengeløse about joining the new municipalities. This was because the center-rightwing voters would be in a minority at elections for their local councils.

== Parishes ==
Dragør parish is surrounded by Store Magleby parish to the north, south, and west and the strait of Øresund to the east, and Dragør parish thus does not border the neighboring Tårnby municipality. Dragør parish has an area of only 156 hectares (1.56 square km;0.6 sq mi), 8.6% of Dragør municipality's area, as opposed to Store Magleby parish's 1602 hectares, the latter accounting for more than 88% of Dragør municipality's area. A part of Copenhagen Airport lies in Dragør municipality. With 4,144 people (1 January 1970:4,309), 29.77% of the population, recorded as living there on 1 January 2013, Dragør parish has a population density of 2,656 persons per square km (6,880/sq mi), Store Magleby parish with 9,737 people (1970:5,499), 69.96% of the population, has a density of 607.8 persons per square km (1,574.2/sq mi). On 1 January 2020 12,309 people (2010:11,573) lived in the built-up area of Dragør (includes St. Magleby), 1,739 (2010:1,713) in Søvang, 408 people (2010:237) were living in rural areas (areas with below 200 people), and thirty-eight persons (2010:41) were recorded as not having a fixed address. On 1 January 1970 9,808 people lived in the two parishes, and on 1 January 2010 the municipality had a population of 13,564 people.

== Overview ==
The main town is Dragør. The seat of the town hall is on Kirkevej 7 in Store Magleby, which easily can house such a large building.

Its only neighboring municipality is Tårnby to the north. To the east and south is the Øresund, the strait that separates Zealand and Amager from Sweden. To the southwest is Køge Bay (Køge Bugt).

Dragør Municipality was not merged with any adjacent municipality under the municipal reform of 2007, as it agreed to enter into a "municipal cooperation agreement" with Tårnby Municipality.

== Economy ==
Prior to its dissolution, Maersk Air had its headquarters in Dragør in the municipality. When it existed, Sterling Airlines had its head office at Copenhagen Airport South in Dragør.

== Politics ==
=== Municipal council ===
Dragør's municipal council consists of 15 members, elected every four years.

Below are the municipal councils elected since the Municipal Reform of 2007.

Election	Party								Total seats	Turnout	Elected mayor
Election	A	C	F	L	L	O	T	V	Total seats	Turnout	Elected mayor
2005	3	6		1			4	1	15	77.7%	Allan Holst (A)
2009	4	3	1			1	3	3	15	72.7%	Allan Holst (A)
2013	3	3			1	2	3	3	15	78.7%	Eik Dahl Bidstrup (V)
2017	3	3				2	4	3	15	77.9%	Eik Dahl Bidstrup (V)
Data from Kmdvalg.dk 2005, 2009, 2013 and 2017
