= Anne Skare Nielsen =

Danish futurist

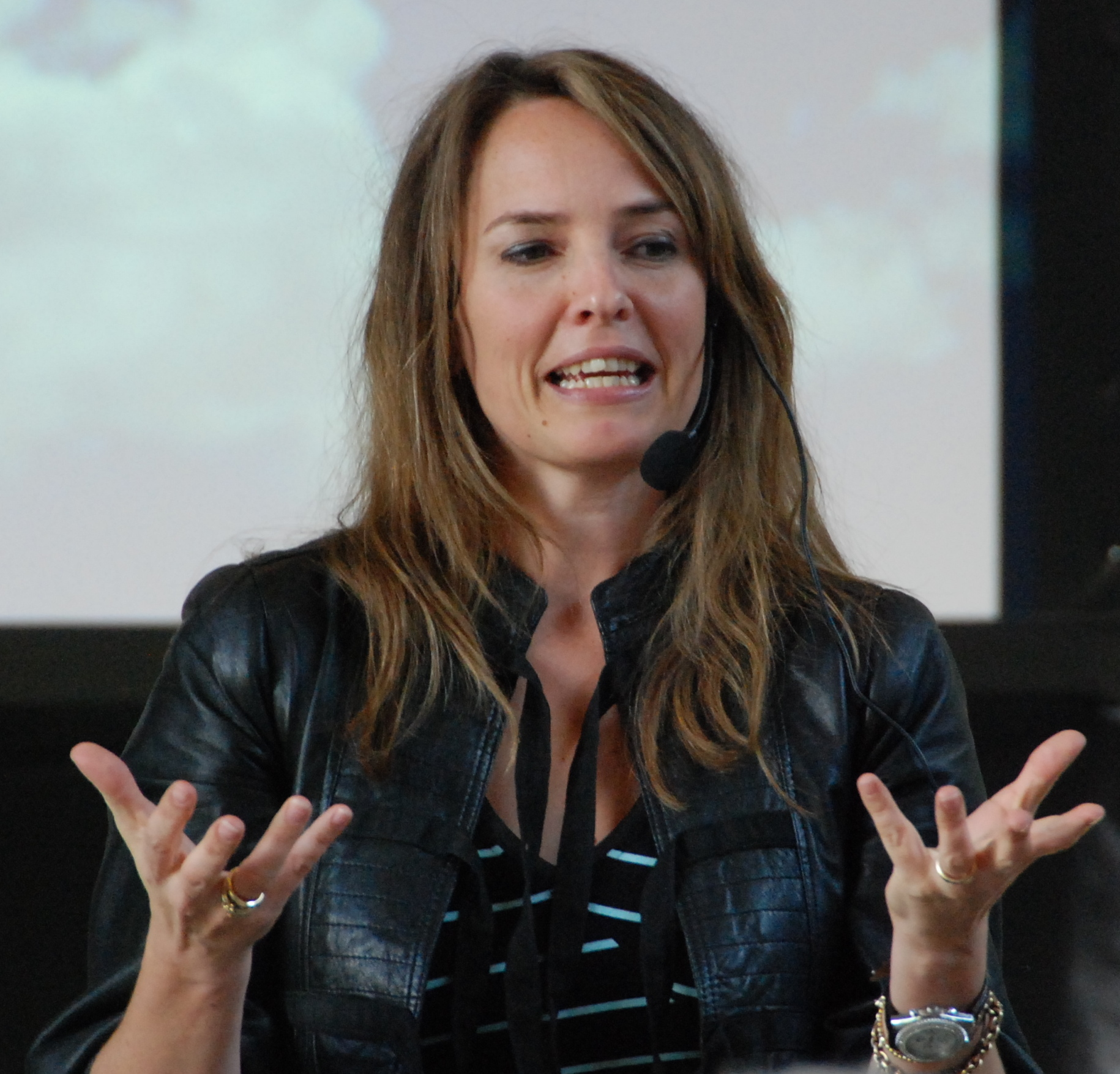
Anne Skare Nielsen in 2008

Anne Skare Nielsen is a Danish futurist, lecturer, author, and partner in Universal Futurist. From 2003-2019 she was founding partner at Future Navigator. She was born in 1971 in Vejle, Denmark.

Nielsen holds a bachelor in biology and a master in political science from University of Copenhagen. Anne helps companies and individuals predict and make the best of the future. She is the author of the Danish book "En linedans fra ide til succes". Anne acted as news anchor at "NewScience" at TV 2 News, a Danish TV channel, in 2015-2016. She was a board member of The Organic Company and Spinderihallerne. Furthermore, she is part of the advisory board at Danish Rugby Union and TEDx Øresund.

She lives in Dragør, Denmark, with her husband and their four children.
