= National Gallery of Denmark =

Statens Museum for Kunst
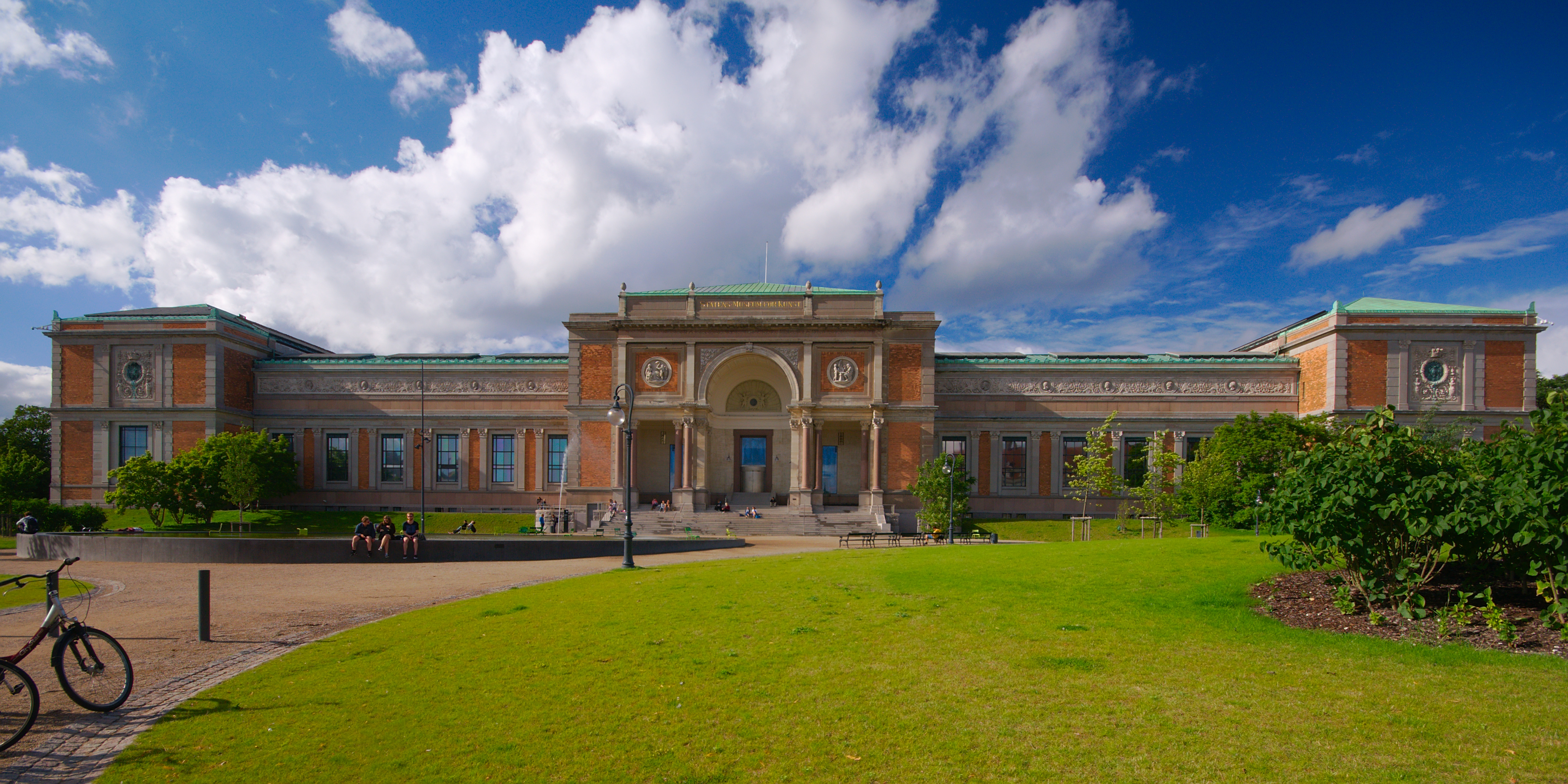
- Interactive fullscreen map
- Established: 1896
- Location: Sølvgade 48; Copenhagen, Denmark
- Coordinates: 55°41′20″N 12°34′43″E
- Type: National gallery
- Visitors: 424,710 (2007)
- Director: Astrid la Cour
- Public transit access: Bus stop: 'Georg Brandes Plads, Parkmuseerne' Bus lines: 6A, 14, 26, 40, 42, 43, 184, 185, 150S, 173 E Train: S-tog and regional train to Østerport and Nørreport Metro: Nørreport station
- Website: www.smk.dk/en/

The National Gallery of Denmark (Danish: Statens Museum for Kunst, also known as "SMK", literally State Museum for Art) is the Danish national gallery, located in the centre of Copenhagen.

The museum collects, registers, maintains, researches and handles Danish and foreign art dating from the 14th century to the present day.

== Collections ==
The museum's collections constitute almost 9,000 paintings and sculptures, approximately 240,000 works of art on paper as well as more than 2,600 plaster casts of figures from ancient times, the middle-ages and the Renaissance. Most of the older objects come from the Danish royal collection. Approximately 40,000 pieces from the collections are expected to be made available online by 2020.

=== European Art 1300–1800 ===
The display of European Art from 1300–1800 is a comprehensive collection of art over the 500-year period, featuring works by Mantegna, Cranach, Titian, Rubens and Rembrandt. The art is spread over thirteen rooms, and is the oldest art collection in Denmark, with a particular emphasis on Danish, Dutch, Flemish, Italian, French, Spanish and German pieces.

=== Danish and Nordic Art 1750–1900 ===
Danish and Nordic Art 1750–1900 charts Scandinavian art from the beginnings of Danish painting through the 'Golden Age' to the birth of Modernism. It displays over 400 works through 24 galleries. It features work by Abildgaard, Eckersberg, Købke, Ring, and Hammershøi.

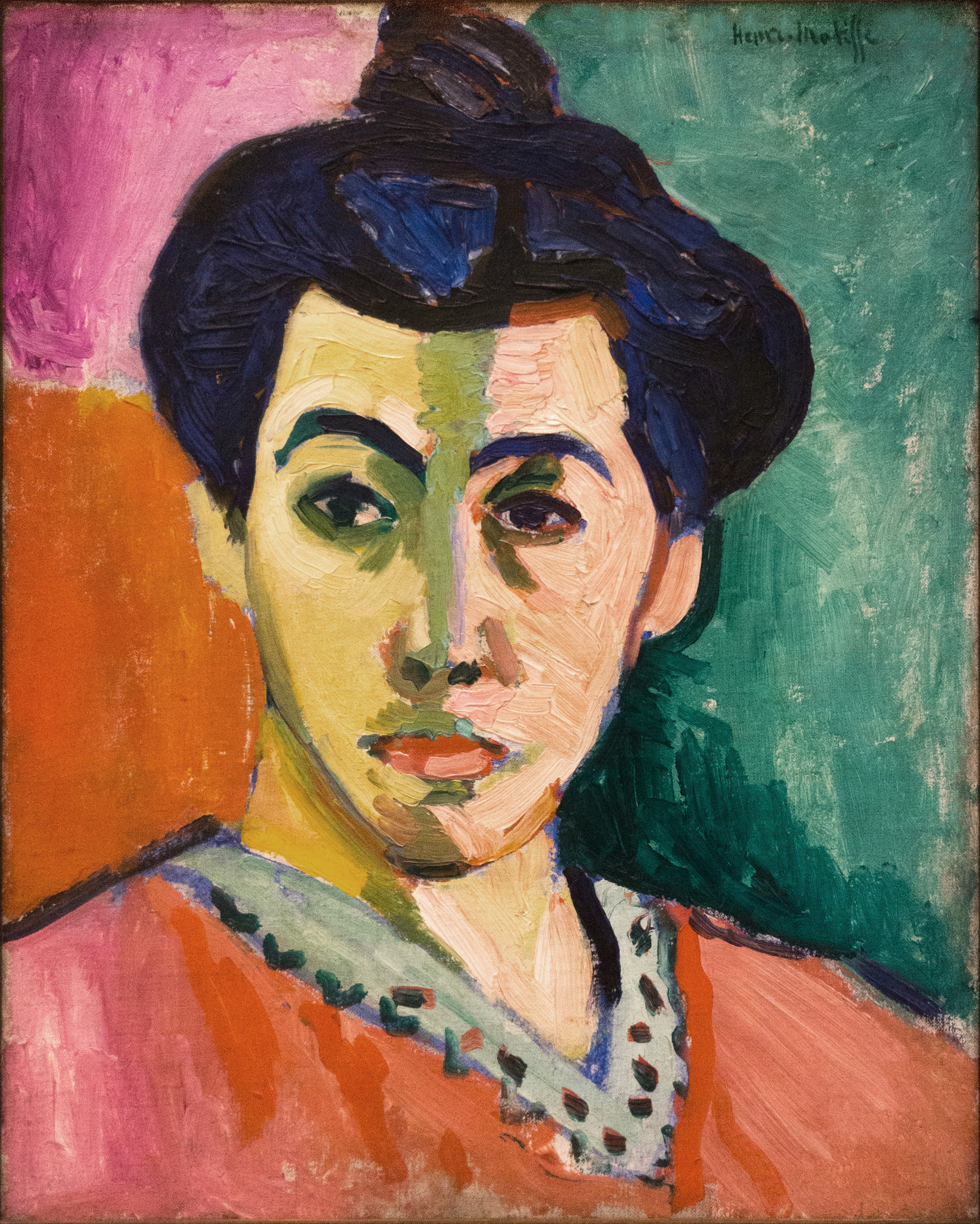
Henri Matisse, Portrait of Madame Matisse (The green line), 1905

=== French Art 1900–1930 ===
SMK gained its modern French art collection in 1928 when it was donated by the late collector Johannes Rump. This collection features some of the museum's most famous pieces from artists such as Matisse, Picasso, Derain and Braque. The collection was first offered to the SMK by Rump in 1923, but was rejected by the director Karl Madsen, as he did not believe it to be of a high enough quality.

=== Danish and International Art After 1900 ===
Housed in the museum's 1993 extension, this 20th and 21st century collection is predominantly focused on the most important examples of modern Danish art. A long corridor of paintings looking onto Østre Anlæg park works as a chronological overview of the work from this period, whilst the smaller galleries focus on specific artists or movements.

=== The Royal Collection of Graphic Art ===
The Royal Collection of Graphic Art contains more than 240,000 works: copper prints, drawings, etchings, watercolours, lithographic works and other kinds of art on paper, dating from the 15th century to the present day. The beginnings of this collection were made around the time of Christian II. In his diary from 1521 the German painter Albrecht Dürer says he has given the King "the best pieces of all my prints".

In 1843, the various works, which had so far been the king's private collection, were displayed to the public. It was then moved into the Statens Museum for Kunst when the first building was completed in 1896, along with The Royal Collection of Paintings and The Royal Cast Collection.

Although the papers contain a great number of foreign works, Danish art constitutes the main part of the collection. This collection is open to the public through the Print Room, access to which must be booked in advance of arrival.

=== The Royal Cast Collection ===
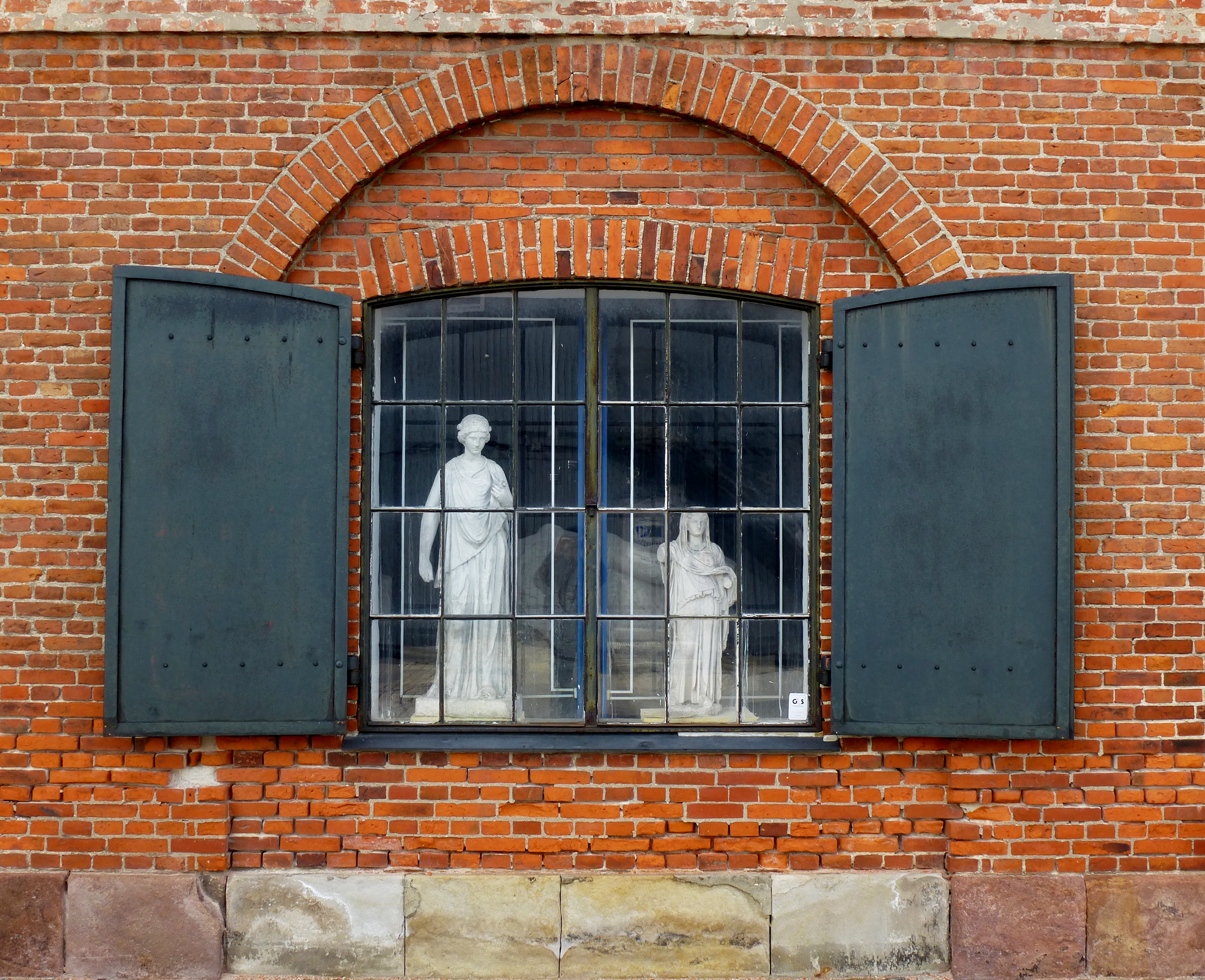
A window at the West India Warehouse

The Royal Cast Collection is held at the West India Warehouse, Toldbodgade 40, between The Little Mermaid and Nyhavn in Copenhagen. It consists of over 2,000 naked plaster casts of statues and reliefs from collections, museums, temples, churches, and public places throughout the world, from antiquity to the Renaissance. The Royal Cast Collection is only open for special events. The art was first put on display in 1895 with the intention of edifying visitors about the progression of representations of the human form over time in parallel with growing social, political and aesthetic awareness in the Western world.

At the start of the Second World War, the art of antiquity became increasingly unfashionable, associated with an archaic artistic tradition. In 1966, as abstract art became more popular, the Royal Cast Collection was removed to a barn outside Copenhagen for storage and only revived in 1984 when it was removed to the West India Warehouse.

== History ==
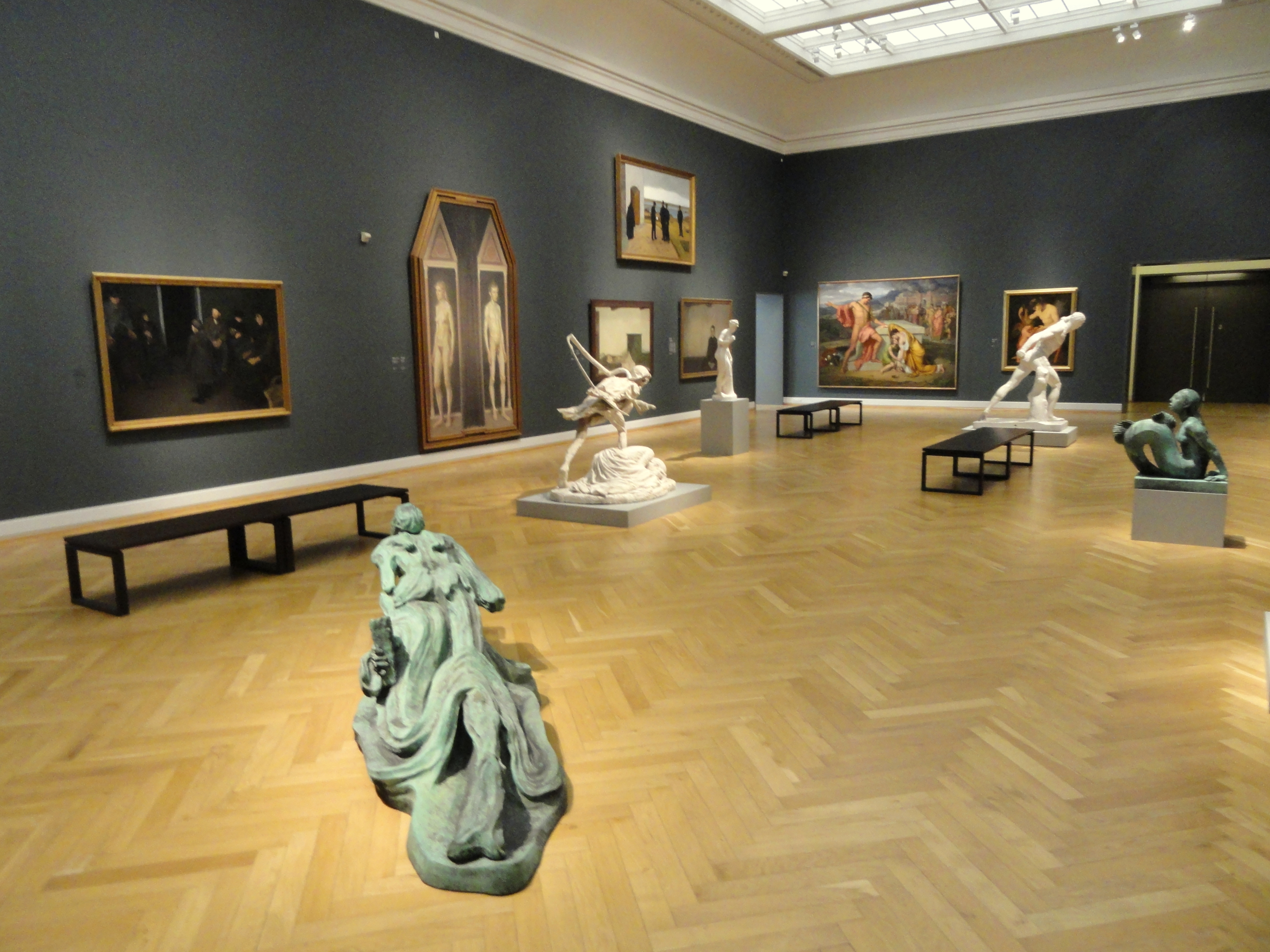
Interior – Statens Museum for Kunst

The collections of the Danish National Gallery originate in the Art Chamber (Danish: Kunstkammeret) of the Danish monarchs. When the German Gerhard Morell became Keeper of Frederick V's Art Chamber about 1750, he suggested that the king create a separate collection of paintings. To ensure that the collection was not inferior to those of other European royal houses and local counts, the king made large-scale purchases of Italian, Netherlandish and German paintings. The collection became particularly well provided with Flemish and Dutch art. The most important purchase during Morell's term as keeper was Christ as the Suffering Redeemer by Andrea Mantegna. 'Det Kongelige Billedgalleri' (Royal Art Gallery) was housed in Christiansborg Palace until 1884 when the castle burnt down. It was not until the opening of the museum in 1896 that the art had a new home.

Since then a great variety of purchases have been made. During the 19th century, the works were almost exclusively by Danish artists, and for this reason, the museum has an unrivalled collection of paintings from the so-called Danish Golden Age. That the country was able to produce pictures of high artistic quality was something new, and a consequence of the establishment of the Royal Danish Academy of Fine Arts in 1754.

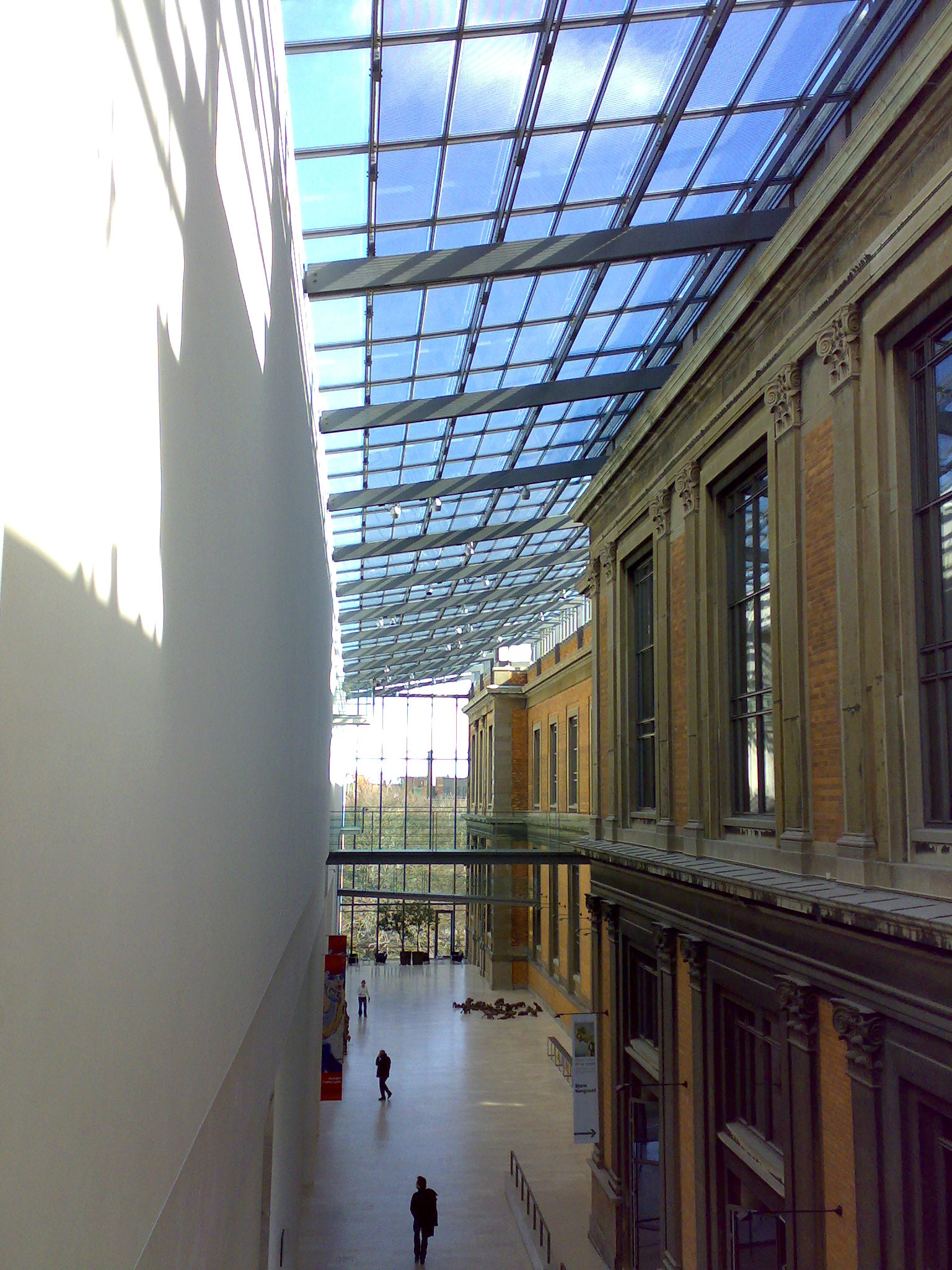
The meeting of the old and new buildings

More recently, the collection has been influenced by generous donations and long-term loans. In 1928 Johannes Rump's large collection of early French Modernist paintings was donated to the museum. This was followed by purchases of paintings and sculpture in the French tradition.

== Architecture ==
The original museum building was designed by Vilhelm Dahlerup and G. E. W. Møller and built 1889–1896 in a Historicist Italian Renaissance revival style.

Towards the back of the museum is a large modern extension designed by the architects Anna Maria Indrio and Mads Møller from Arkitektfirmaet C. F. Møller. The extension was erected in 1998 to house the extensive modern art collection. The two buildings are connected by a glass panelled 'Street of Sculptures' walkway and theatre which stretches the entire length of the museum and looks out onto the Østre Anlæg park. Talks, concerts and installations are all held in this area.

== Gallery ==
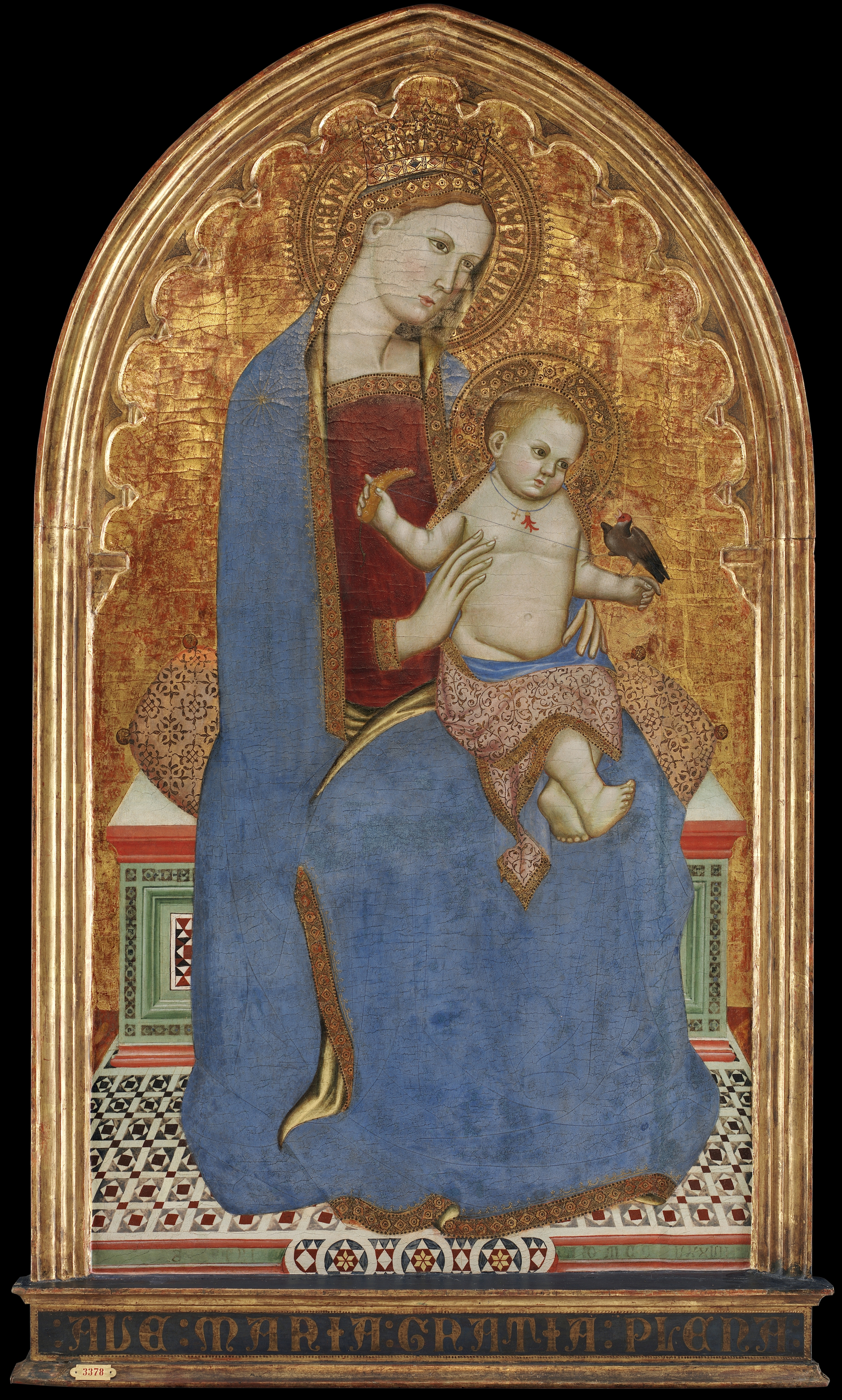
Cecco di Pietro, Madonna and Child, 1371

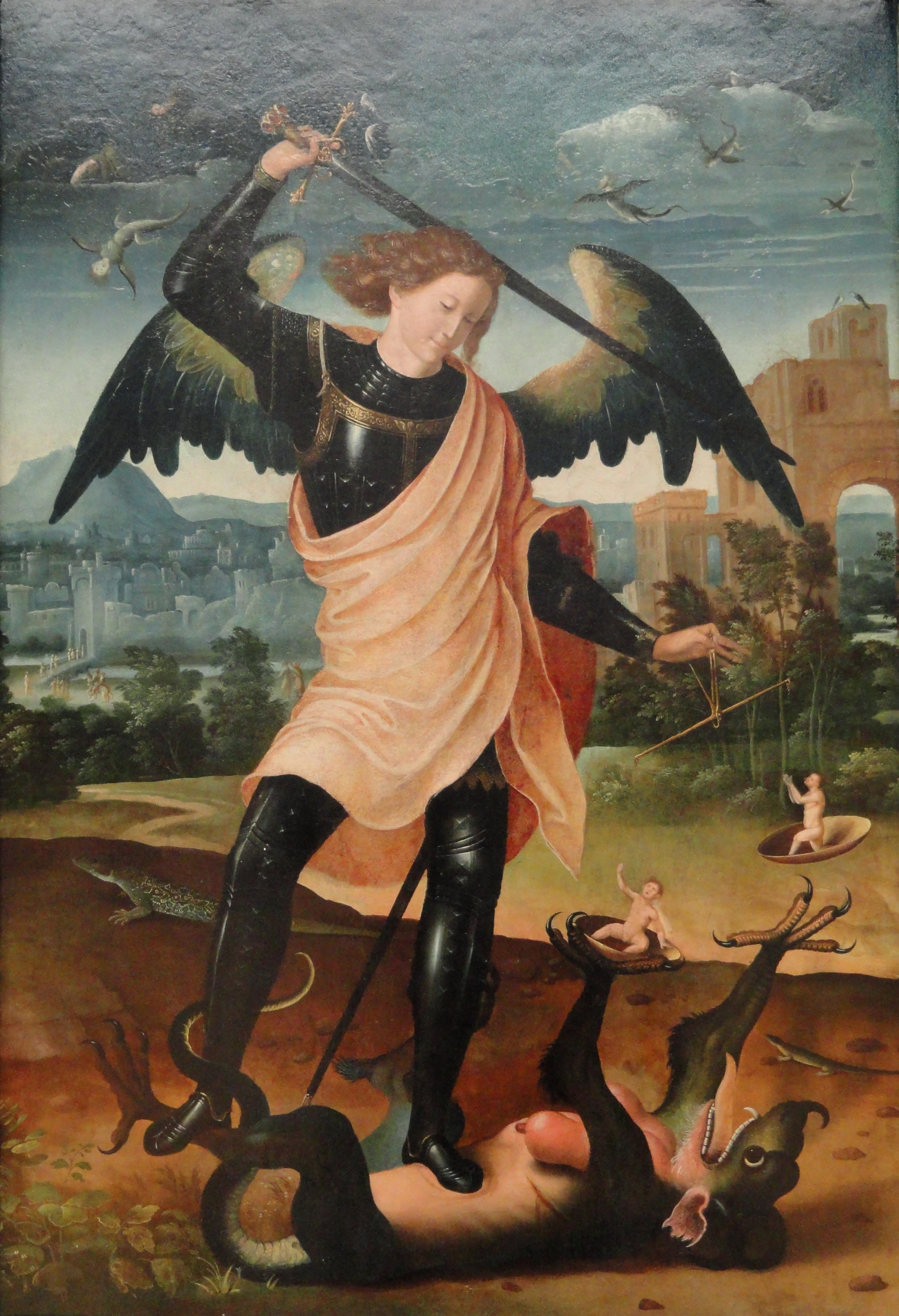
Unknown Spanish artist, Saint Michael and the Dragon

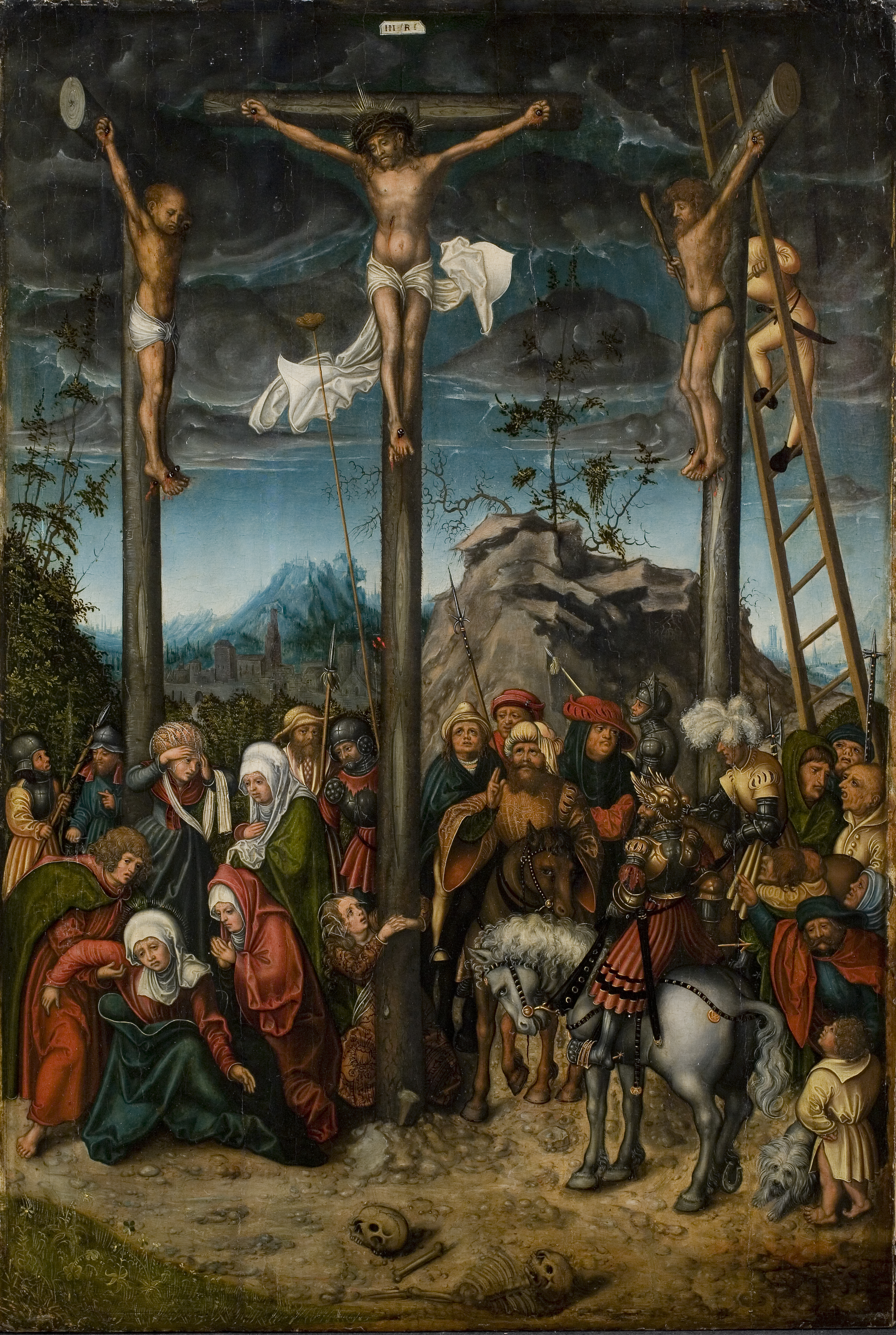
Lucas Cranach the Elder (1472–1553), date unknown, Crucifixion (Kreuzigung)

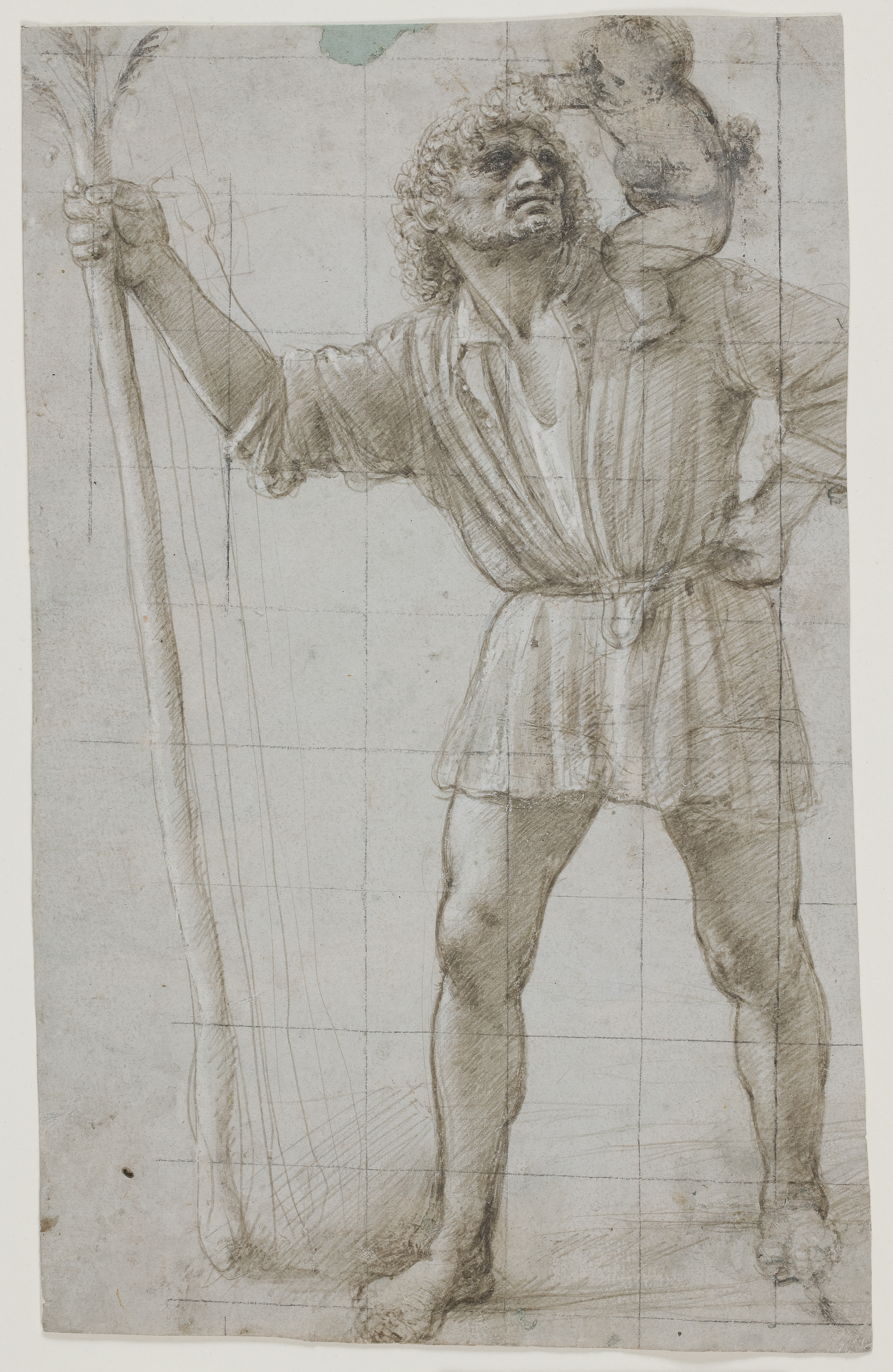
Saint Christopher, by Donato Bramante, 1490

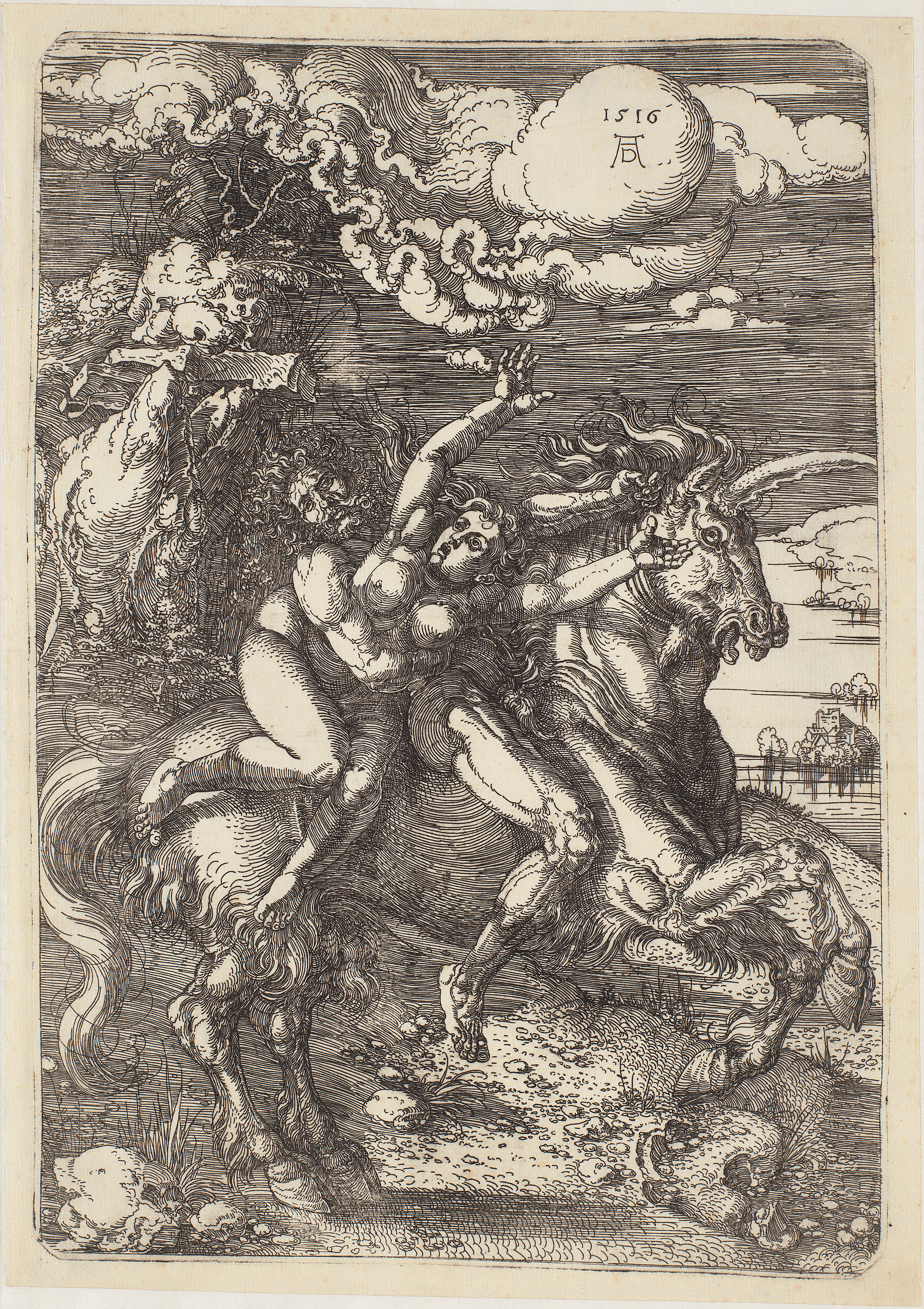
Abduction on a Unicorn, by Albrecht Dürer, 1516

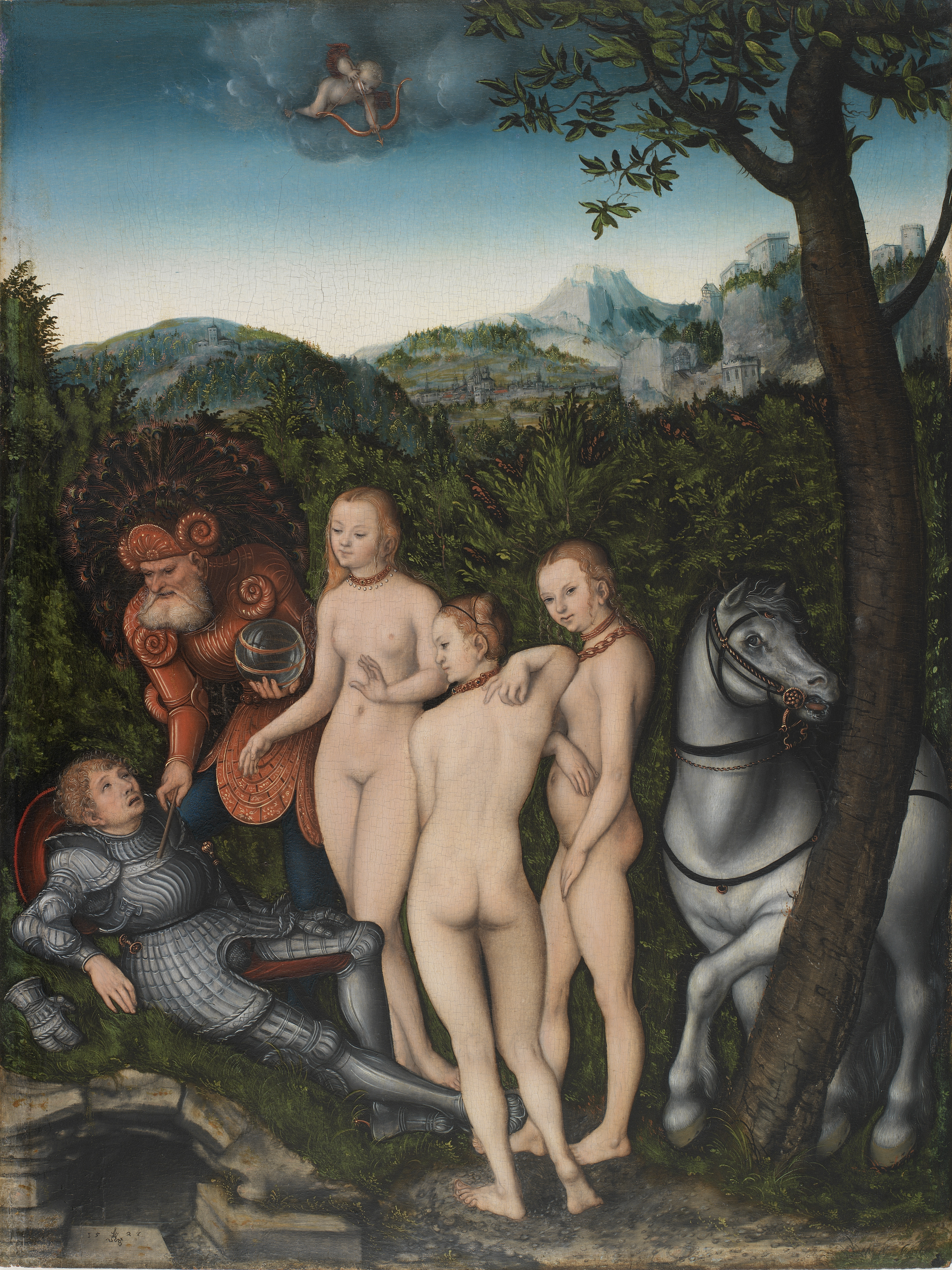
The Judgement of Paris, Lucas Cranach the Elder, 1527

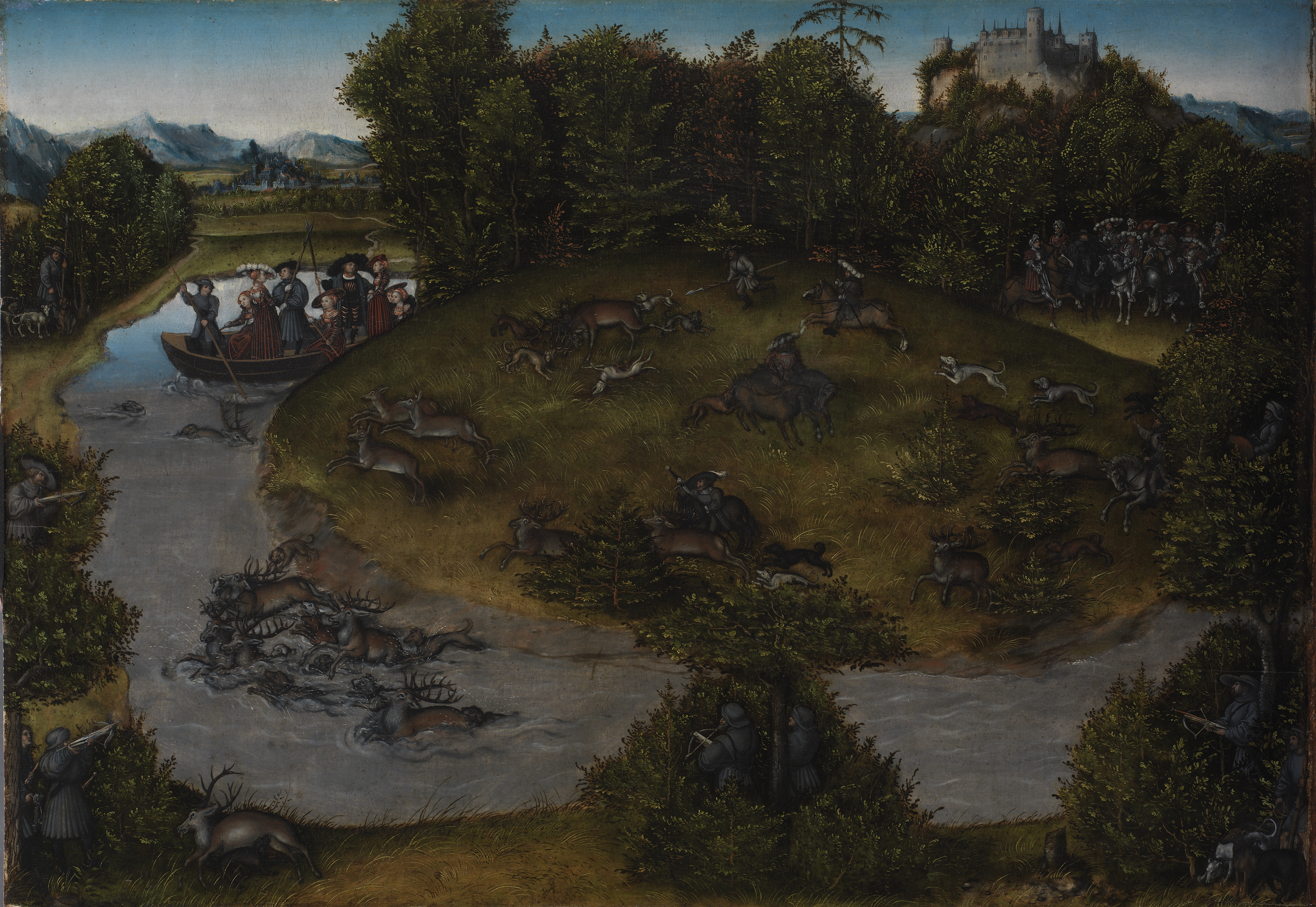
The Stag Hunt of the Elector Frederick the Wise of Saxony, by Lucas Cranach the Elder, probably after 1529

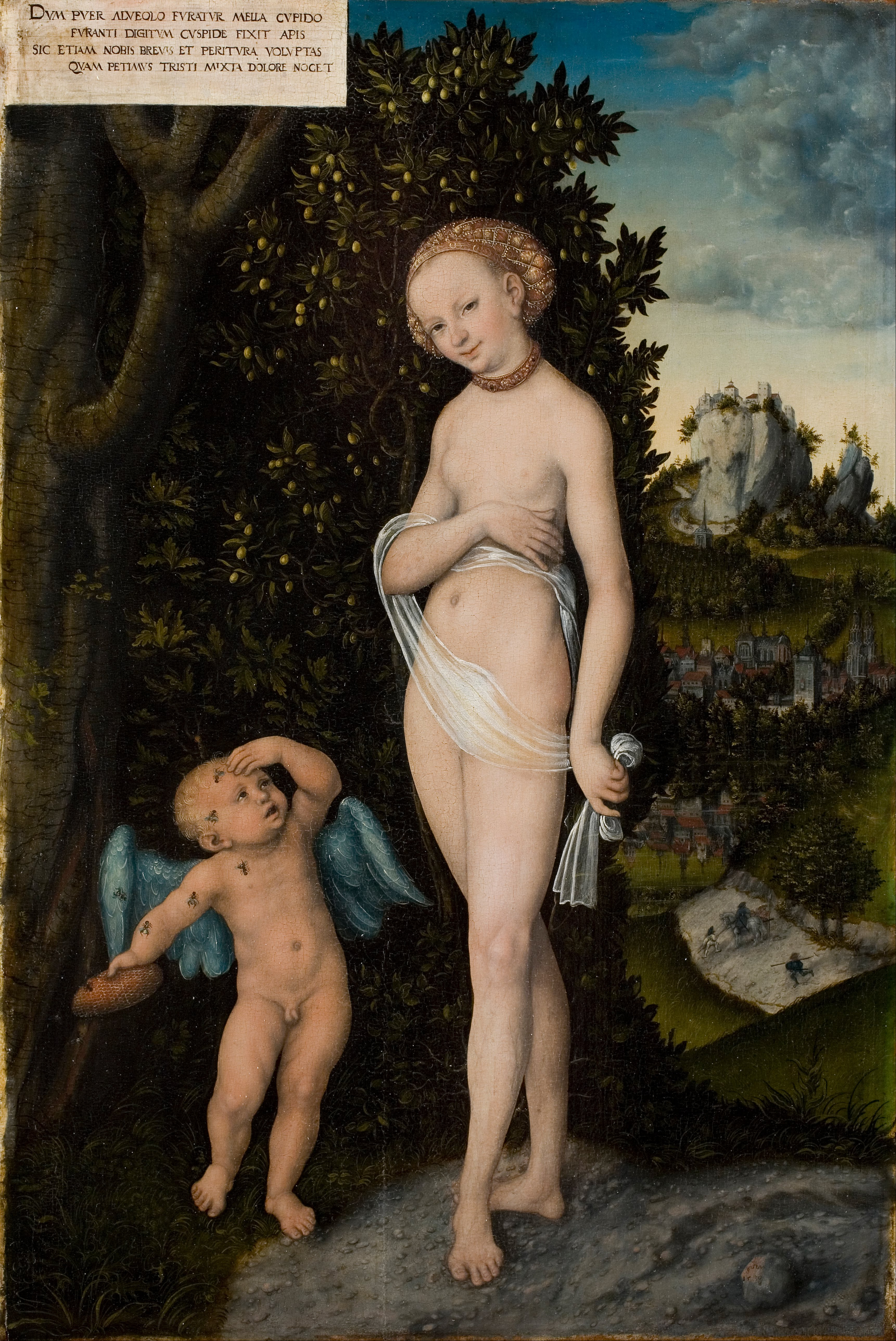
Venus and Cupid, the Honey Thief, by Lucas Cranach the Elder, 1530

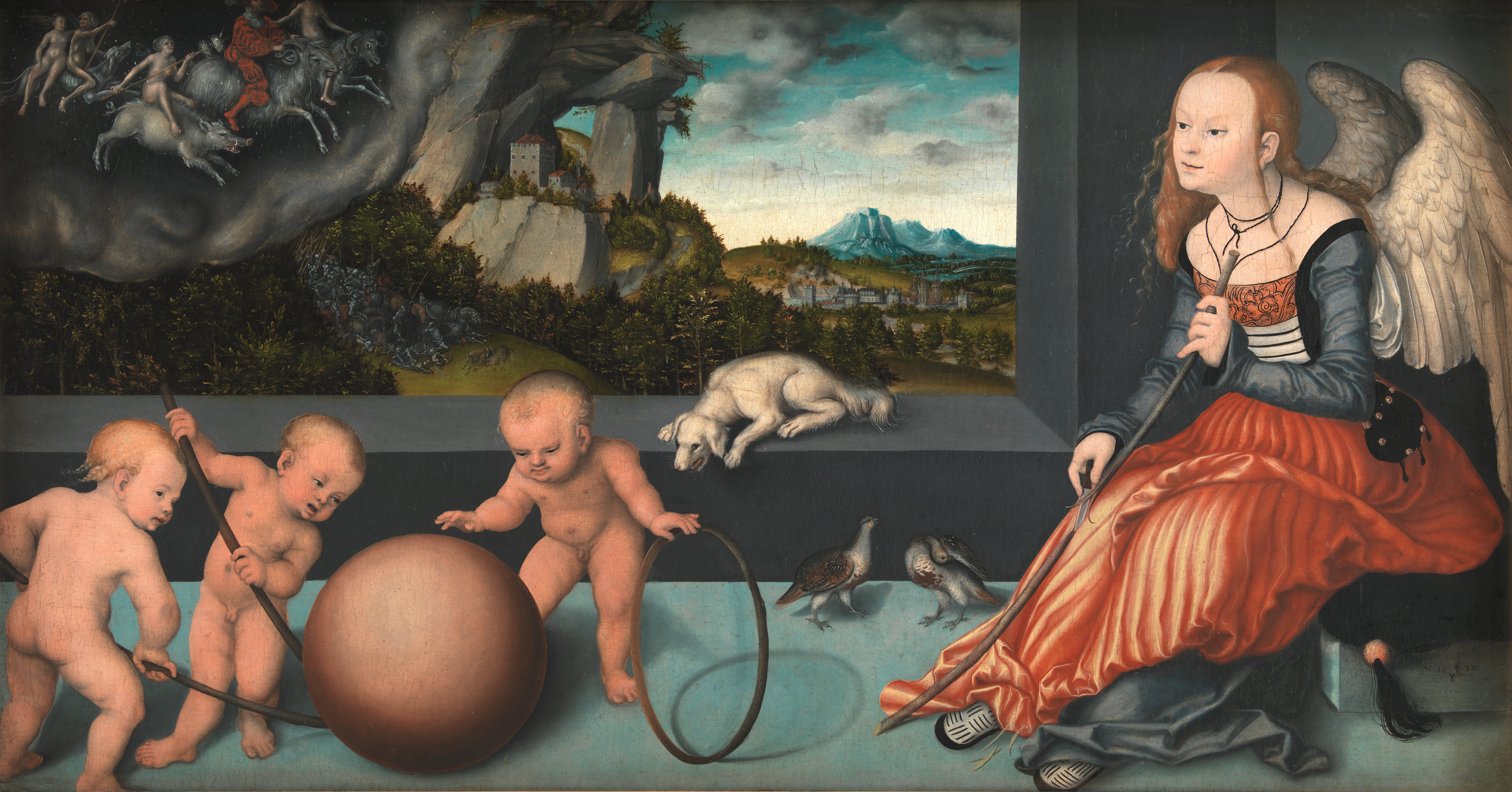
Lucas Cranach the Elder, 1532, Melancholia

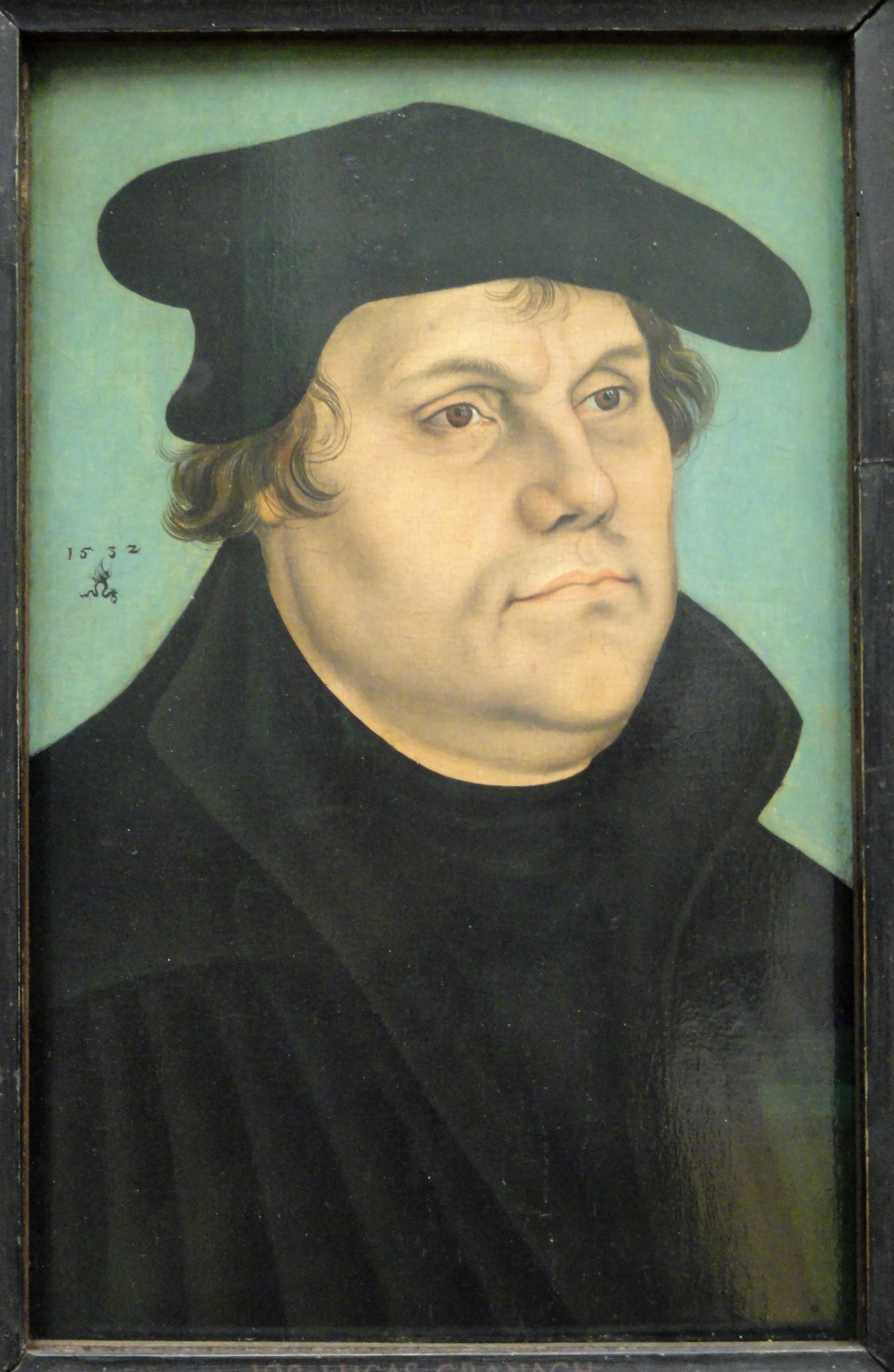
Lucas Cranach the Elder, 1532, Portrait of Martin Luther

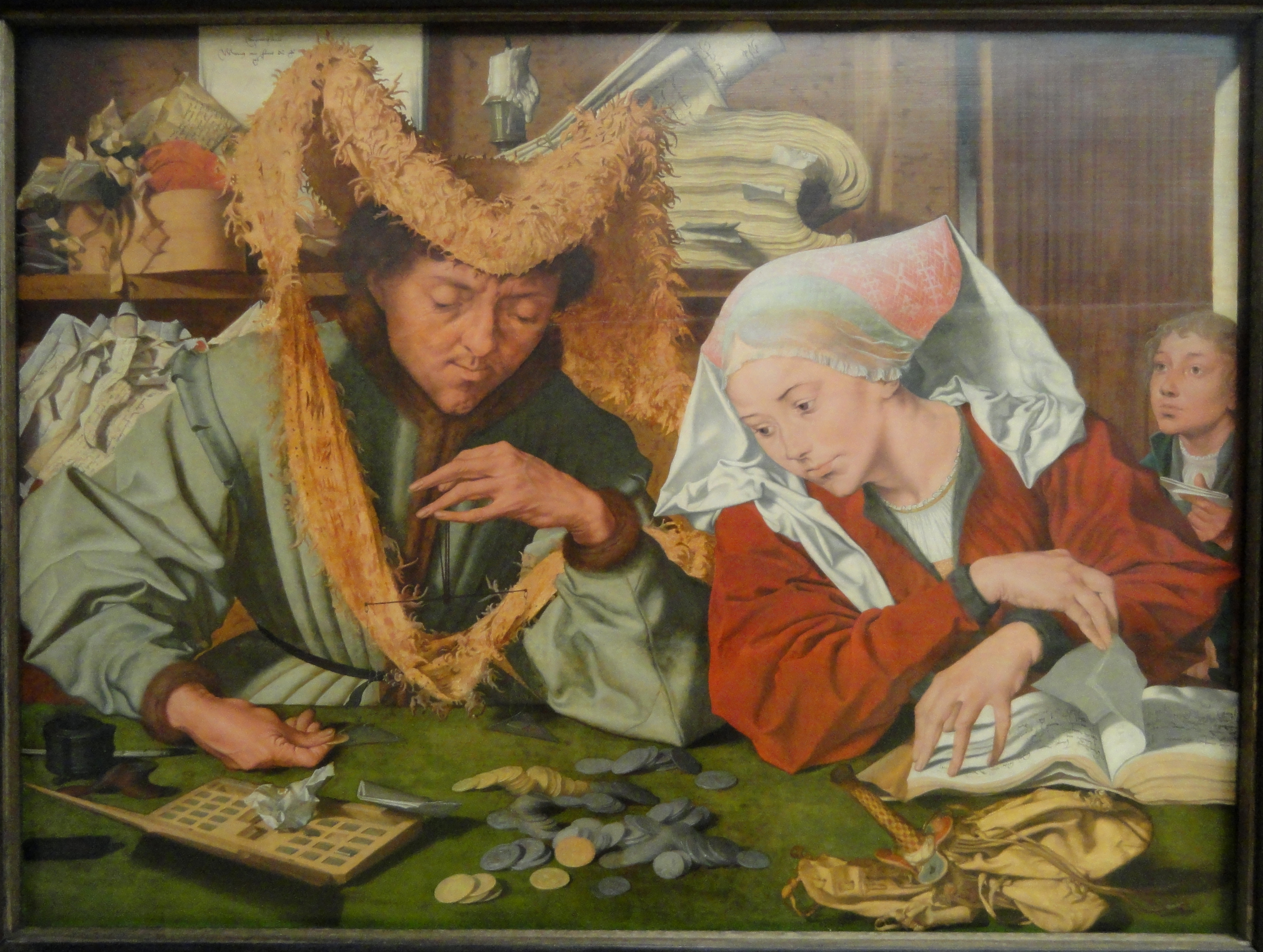
Marinus van Reymerswale, 1540, The Moneychanger and His Wife

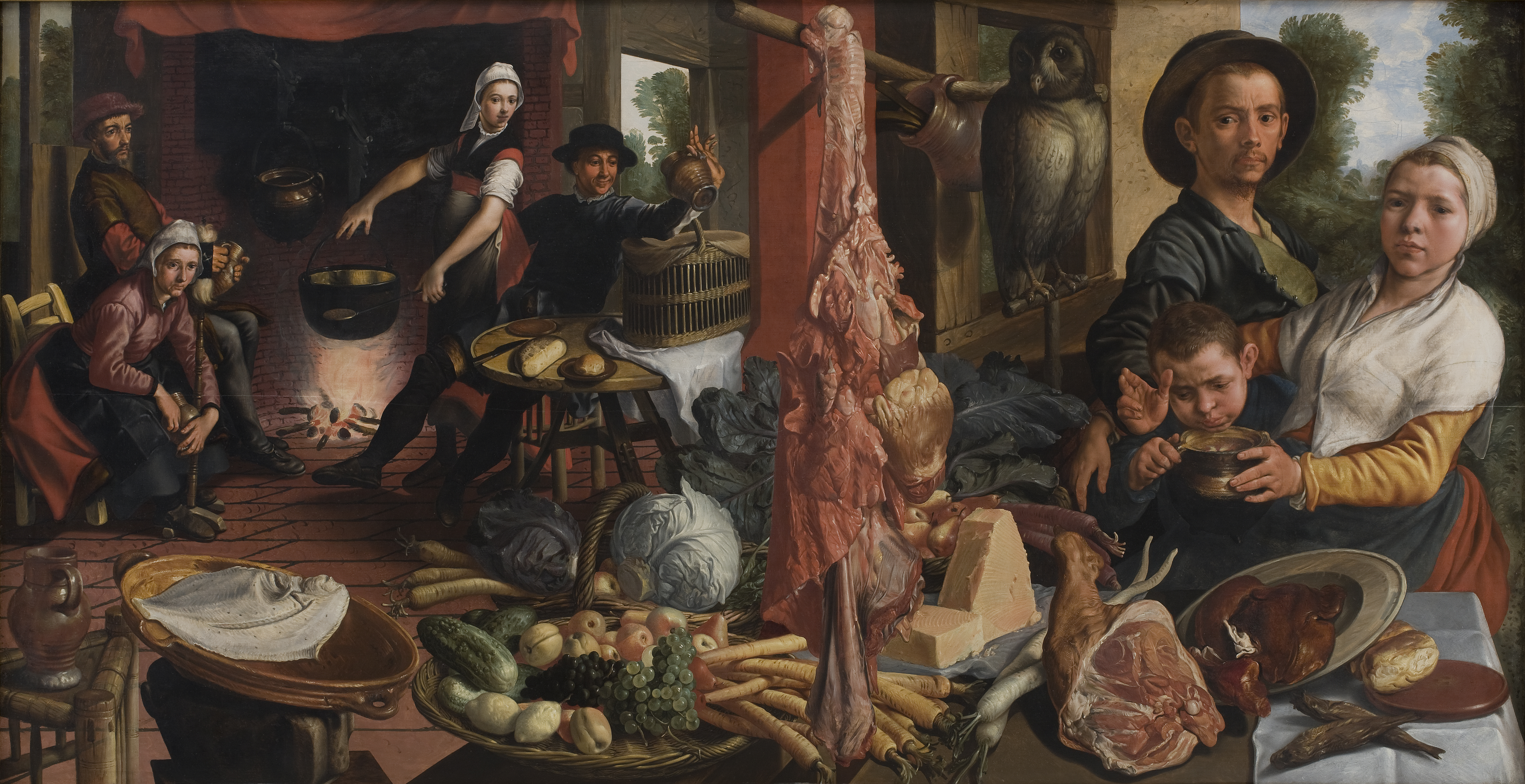
Pieter Aertsen, 1565–1575, The Fat Kitchen. An Allegory

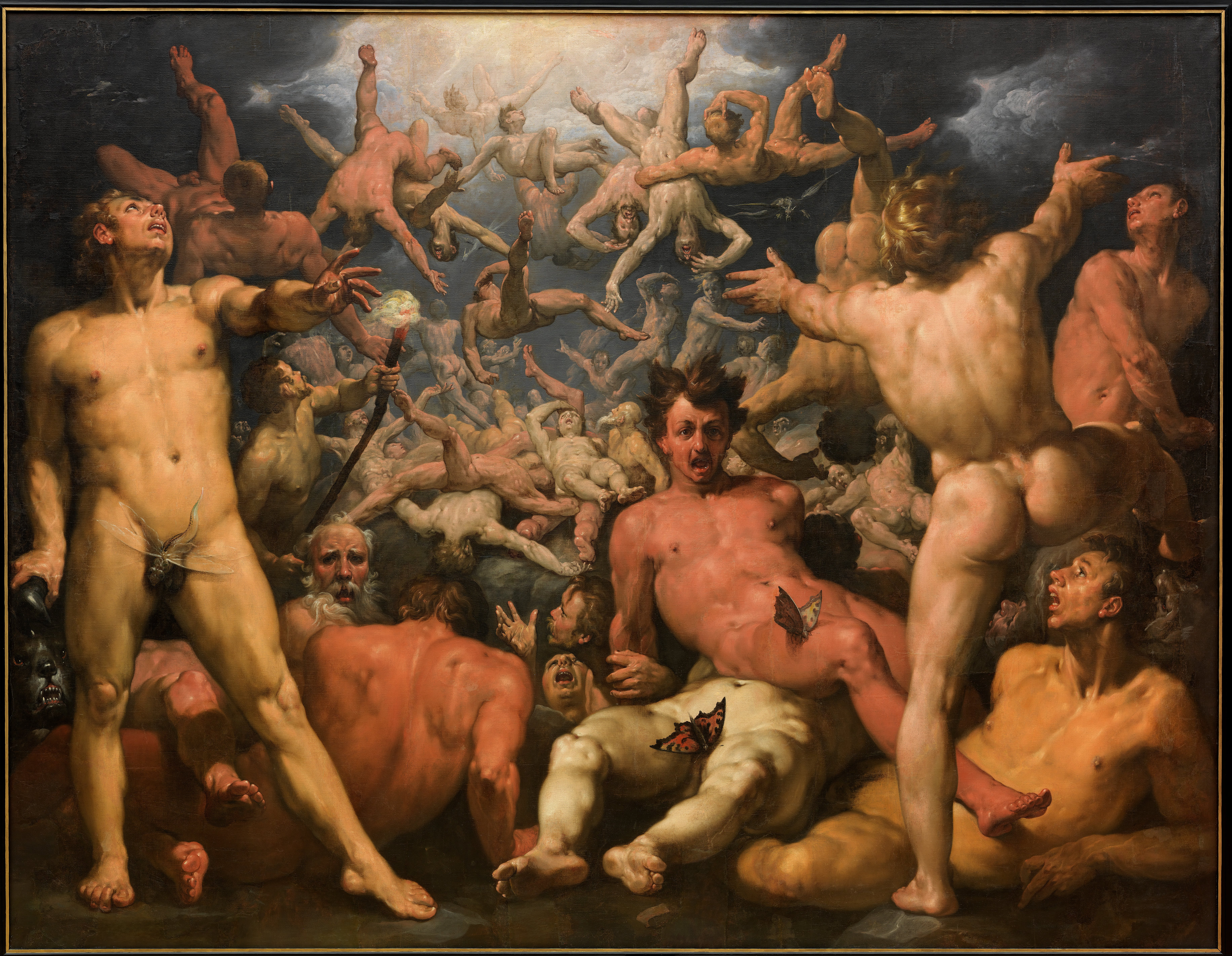
Cornelis Cornelisz van Haarlem, The Fall of the Titans, 1596–1598

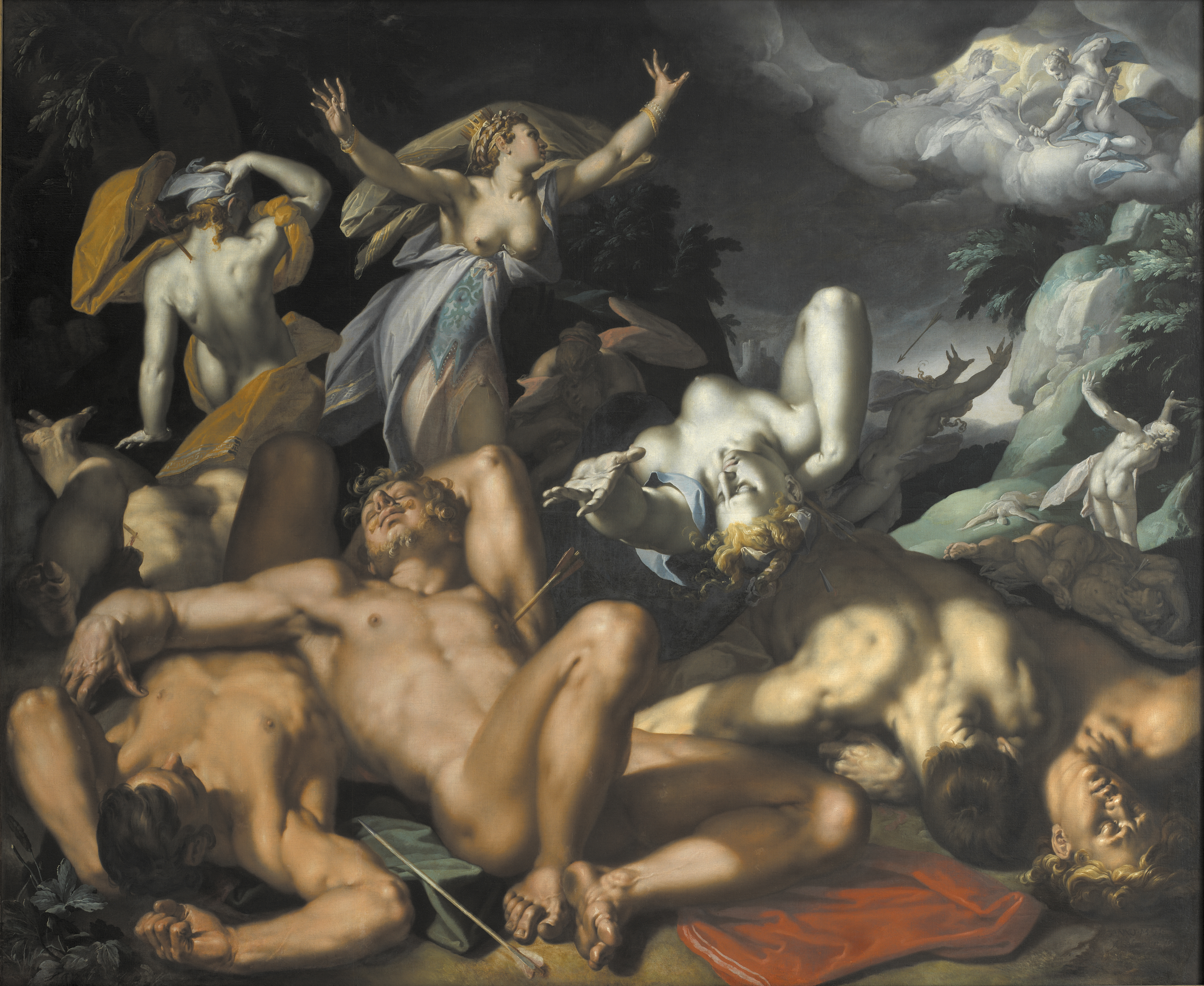
Apollo and Diana Punishing Niobe by Killing Her Children, by Abraham Bloemaert, 1591

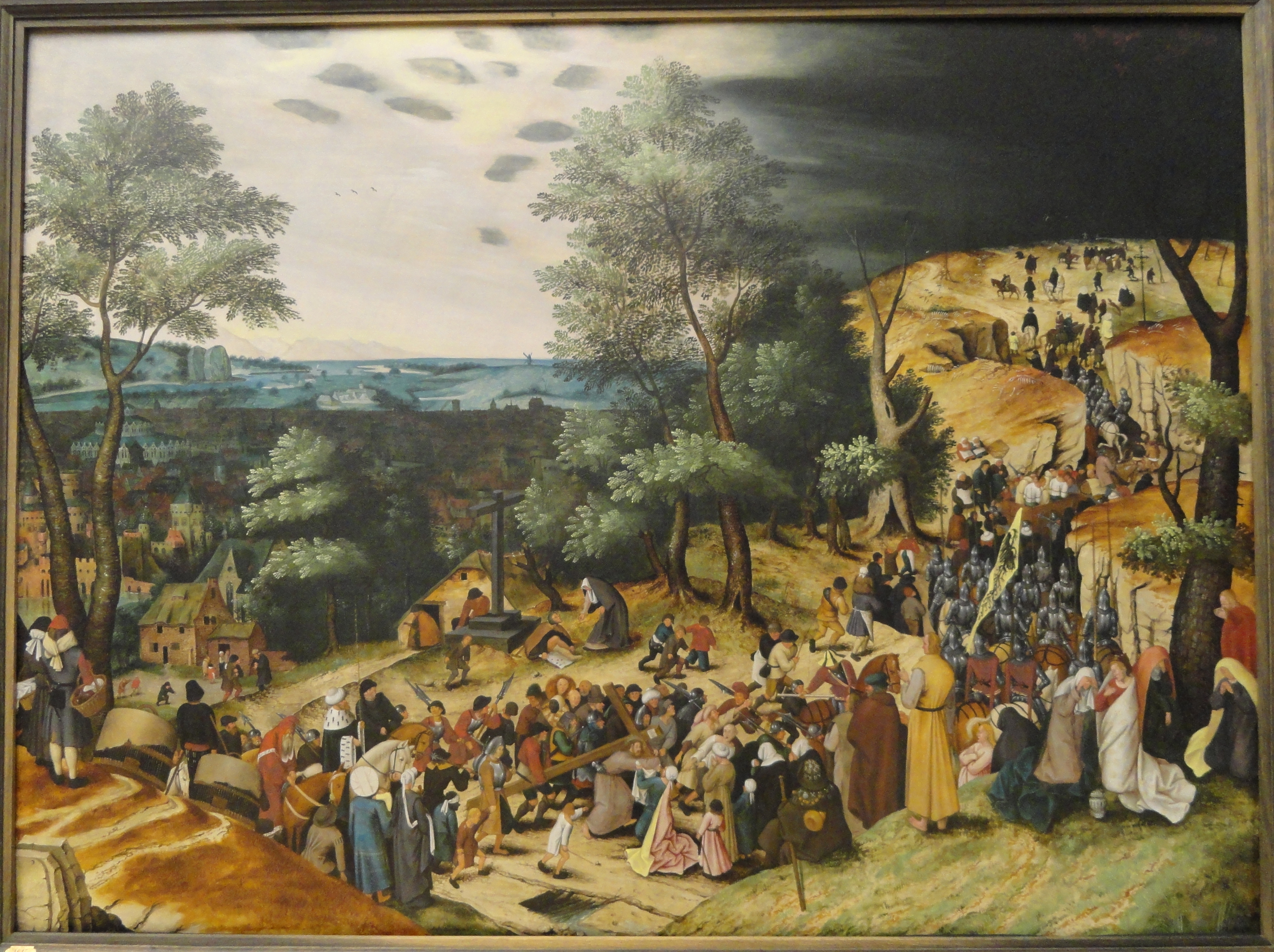
Peter Brueghel the Younger, c. 1605, The Way to Calvary

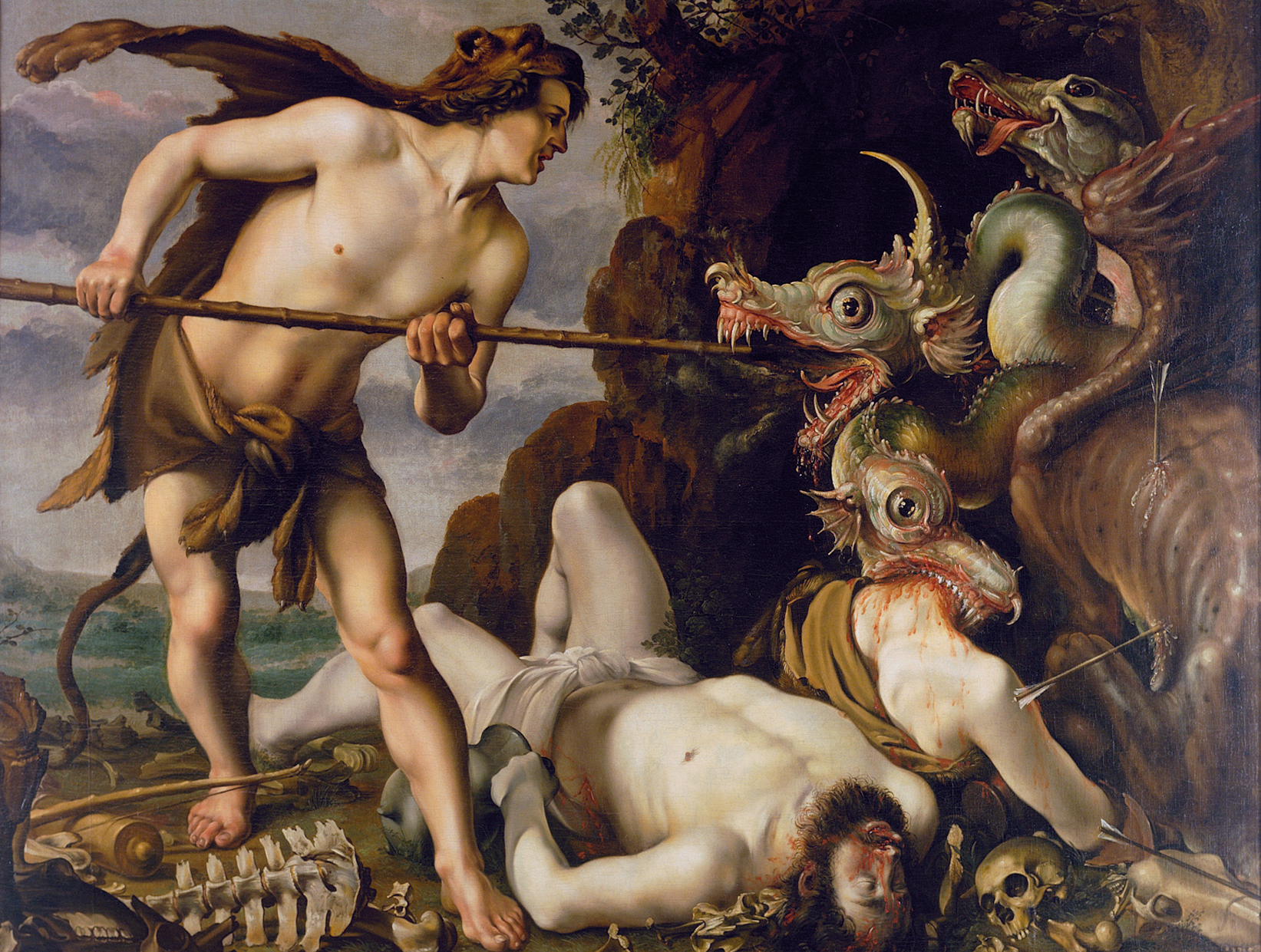
Hendrick Goltzius, between 1573 and 1617, Cadmus Slays the Dragon

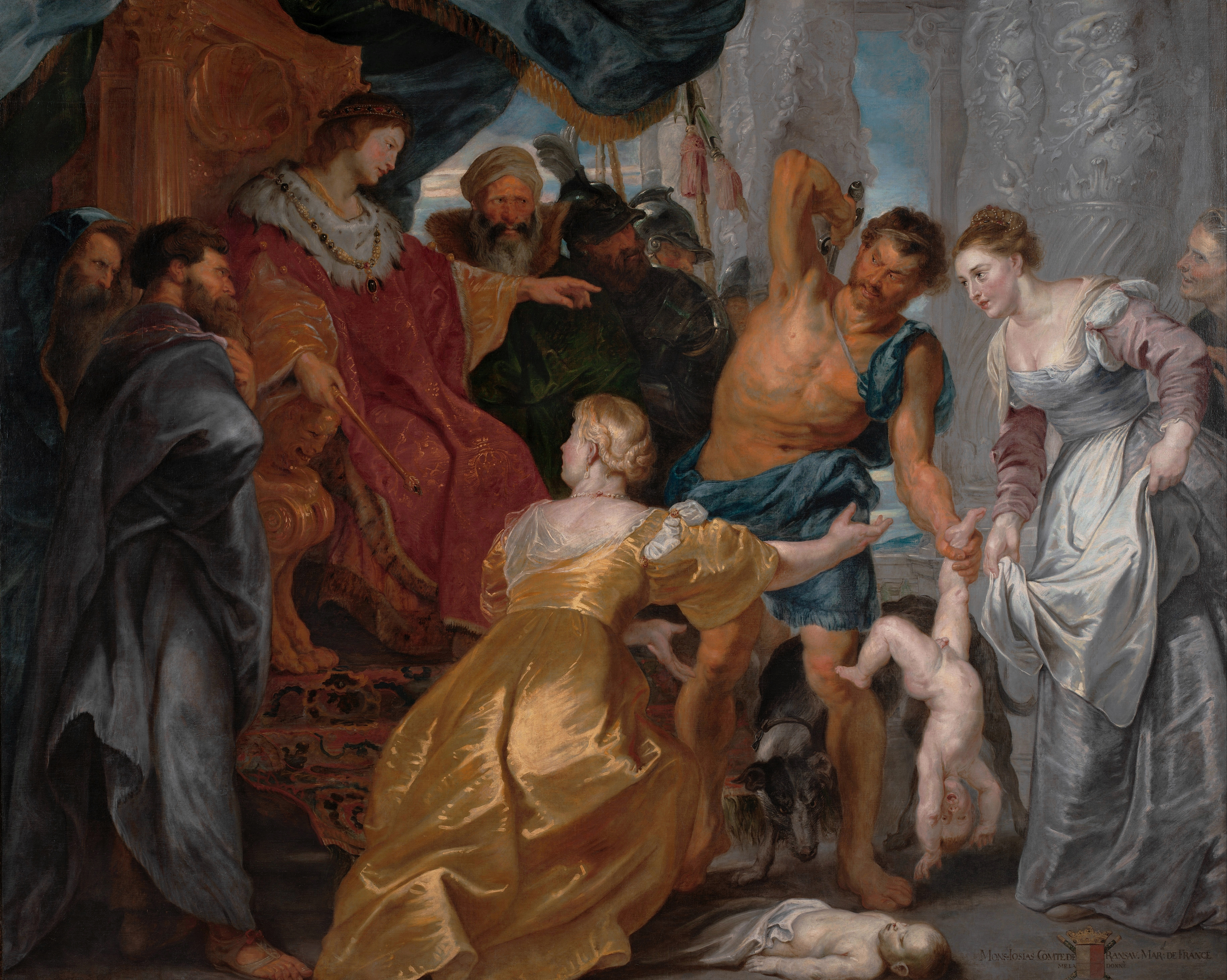
The Judgement of Solomon (1617) Peter Paul Rubens

Bouquet of Flowers in a Stone Niche, Ambrosius Bosschaert, 1618

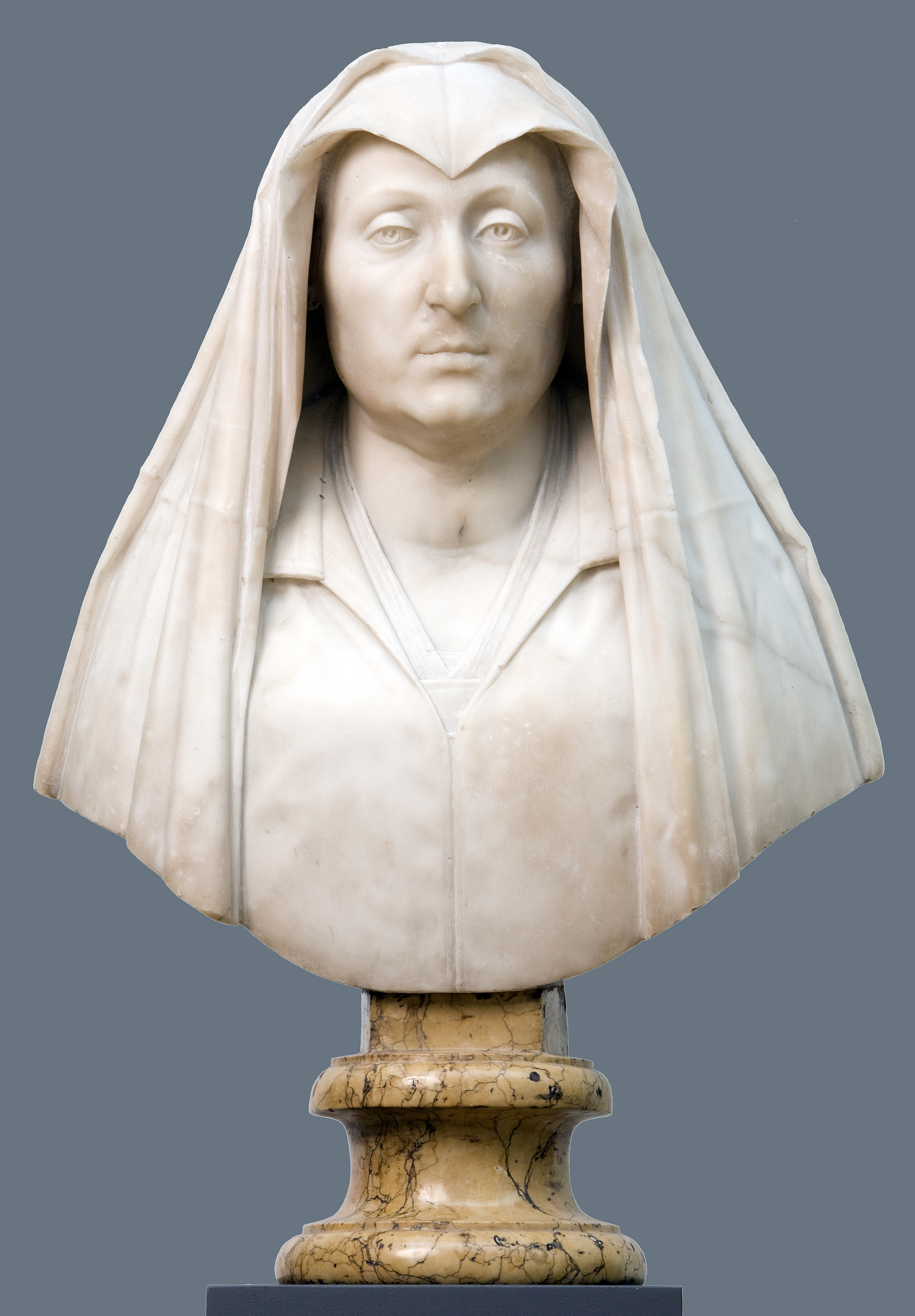
Bust of Camilla Barbadoni, by Gian Lorenzo Bernini, 1619

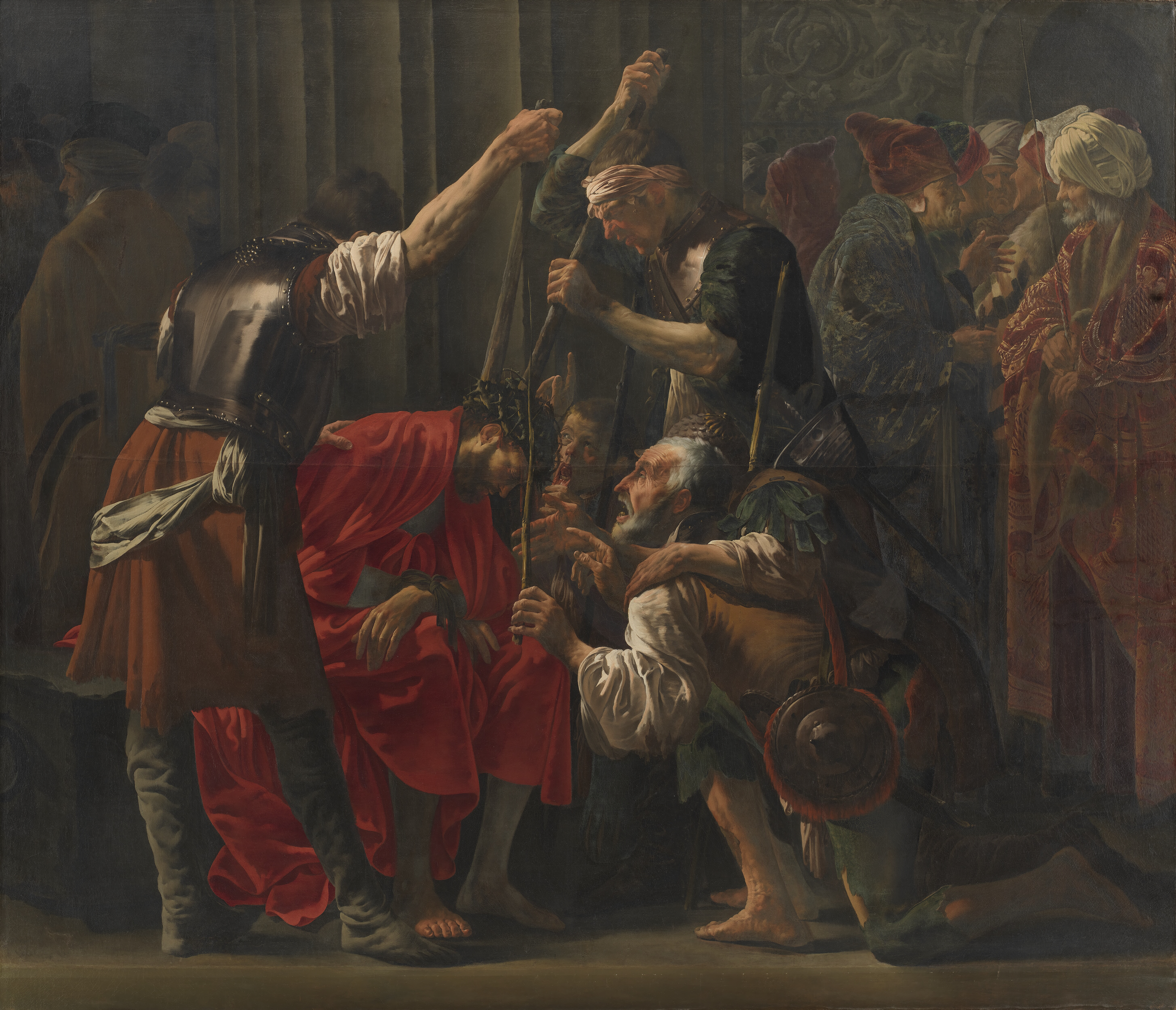
Christ Crowned with Thorns (1620) Hendrick ter Brugghen

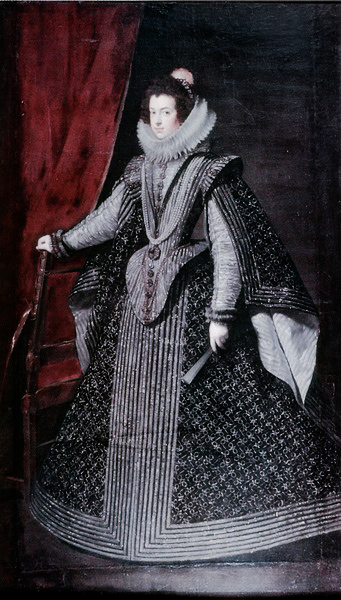
Diego Velázquez, c. 1630, Isabel de Borbón

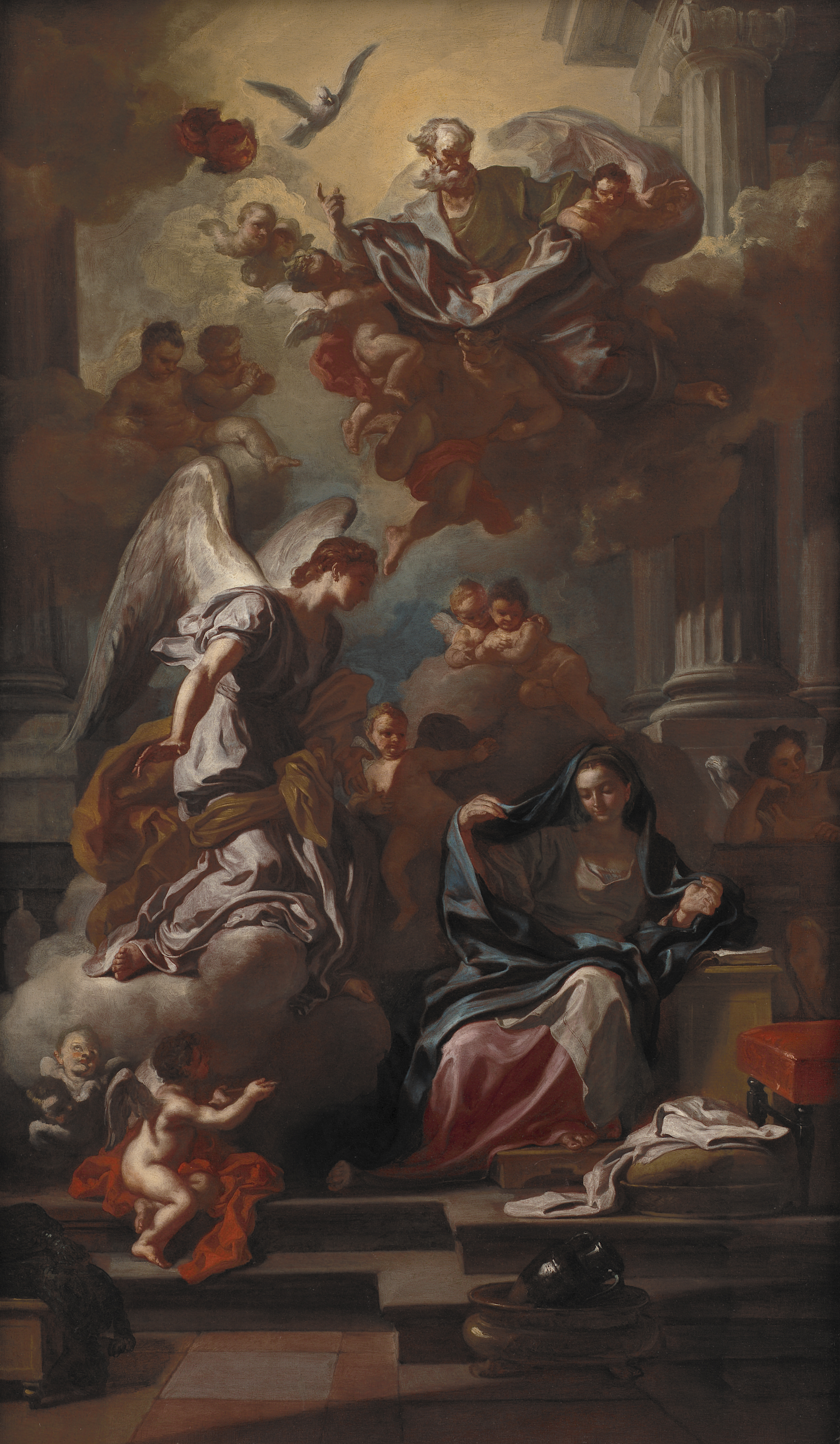
The Annunciation, by Francesco Solimena (unknown date)

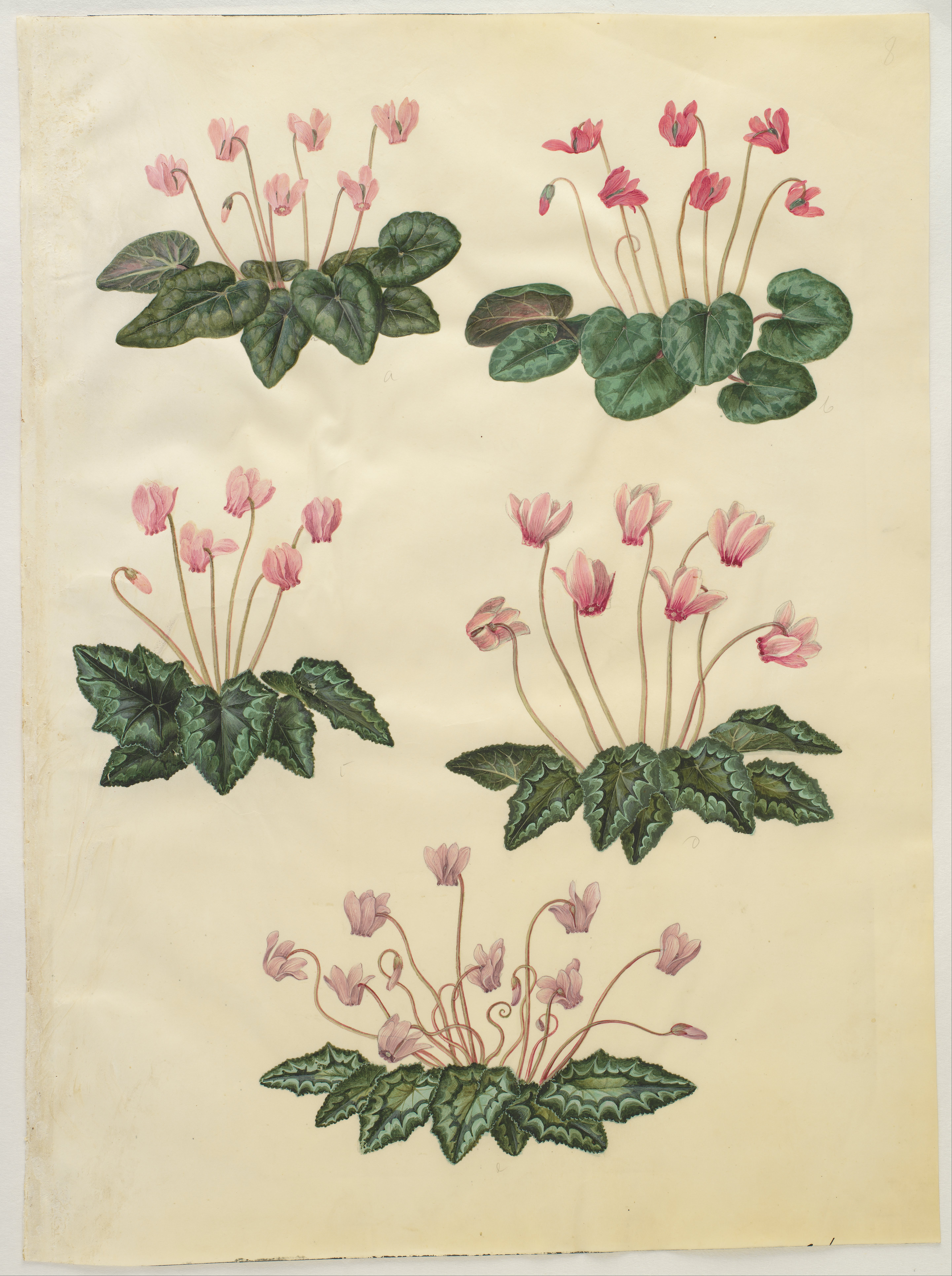
Cyclamen purpurascens; Cyclamen hederifolium, by Hans Simon Holtzbecker 1649-1659

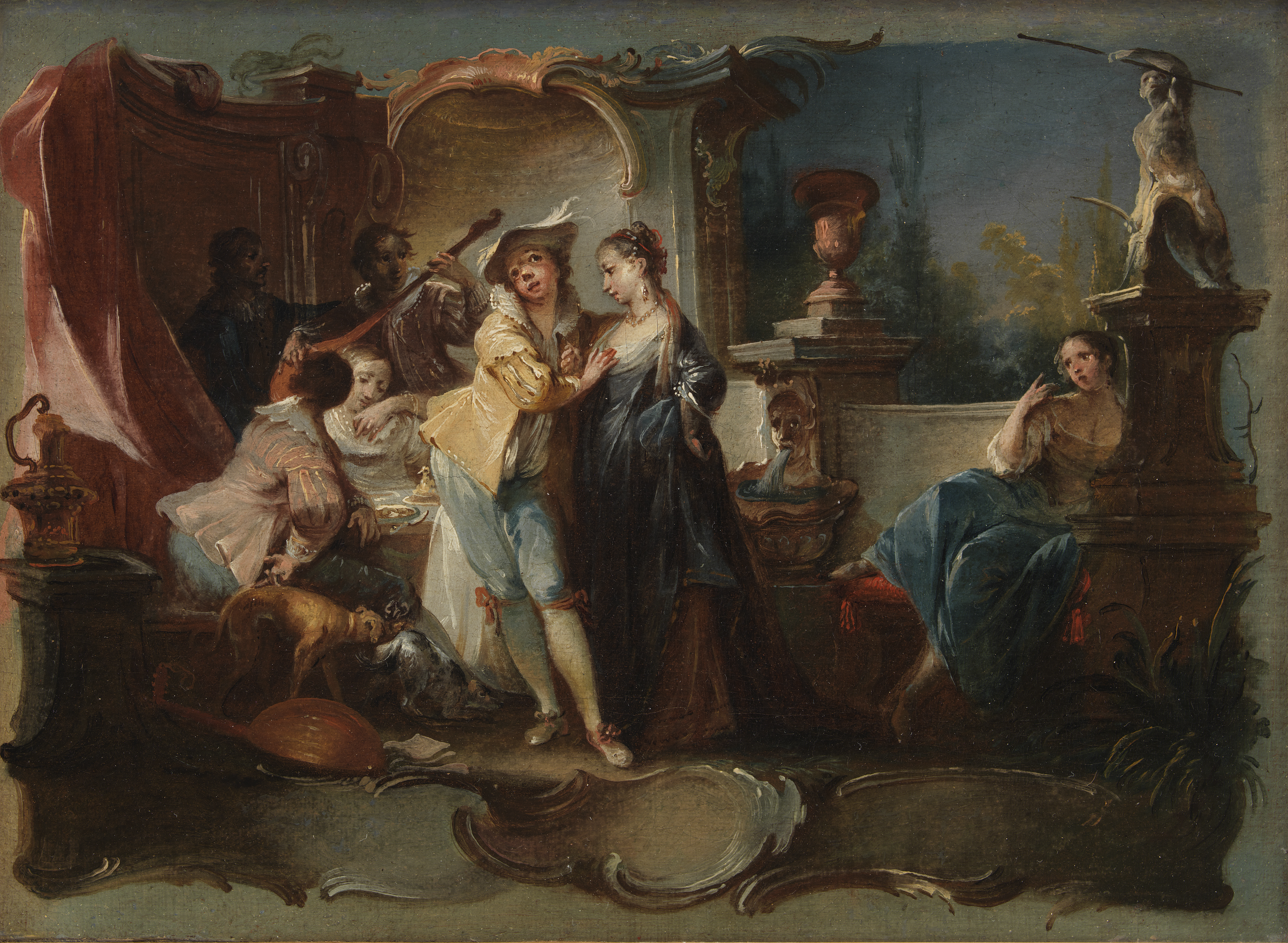
The Prodigal Son Living with Harlots, by Johann Wolfgang Baumgartner (unknown date)

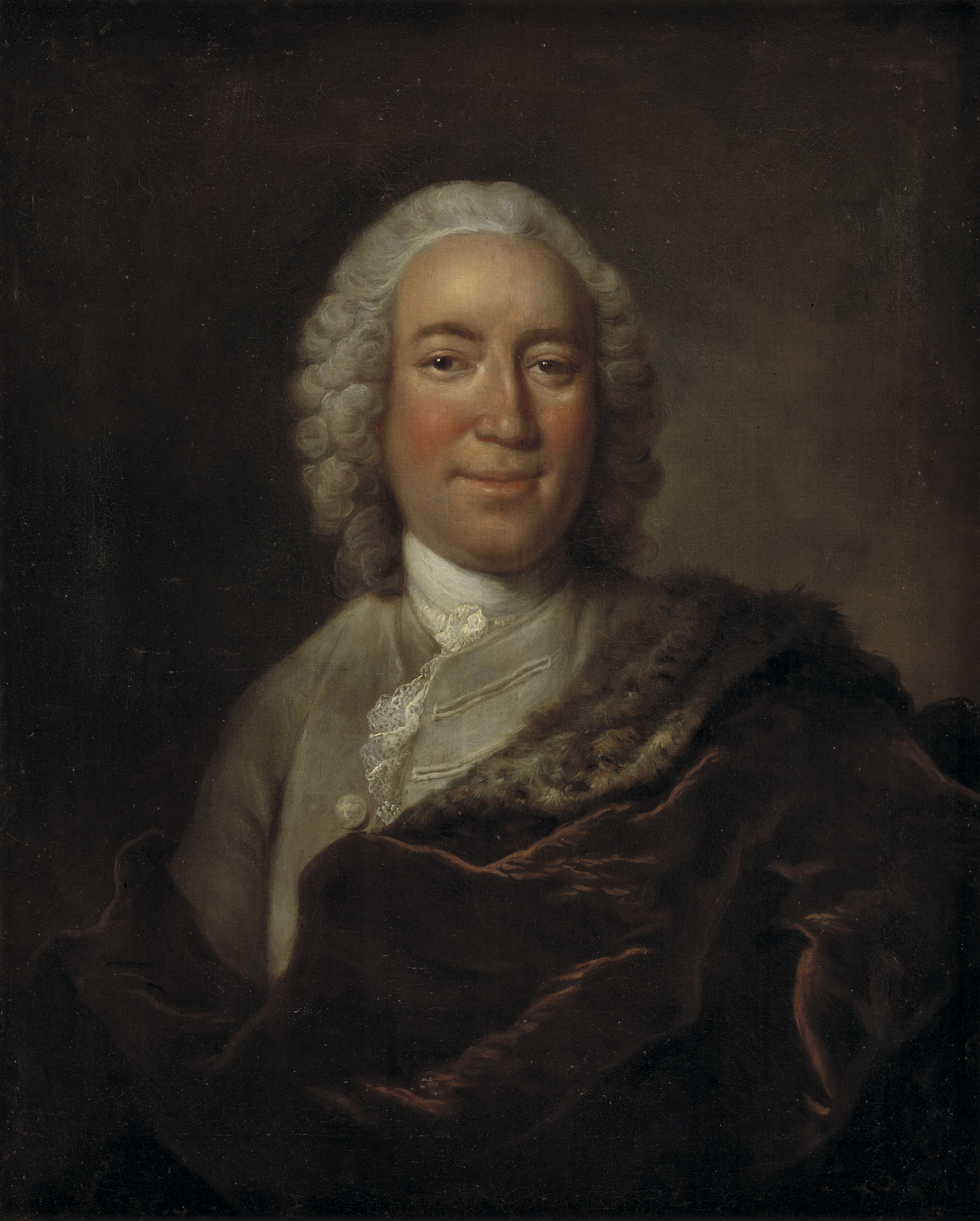
Gerhard Morell, by Johann Salomon Wahl, 1765

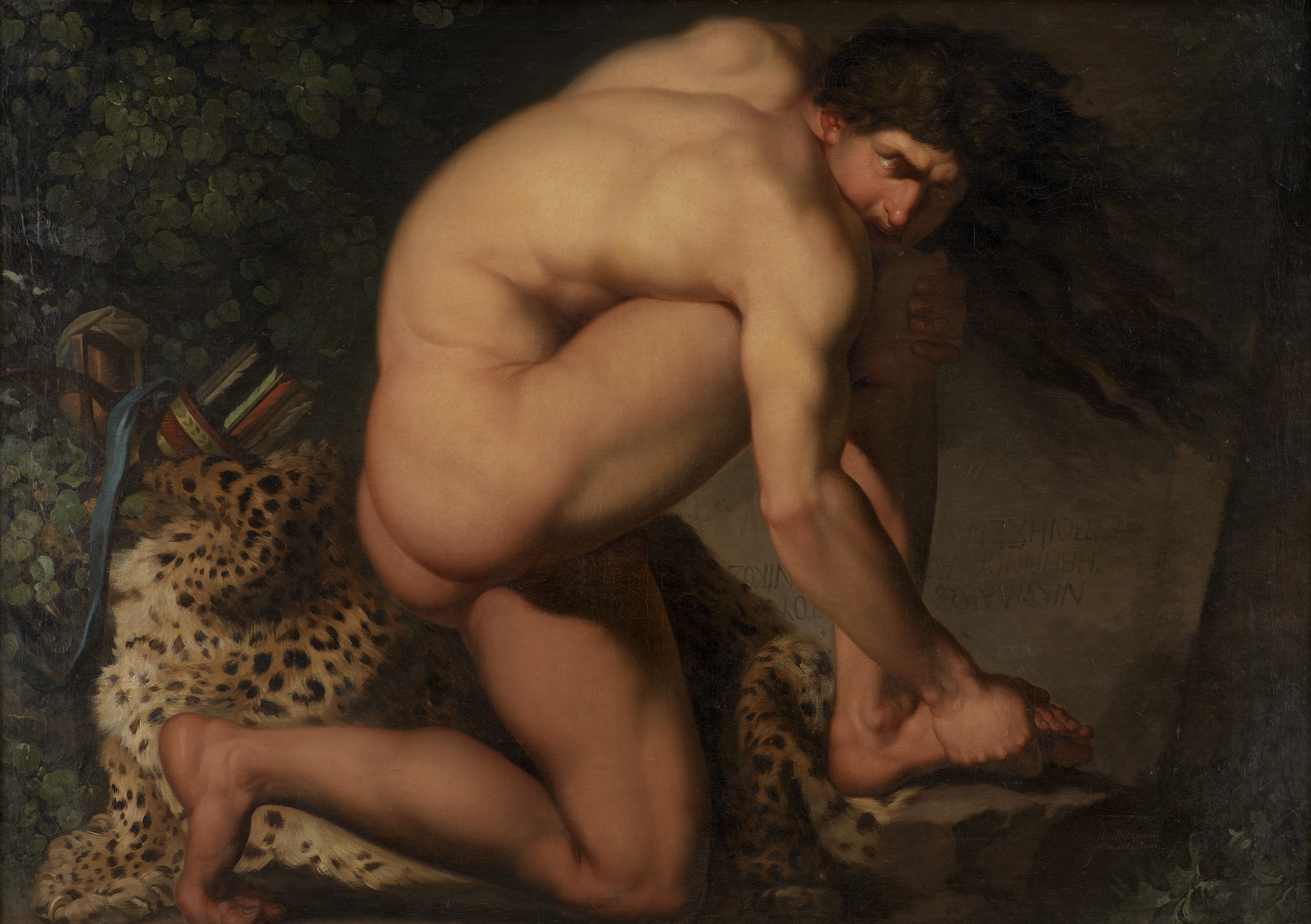
The Wounded Philoctetes, by Nicolai Abraham Abildgaard, 1775

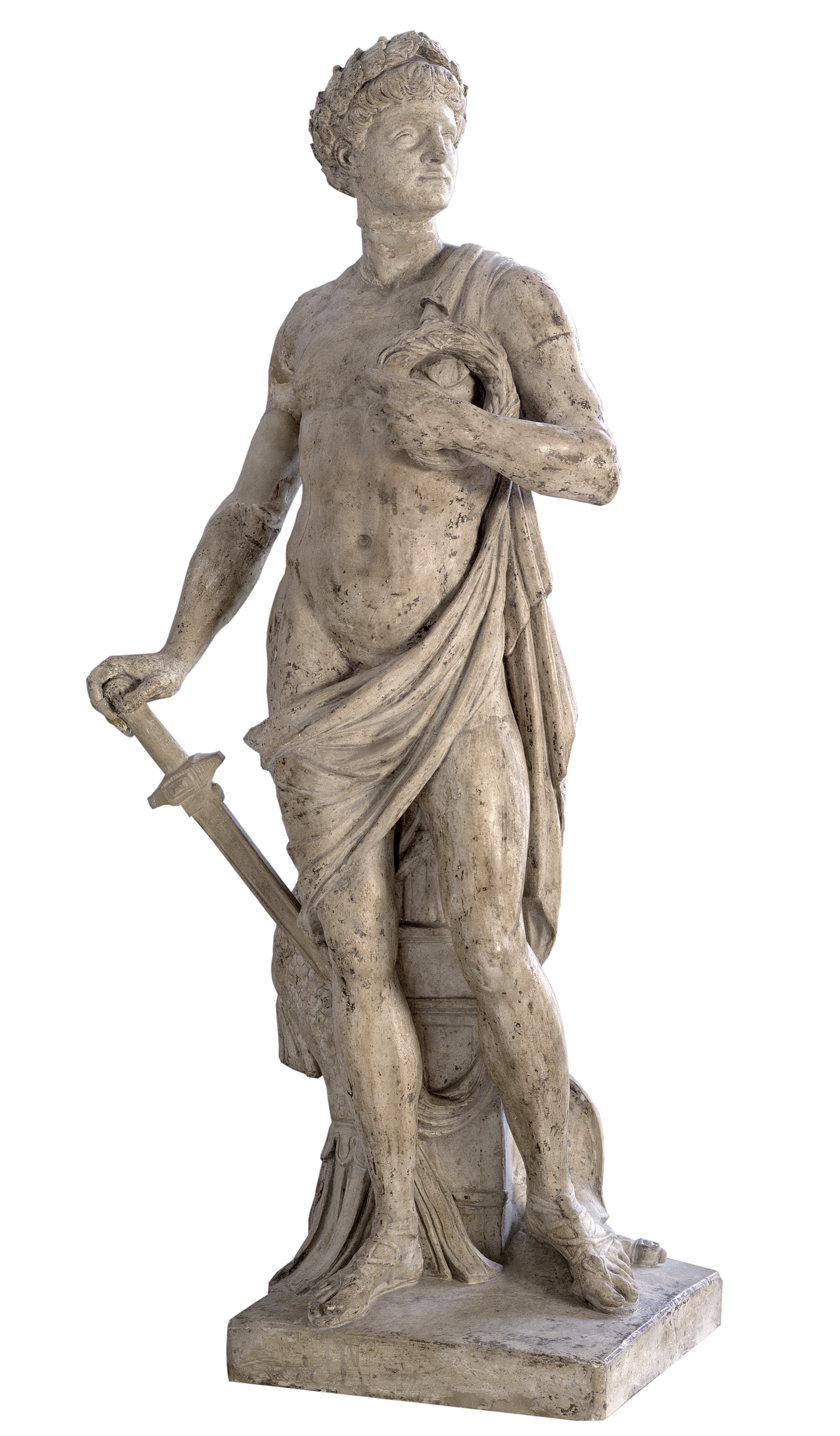
Amor patriae. Allegory symbolising patriotism, by Carl Frederik Stanley, 1777

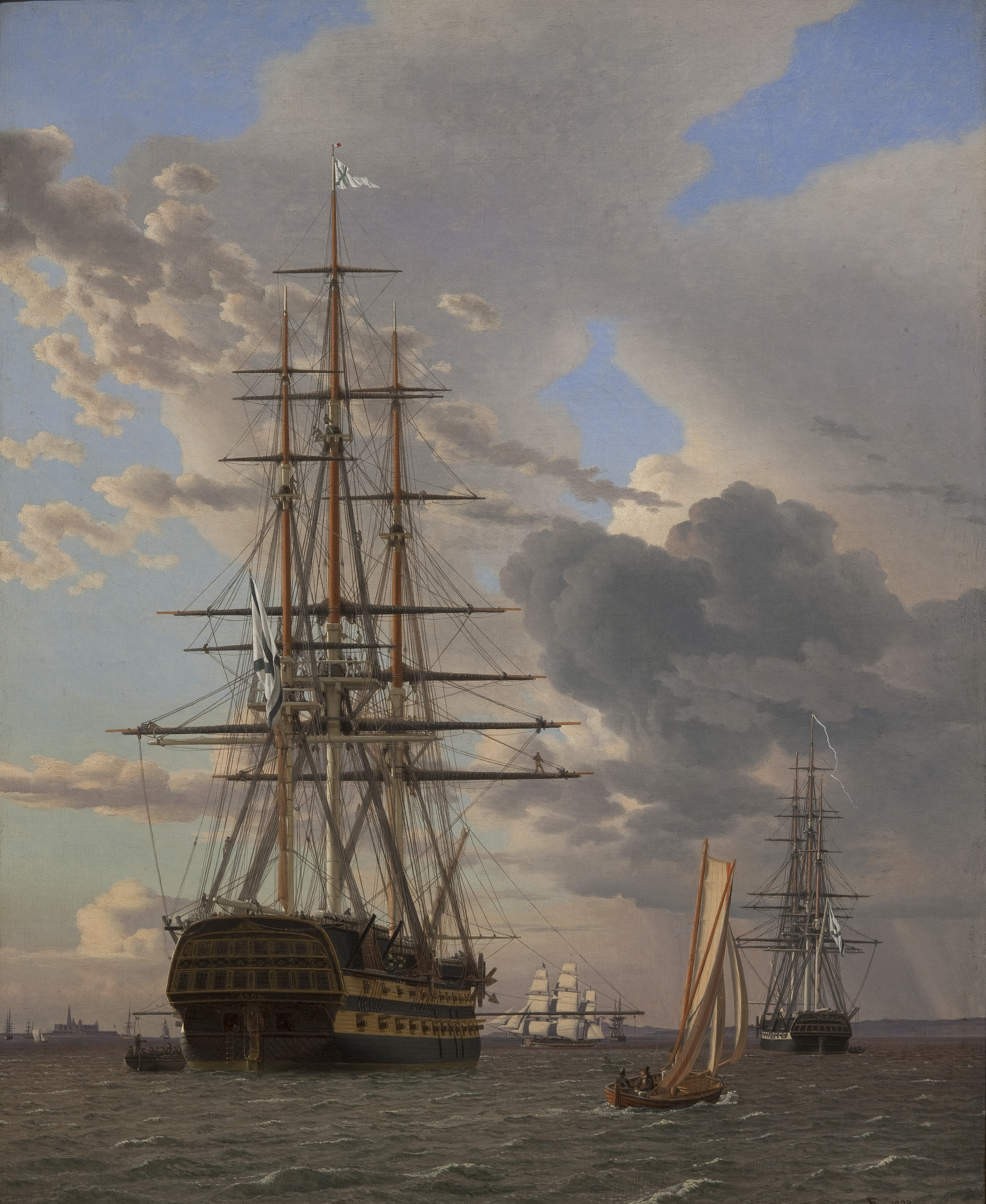
The Russian ship of the line 'Assow' and a Frigate at Anchor in the Roads of Elsinore, Christoffer Wilhelm Eckersberg, 1828

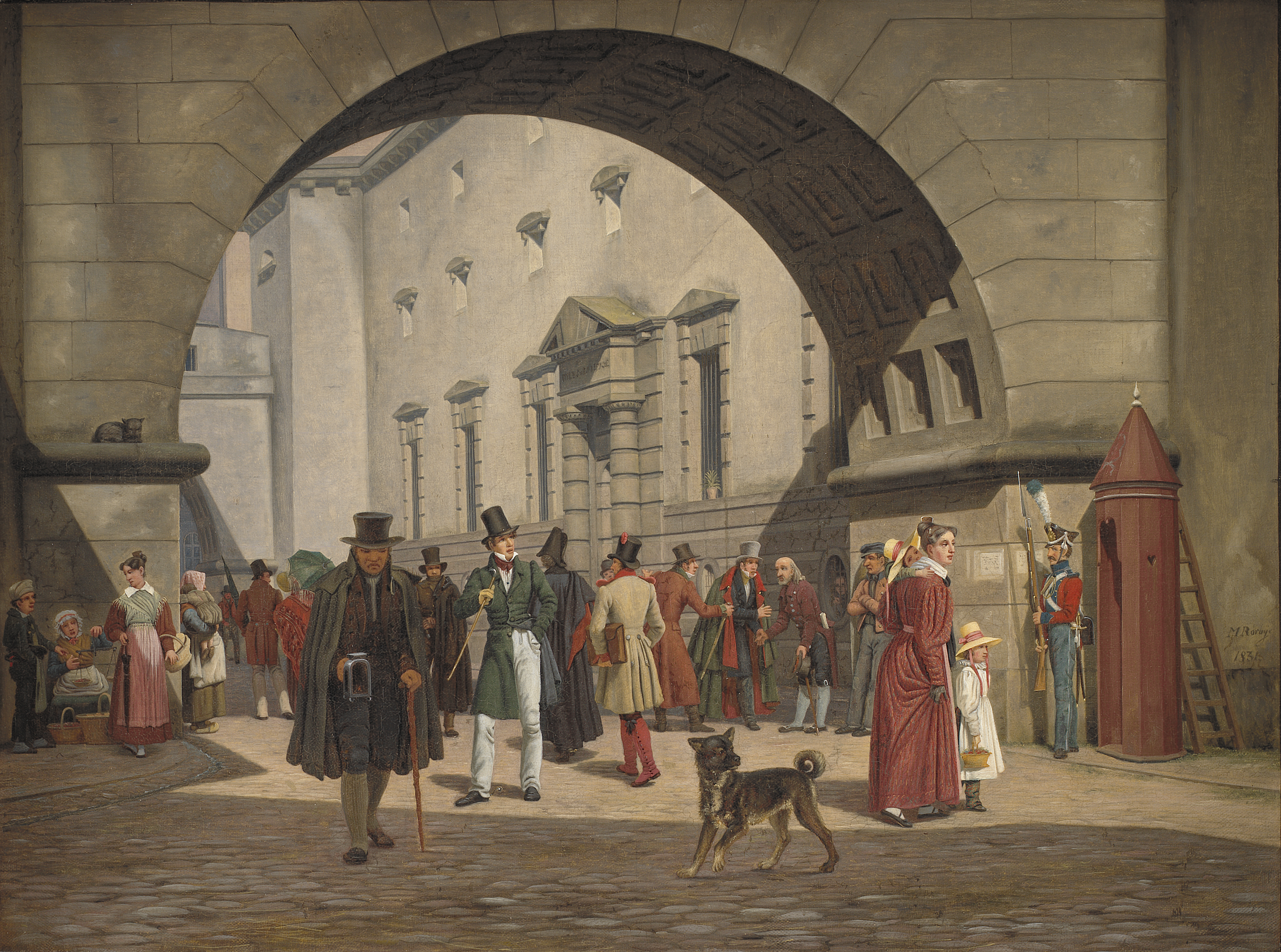
The Prison of Copenhagen, by Martinus Rørbye, 1831

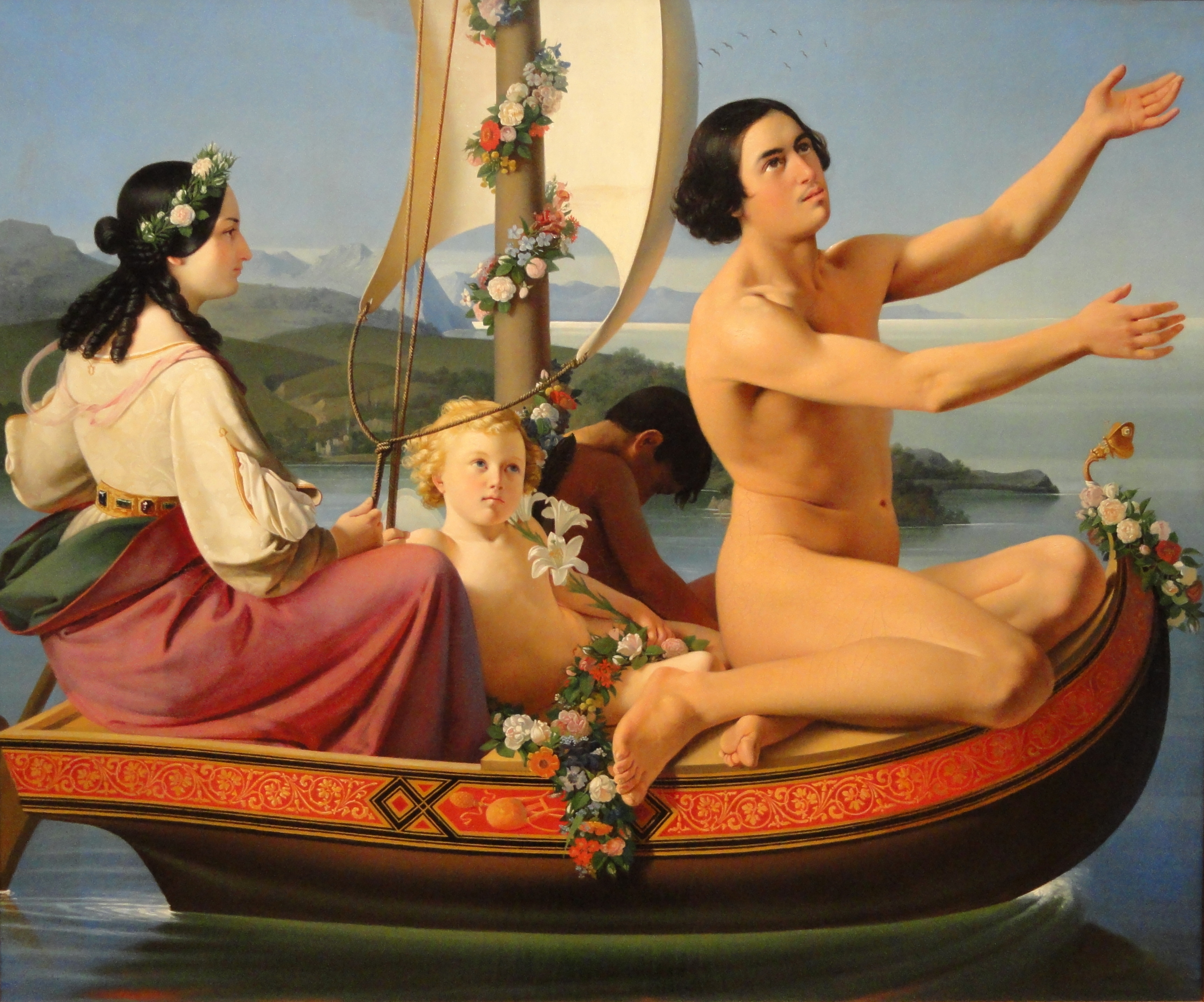
Ditlev Blunck, 1840–45, Youth, from the series The Four Ages of Man

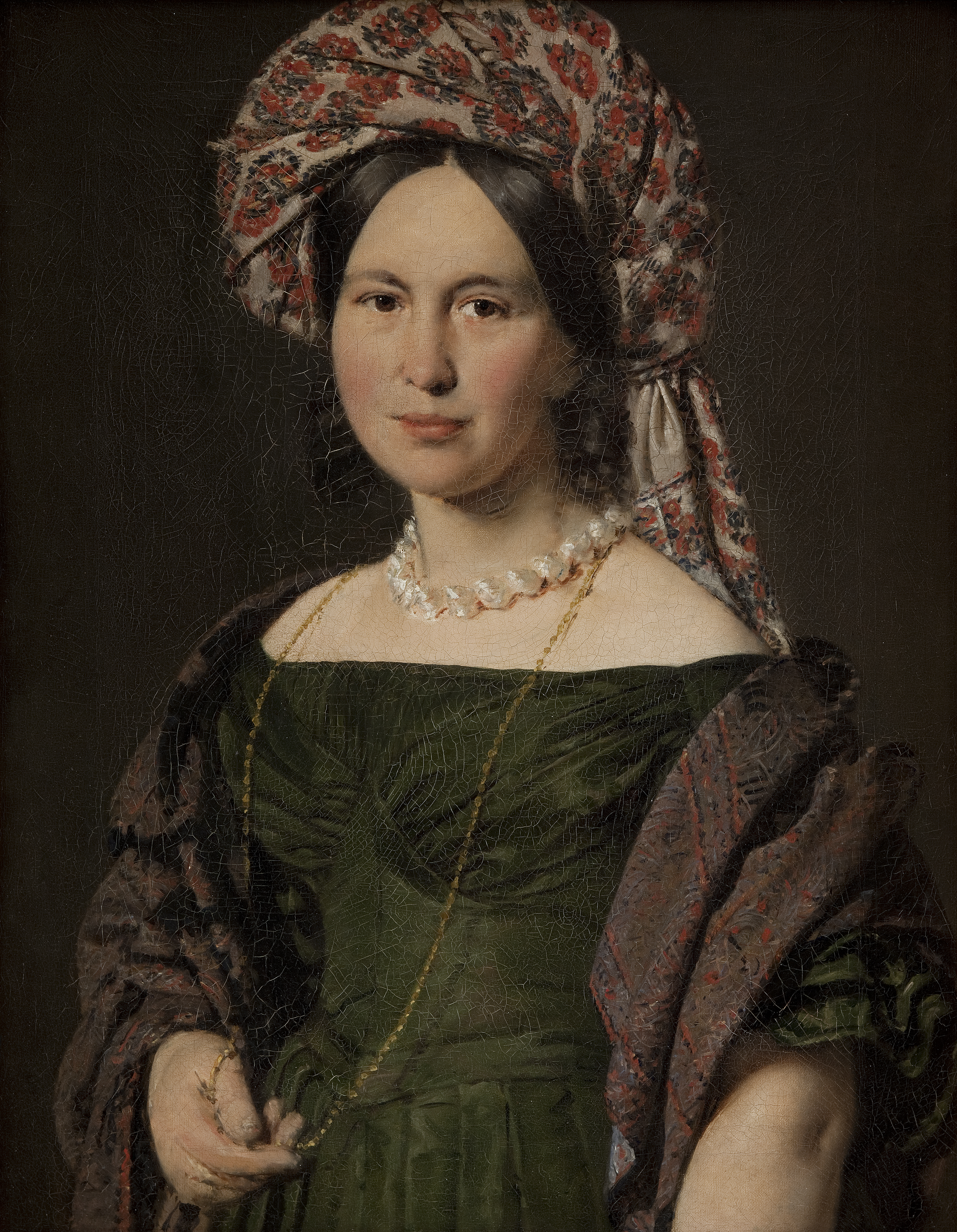
The Artist's Wife, Catherine Jensen, wearing a turban, Christian Albrecht Jensen, c. 1842–1844

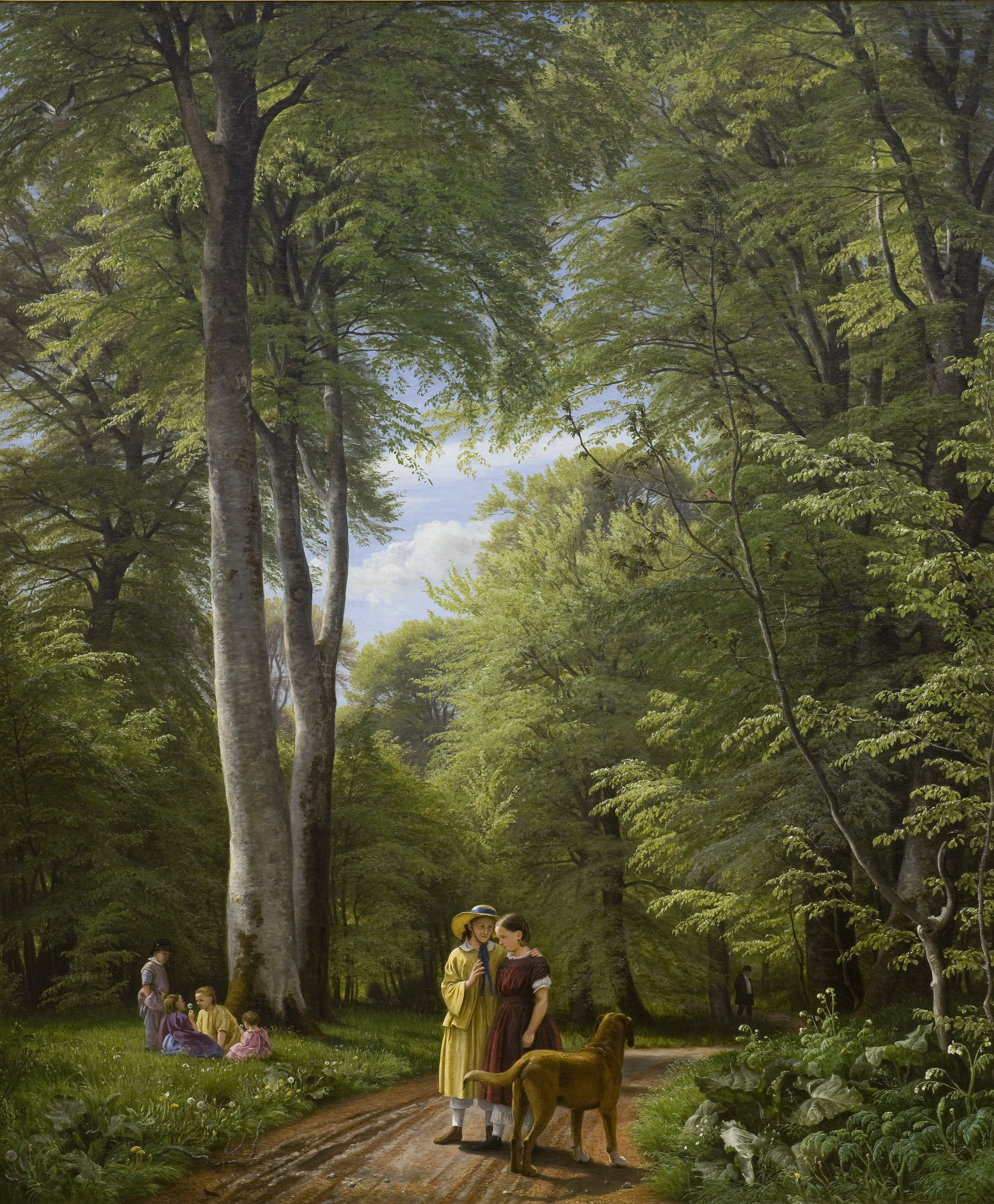
A Beech Wood in May near Iselingen Manor, Zealand, by Peter Christian Skovgaard, 1857

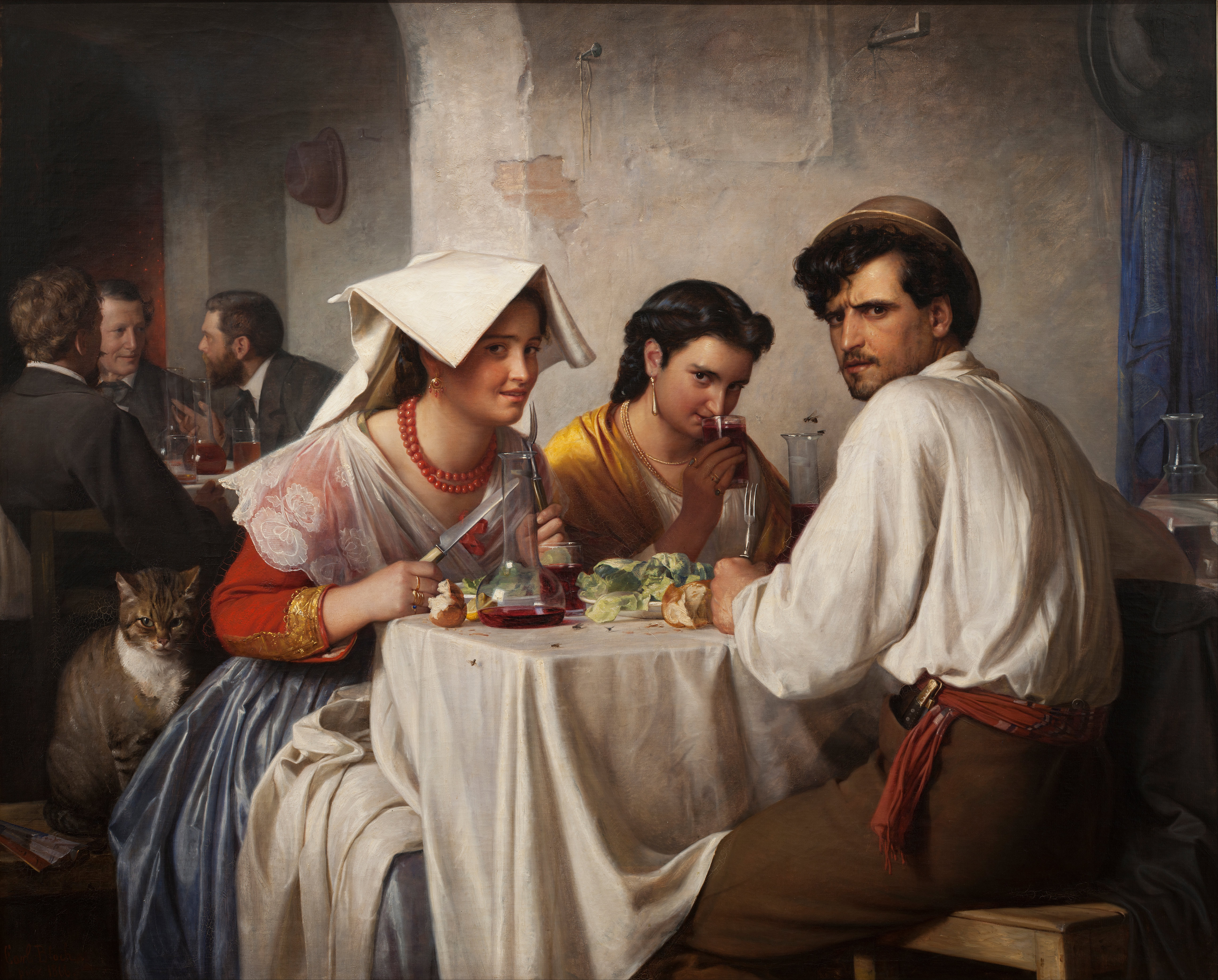
In a Roman Osteria (1866) by Carl Bloch

Bretagne-pige ordner planter i et drivhus, by Anna Petersen, 1884

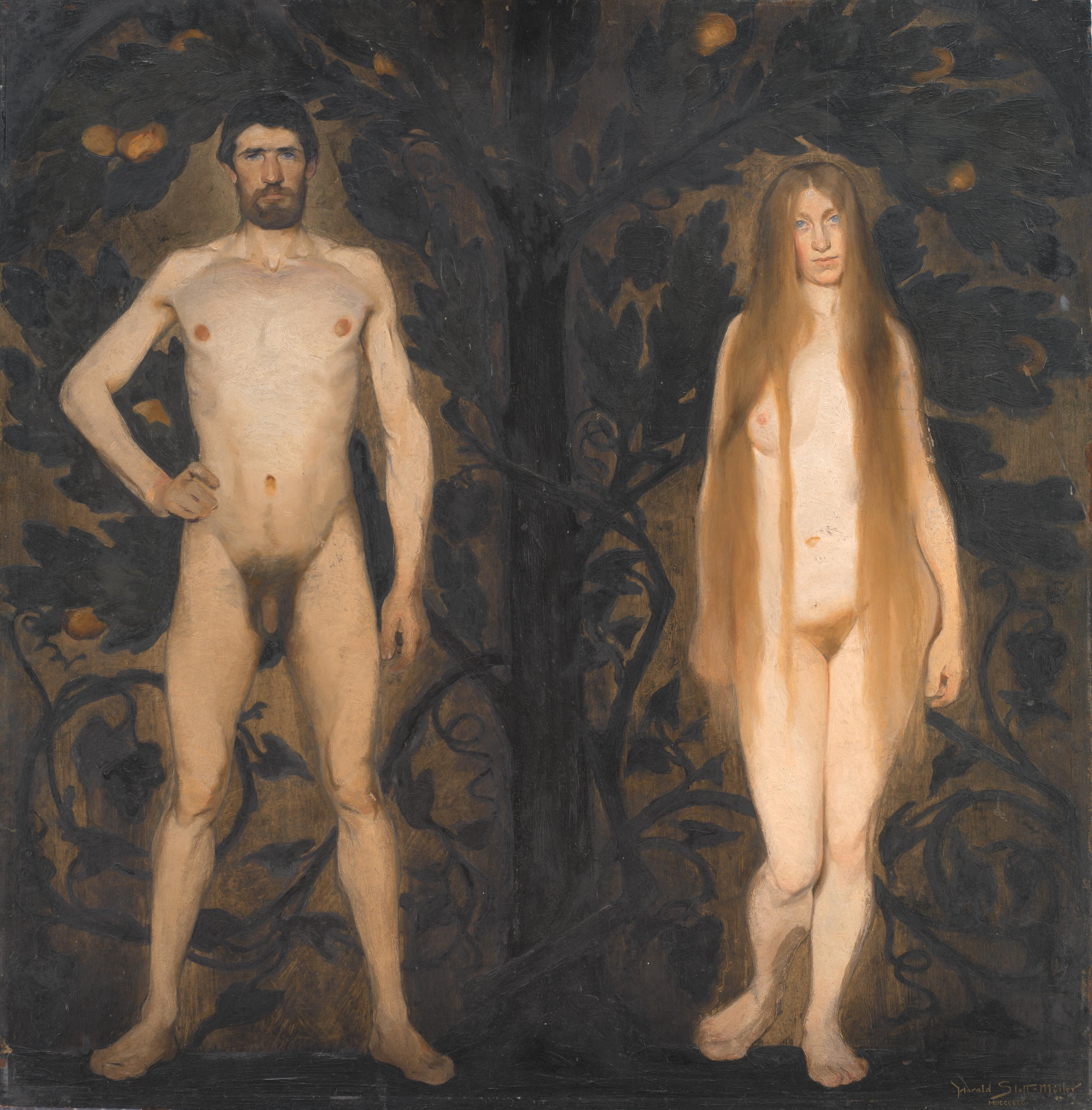
Harald Slott-Moller, 1891, Adam and Eve

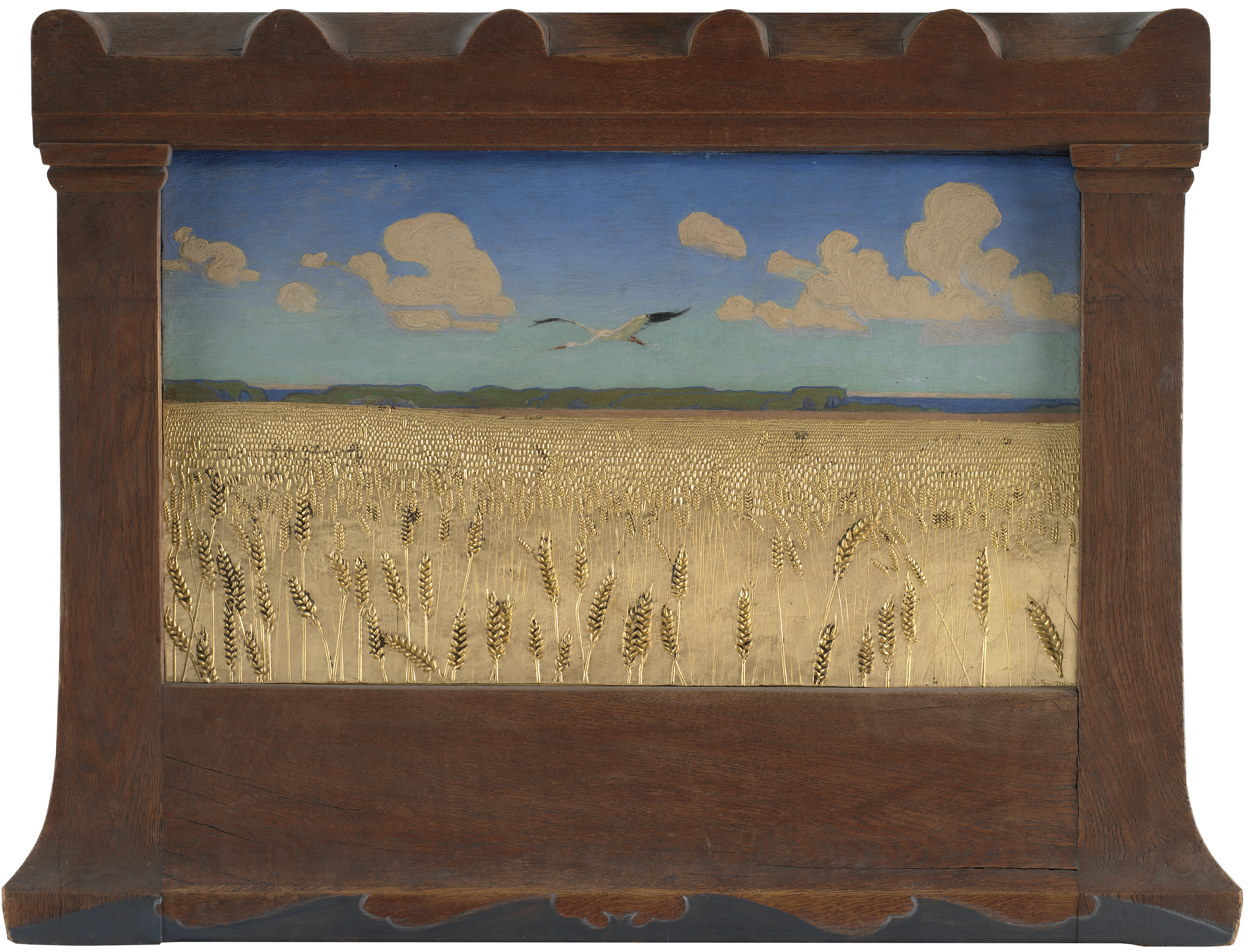
Danish Landscape, by Harald Slott-Møller, 1891

Artemis, by Vilhelm Hammershøi, 1893–1894

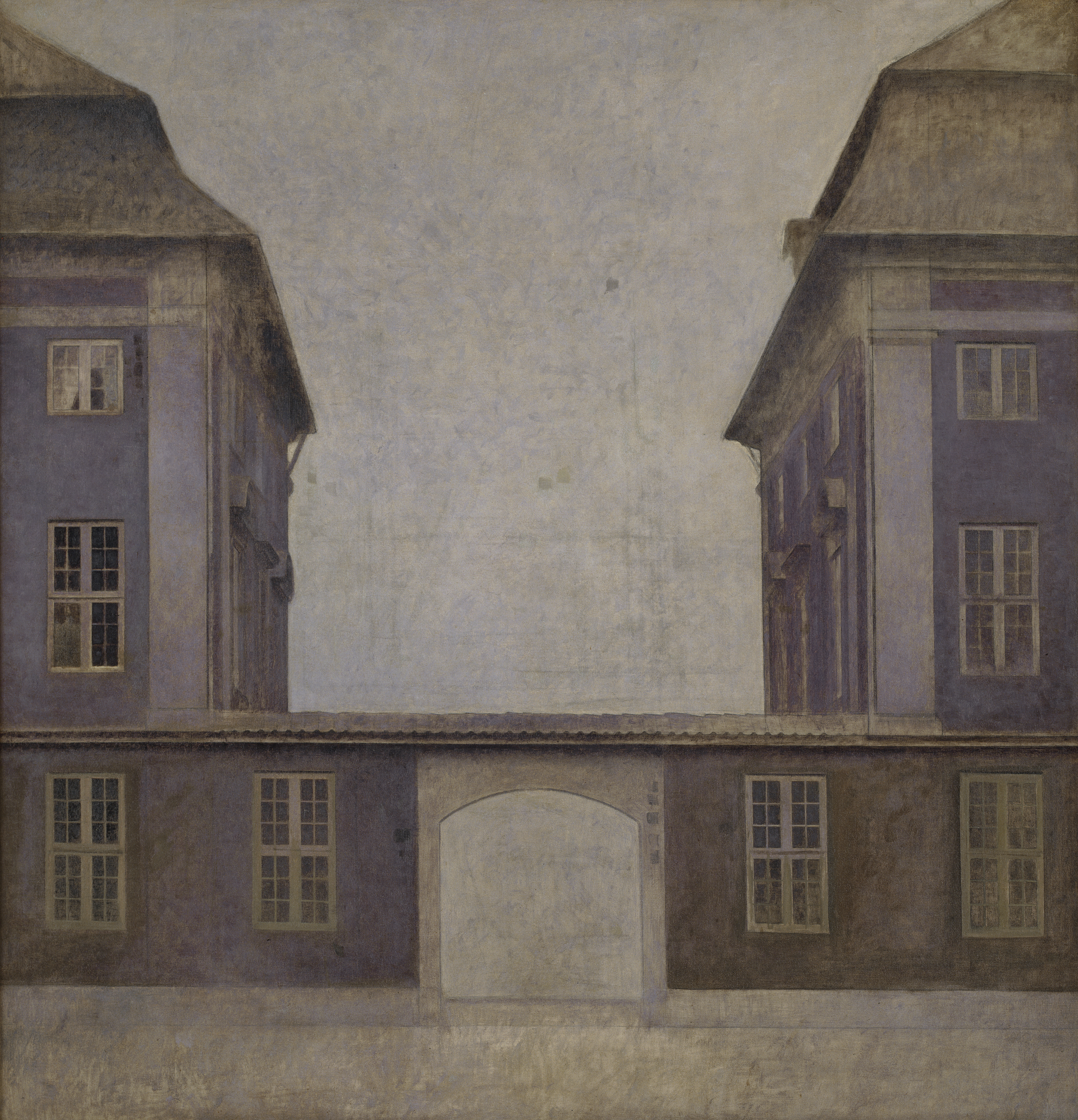
The Buildings of the Asiatic Company, seen from St. Annæ Street, by Vilhelm Hammershøi, 1902

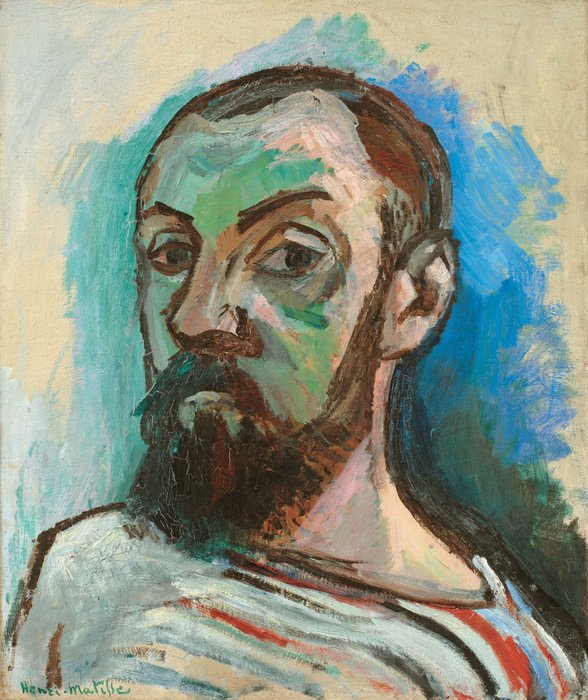
Henri Matisse, 1906, Self-Portrait in a Striped T-shirt

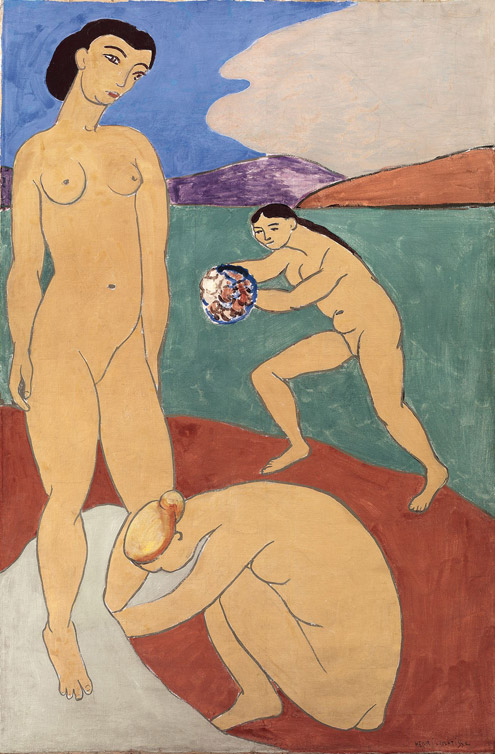
Henri Matisse, 1907–08, Le Luxe II

Jean Metzinger, 1911–1912, La Femme au Cheval (Woman with a horse)

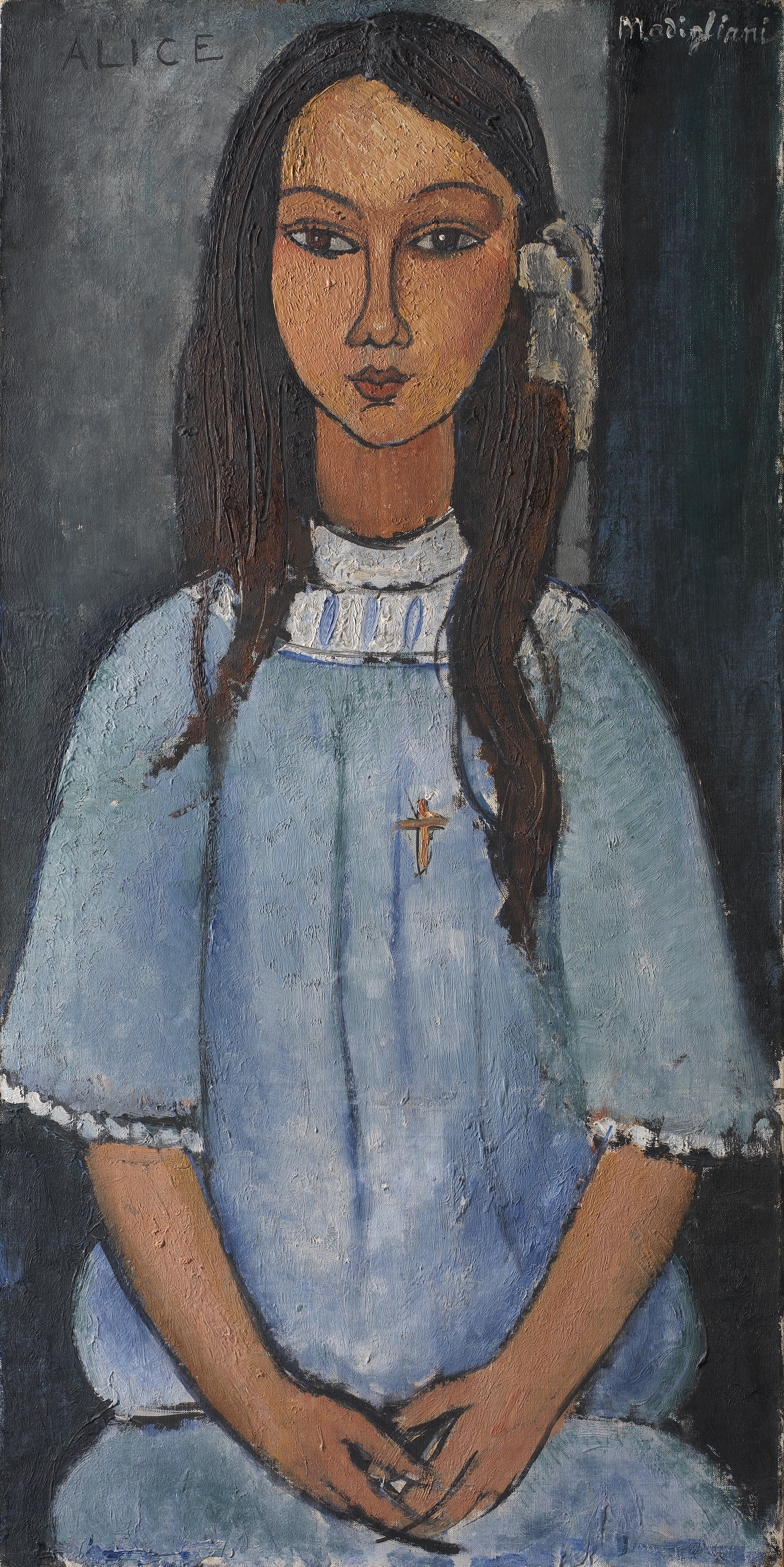
Amedeo Modigliani, c. 1918, Alice

== See also ==
- List of national galleries
