= List of Danish sculptors =

This is a list of sculptors who were born or whose creative production is associated with Denmark:

== A ==
- Gunnar Aagaard Andersen (1919–1982), concrete art movement
- Carl Aarsleff (1852–1918), statues and statuettes
- Daniel Andersen (1885–1959), also a composer
- Henrik B. Andersen (born 1958), abstract yet recognizable works, professor
- Rasmus Andersen (1861–1930), naturalistic portraits

== B ==
- Claus Berg (c. 1470 – c. 1532), Odense cathedral altarpiece
- Ejler Bille (1910–2004), small sculptures, painting
- Herman Wilhelm Bissen (1798–1868), Landsoldaten in Fredericia
- Vilhelm Bissen (1836–1913), Absalon on Højbro Plads
- Johannes Bjerg (1886–1955), El Greco inspired statues
- Thyra Boldsen (1884–1968), naturalistic sculptor, successful in California
- Carl Johan Bonnesen (1868–1933), statues and statuettes
- Peter Brandes (1944–2025), abstract art
- Ib Braase (1923–2009), left Denmark to work in France with unconventional materials
- Hans Brüggemann (c. 1480 – c. 1521), Bordesholm Altar, Schleswig Cathedral
- Anders Bundgaard (1864–1937), Gefion Fountain, Copenhagen

== C ==
- Anne Marie Carl-Nielsen (1863–1945), naturalistic figures of animals and people
- Caius Gabriel Cibber (1630–1700), statues in London
- Louis August le Clerc (1688–1771), Rococo decoration, Christiansborg
- Ingvar Cronhammar (1947–2021), monumental public art

== D ==
- Jens Peter Dahl-Jensen (1874–1960), animal figurines
- Adam van Düren (c. 1487 – c. 1532), Linköping Cathedral

== E ==
- Torben Ebbesen (born 1945), installations with contrasting materials
- Friederich Ehbisch (1672–1748), stucco in Rosenborg and Fredensborg Castles
- Gottfred Eickhoff (1902–1982), French-inspired bronze female figures
- Olafur Eliasson (born 1967), large-scale installations
- Edvard Eriksen (1876–1959), Little Mermaid, Copenhagen

== F ==
- Sonja Ferlov Mancoba (1911–1984), avant-garde sculptor
- Adam Fischer (1888–1968), Cubist figures
- Jacob Fortling (1711–1761), staircases in various palaces
- Wilhelm Freddie (1909–1995), realism, abstract art
- Hermann Ernst Freund (1786–1840), Nordic mythology

== G ==
- Paul Gadegaard (1920–1992), designed factory furnishings to complement his artwork
- Jens Galschiøt (born 1954), main bronze public sculptures
- Jean René Gauguin (1881–1961), bronze castings of athletes and dancers
- Ib Geertsen (1919–2009), mobiles and hanging art
- Johannes Gelert (1852–1923), public art in the United States
- Jørgen Gudmundsen-Holmgreen (1985–1966), busts inspired by classical Greek sculpture

== H ==
- Aksel Hansen (1853–1933), Echo, Rosenborg Castle Gardens
- Karl Hansen Reistrup (1863–1929), ceramics from Kähler's workshop in Næstved
- Rasmus Harboe (1868–1952), Hercules Fountain, Vesterbros Torv
- Carl Hartmann (1837–1901), worked with antique motifs in the Thorvaldsen tradition
- Louis Hasselriis (1844–1912), public statues of national heroes
- Arne Haugen Sørensen (born 1932), church decoration in a variety of art forms
- Jørgen Haugen Sørensen (1934–2021), figurative bronzes, large angular works
- Hein Heinsen (born 1935), minimalism
- Gerhard Henning (1880–1967), statues of the female form
- Louise Hindsgavl (born 1973), sculptor
- Hans Holst (1619, died after 1640), woodcarver
- Horder (12th century), baptismal fonts
- Knud Hvidberg (1927–1986), Constructivist works inspired by Linien II

== J ==
- Niels Hansen Jacobsen (1861–1941), Troll that smells Christian blood
- Robert Jacobsen (1912–1993), sculpture part at Tørskind Gravel Pit
- Georg Jensen (1866–1935), Art Nouveau silversmith
- Søren Georg Jensen (1917–1982), silversmith and sculptor
- Steen Krarup Jensen (born 1950), experimental work, mobiles and assemblages
- Jens Adolf Jerichau (1816–1883), dynamic naturalistic figures including Penelope
- Asger Jorn (1914–1973), versatile artist, founded avant-garde COBRA, over 2,500 works
- Lorentz Jørgensen (1644, died after 1681), woodcarver

== K ==
- Per Kirkeby (1938–2018), experimental eks-skolen works, widely exhibited
- Elle Klarskov Jørgensen (born 1958), installations
- Eigil Knuth (1903–1996), Inuit busts
- Dorthe Kristoffersen (1906–1976), Greenlandic sculptor of small mythological figures
- K'itura Kristoffersen (born 1939), Greenlandic sculptor
- Sara Kristoffersen (1937–2008), Greenlandic sculptor

== L ==
- Jørn Larsen (1926–2004), member of Grønningen, sculptures in marble, granite, steel
- Christian Lemmerz (born 1959), German-born sculptor, illustrator and performance artist
- Jan Leth (1932–2010), abstract monumental works
- Kirsten Lockenwitz (born 1932), abstract works often in unconventional materials including neon tubes
- Agnes Lunn (1850–1941), animals including horses and cows
- Sigrid Lütken (1915–2008), sculptor focusing on abstract works depicting plants, animals and people

== M ==
- Julie Marstrand (1882–1943), sculptor, textile artist and writer
- Harvey Martin (1942–2014), smith and sculptor, public works in iron and steel
- Egon Møller-Nielsen (1915–1959), abstract surrealistic works
- Brix Michgell (early 17th century), sculptor, woodworker
- Mogens Møller (1934–2021), Minimalist sculptor, large public works

== N ==
- Knud Nellemose (1908–1997), sportsmen, famous Danes
- Kai Nielsen (1882–1924), rounded female forms, works on Blågårds Plads
- Astrid Noack (1888–1954), specialized in the human figure
- Bjørn Nørgaard (born 1947), critical works, various materials, monumental public sculptures

== O ==
- Tove Ólafsson (1909–1992), sculptor
- Henrik Olrik (1830–1890), designs for tableware
- Hans Pauli Olsen (born 1957), public works in Tórshavn
- John Olsen (1938–2019), works based on birds and animals in natural materials
- Willy Ørskov (1920–1990), plastics and inflatable materials
- Kirsten Ortwed (born 1948), striking sculptures in public places

== P ==
- Carl-Henning Pedersen (1913–2007), monumental art
- Hans Peder Pedersen-Dan (1859–1939), granite elephants, Carlsberg Brewery
- Johanne Pedersen-Dan (1860–1934), sculptor
- Nielsine Petersen (1851–1916), sculptor, bronze statues
- Johann Christoph Petzold (1708–1762), Neptune and Mercury at Børsen
- Axel Poulsen (1887–1972), large public memorials

== Q ==
- Thomas Quellinus (1661–1709), baroque works in churches and memorial chapels

== R ==
- Arne Ranslet (1931–2018), grotesque animal sculptures and monumental bronze works
- Svend Rathsack (1885–1941), Maritime Monument on Copenhagen's waterfront, Lumbye monument in Tivoli
- Lise Ring (born 1936), sculptures of women, children and animals

== S ==
- August Saabye (1823–1916), small elaborate bronzes, Hans Christian Andersen statue in Rosenborg Castle Gardens
- Jacques Saly (1717–1776), equestrian statue of Frederik V at Amalienborg (1846–1922)
- Stephan Sinding (1846–1922), symbolic works including Valkyrien
- Niels Skovgaard (1858–1938), statue of N.F.S. Grundtvig
- Povl Søndergaard (1905–1986), simply crafted bronze or granite works
- Carl Frederik Stanley (c. 1738–1813), Neo-classical monuments and decorative work
- Simon Carl Stanley (1703–1761), numerous marble statues including Venus, Adonis and Cupid in Fredensborg
- Henrik Starcke (1899–1973), fanciful creatures
- Hans van Steenwinckel the Younger (1587–1639), sculptural works for Kronborg and Frederiksborg
- Hans van Steenwinckel the Youngest (1639–1700), sepulchral chapel in St Peter's, Copenhagen
- Theobald Stein (1829–1901), Ludvig Holberg statue outside the Royal Danish Theatre
- Morten Stræde (born 1956), organic and geometric works
- Leif Sylvester Petersen (born 1940), art in public spaces

== T ==
- Rudolph Tegner (1873–1950), Symbolism, controversial monument to Niels Finsen
- Erik Thommesen (1916–2008), Expressionist representations of the human figure in hardwood inspired by African sculpture
- Christian Thomsen (1860–1921), influential role in producing porcelain figures
- Bertel Thorvaldsen (c. 1770–1844), Neo-classical statues crafted mainly in Italy, Christ in Vor Frue Kirke
- Elisabeth Toubro (born 1956), renewal of Danish sculpture with emphasis on Greenland
- Kurt Trampedach (1943–2013), mainly a painter

== U ==
- Einar Utzon-Frank (1888–1955), many classical works for public monuments in the Thorvaldsen style

== V ==
- Hanne Varming (1939–2022), sculptor and medallist

== W ==
- Olga Wagner (1873–1963), stone and bronze statues, porcelain figures
- Gunnar Westman (1915–1985), stylized figures, often of children
- Johannes Wiedewelt (1731–1802), Neo-classical works for the Danish court including memorial monument of Christian VI
- Svend Wiig Hansen (1922–1997), Mennesket ved havet near Esbjerg
- Jens Ferdinand Willumsen (1863–1958), versatile artists also practicing sculpture

== See also ==
- List of Danish painters
