= Christoffersen =

Christoffersen (Danish: [kʰʁiˈstʌfɐsn̩], Urban East Norwegian: [krɪˈstɔ̀fːəʂɳ̍]) is a Danish-Norwegian patronymic surname, literally meaning son of Christoffer, the North Germanic form of the Greek given name Χριστόφορος, Christóphοros. There are two less common spelling variants Kristoffersen and Christophersen; they have identical pronunciation. In Denmark, the three spelling variants are the 53rd, 83rd, and 205th (respectively) most popular surnames. In Norway, Kristoffersen is the commoner form, but Christoffersen is also found. Occurrence of the surname outside Denmark, Norway and Schleswig-Holstein is due to migration. Immigrants to English-speaking countries sometimes changed the spelling to Christofferson, Kristofferson, or Christopherson.

== People ==
- Asmund Kristoffersen (born 1944), Norwegian politician
- Birte Christoffersen (1924–2026), Danish-Swedish diver
- Chris Christoffersen (born 1979), former Danish basketball player
- Christin Kristoffersen (born 1973), Norwegian politician
- D. Todd Christofferson (born 1945), American religious leader
- David Christopherson (born 1954), Canadian politician
- Debra Christofferson (born 1963), American actress
- Dorthe Kristoffersen (1906–1976), Greenlandic sculptor
- Ellen Christoffersen (born 1972), Greenlandic politician
- Eric Christoffersen of Denmark (c. 1307 – early 1332), Danish junior king
- Frank Christopherson Jr. (1927–2020), American politician
- Frode Kristoffersen (1931–2016), Danish journalist and politician
- Hans Christian Christoffersen (1882–1966), Norwegian chess player
- Henning Christophersen (1939–2016), Danish politician, vice-president of the European Commission 1985–1995
- Henrik Kristoffersen (born 1994), Norwegian alpine skier
- Hjalmar Christoffersen (1889–1966), Danish amateur footballer
- John Christopherson (died 1558) was Chaplain and confessor
- John Christophersen (c.1951–2021), Aboriginal Australian activist, father of Nova Peris and council member of the Northern Land Council
- John Christopherson (cricketer) (1909–1999), English cricketer
- John Brian Christopherson (1868–1955), British physician
- Julian Kristoffersen (born 1997), Norwegian footballer
- K'itura Kristoffersen (born 1939), Greenlandic sculptor
- Kris Kristofferson (1936–2024), U.S. country music songwriter, singer and actor
- Lone Kristoffersen (born 1961), Danish female curler
- Morten Christoffersen (born 1968), Danish windsurfer
- Percy Christopherson (1866–1921), English cricketer
- Peter Christopherson (1955–2010), British musician
- Quinn Christopherson, American singer-songwriter
- Sara Kristoffersen (1937–2008), Greenlandic sculptor
- Scott Christopherson (born 1989), American basketball player
- Stanley Christopherson (1861–1949), English cricketer
- Thies Christophersen (1918–1997), German Holocaust denier

== Places ==
- Christoffersen Heights, Ellsworth Land, Antarctica
- Christoffersen Island, South Orkney Islands, Antarctica

== See also ==
- Christopherson Yap (born 1981), Filipino politician
- Kristofferson (disambiguation)
