= A Mother (sculpture) =

1908 Sculpture by Hans Peder Pedersen-Dan

- En moder (Danish)
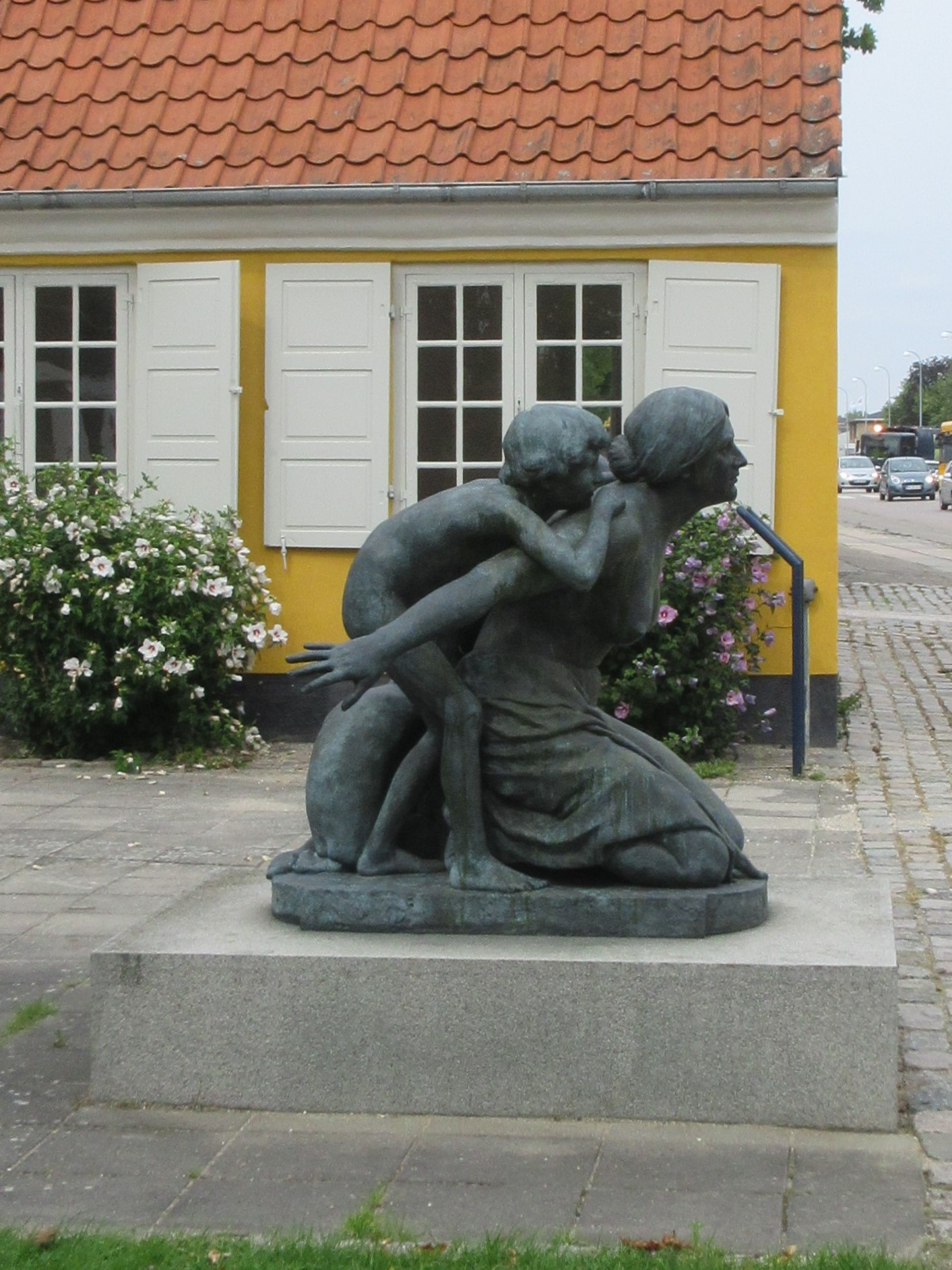
- Artist: Hans Peder Pedersen-Dan
- Year: 1908
- Type: bronze
- Location: Hvidovre, Copenhagen, Denmark; 55.656567°N 12.472989°E

A Mother (Danish: En moder) is a sculpture created by Danish sculptor Hans Peder Pedersen-Dan in 1908. A bronze cast of the sculpture was installed outside Hvidovre Rytterskole on Hvidovrevej in Hvidovre in 2005. Pedersen-Dan and his wife Johanne Pedersen-Dan lived and worked in the building for more than 20 years. They are buried at the adjacent Hvidovre Cemetery.

== Description ==
The sculpture depicts a kneeling woman with naked torso and three small children. The woman leans forward and her arms are pushed backwards to shield the children that clings to her back.

== History ==
Hans Pedersen-Dan and Johanne Pedersen-Dan married in 1892. The couple had no children but adopted a girl, Rigmor. Dan-Pedersen created A Mother in 1908. The sculpture was directly inspired by Rigmor's biological mother, who is portrayed with her three remaining children. The Pedersen-Dan Family took over Hvidovre Rytterskole in 1912. They lived in the building until 1936.
