= Stanley House, Copenhagen =

Building in Copenhagen, Denmark

Coordinates: 55°40′14″N 12°35′17″E

Stanley House
- Stanleys Gård
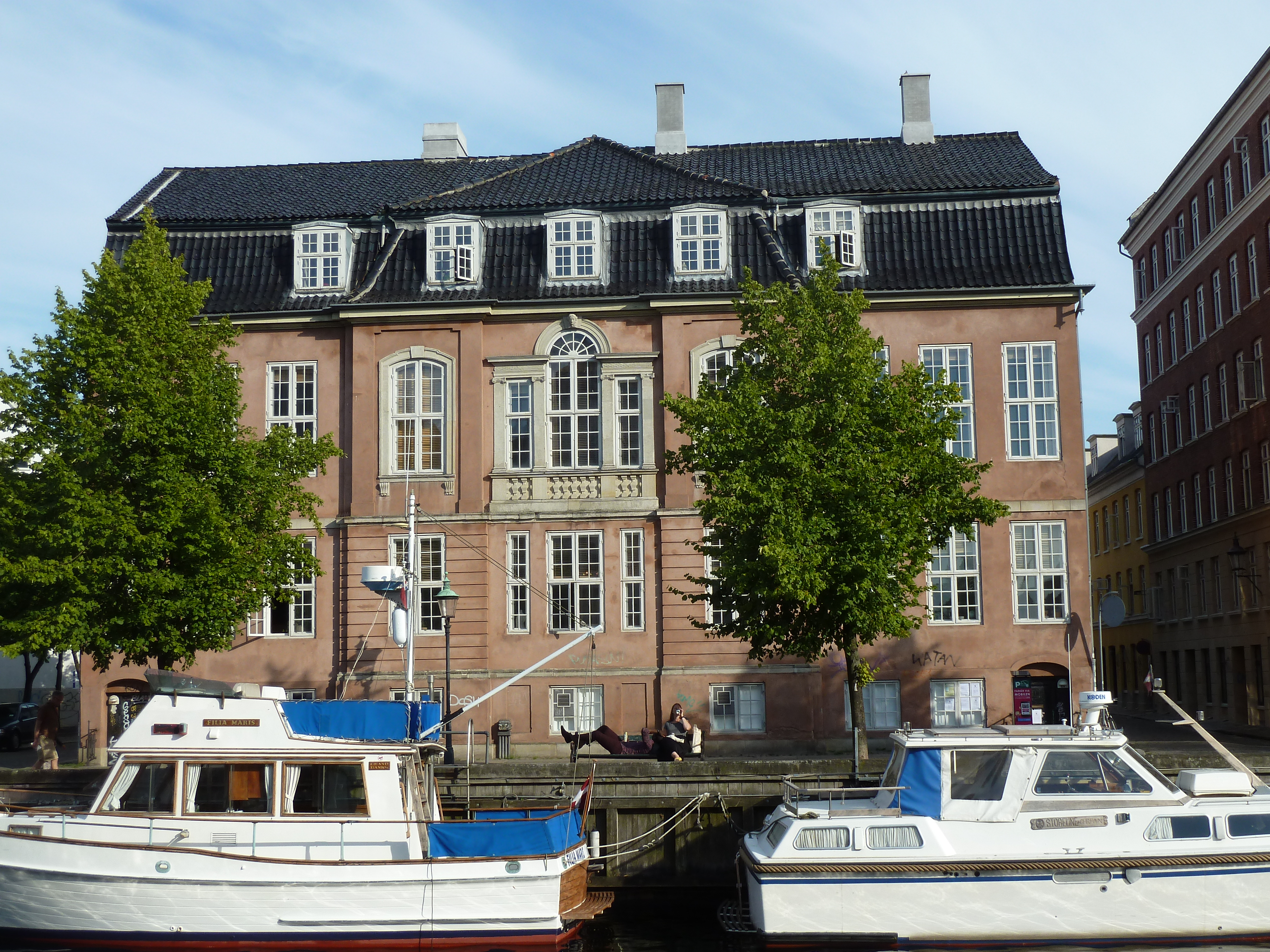
- The building seen from across the canal
- Interactive map of the Stanley House area

General information
- Architectural style: Rococo
- Location: Copenhagen, Denmark, Denmark
- Completed: 1756
- Client: Simon Carl Stanley
- Owner: Amagerbro Provsti

Stanley House (Danish: Stanleys Gård) is a Rococo mansion overlooking Christianshavn Canal in the Christianshavn neighbourhood of Copenhagen, Denmark. The house takes its name after its founder, Simon Carl Stanley, and was possibly built to his own design.

== History ==
=== Stanley family ===
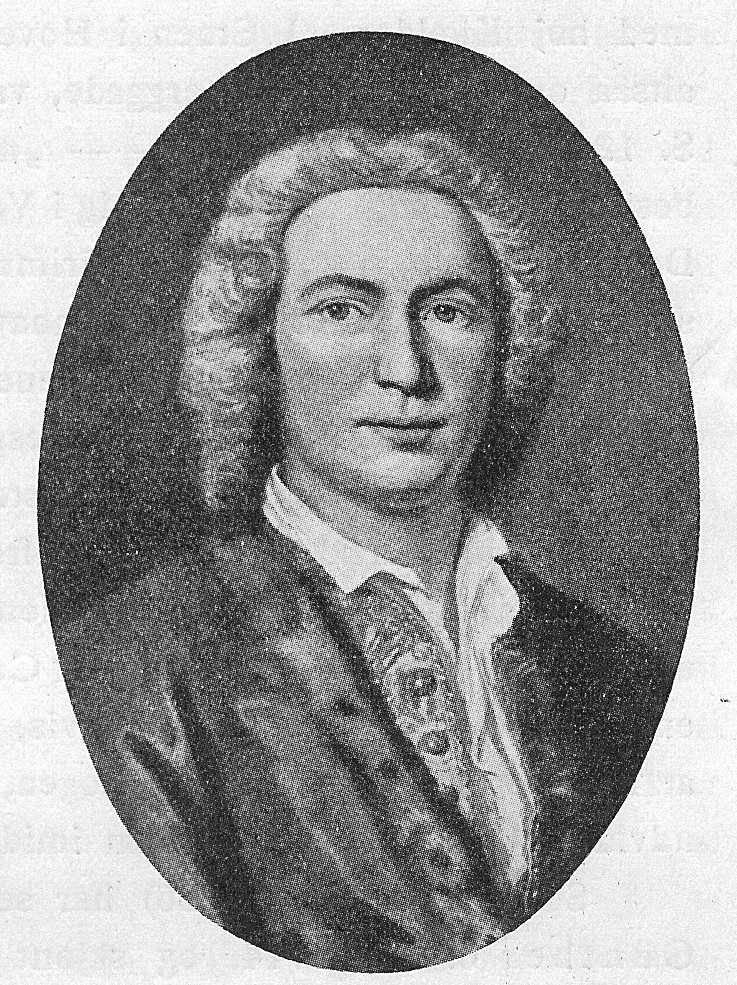
Simon Carl Stanley

Early in his career, Simon Carl Stanley spent over 20 years in England from where his father had emigrated to Denmark. His assignments included work on Compton Place. In 1746 he returned to Denmark, where he became master sculptor at the Holmen naval base as well as a professor at the Royal Danish Academy of Fine Arts. His house at Christianshavn Canal was built in 1755–56, possibly to his own design.

After his father's death, Carl Frederik Stanley, who was also a sculptor and a professor at the academy, lived in the building from 1770 to 1772 and again from 1779 to 1782.

=== Other owners and residents ===
In 1782, Peter Applebye Jr. purchased the building. In 1789, he sold it but continued to live there with his family as a tenant.

In 1793–1798, the property belonged to the British merchant and captain John Christmas, who had settled in Copenhagen in 1790. In 1793 he was courting the young Sophie Dorothea Zinn (1774–1851), who recalled the following scene in her memoirs (Grandmamas Bekiendelser, published 1906):

“Christmas had bought a house and taken much trouble in furnishing it according to the latest fashion. When he came to visit us he always brought samples of silk and batiste and asked my mother and me what we found most suiting for curtains, chairs, couches etc. He always chose the samples I liked, and when his house was finished he gave a ball to inaugurate it. […] His house was most beautifully decorated and I was glad to recognize in curtains, couches etc. the materials I had chosen myself. Furthermore, there were carpets on almost all the floors which at the time was very unusual in Copenhagen. Almost only English was spoken. Even the maid who poured tea, the tea pot, cups, porcelain, knives and forks were English. It seemed to me as if I were in England.”

From 1798 to 1801, ship captain Friderich Friderichs owned it.

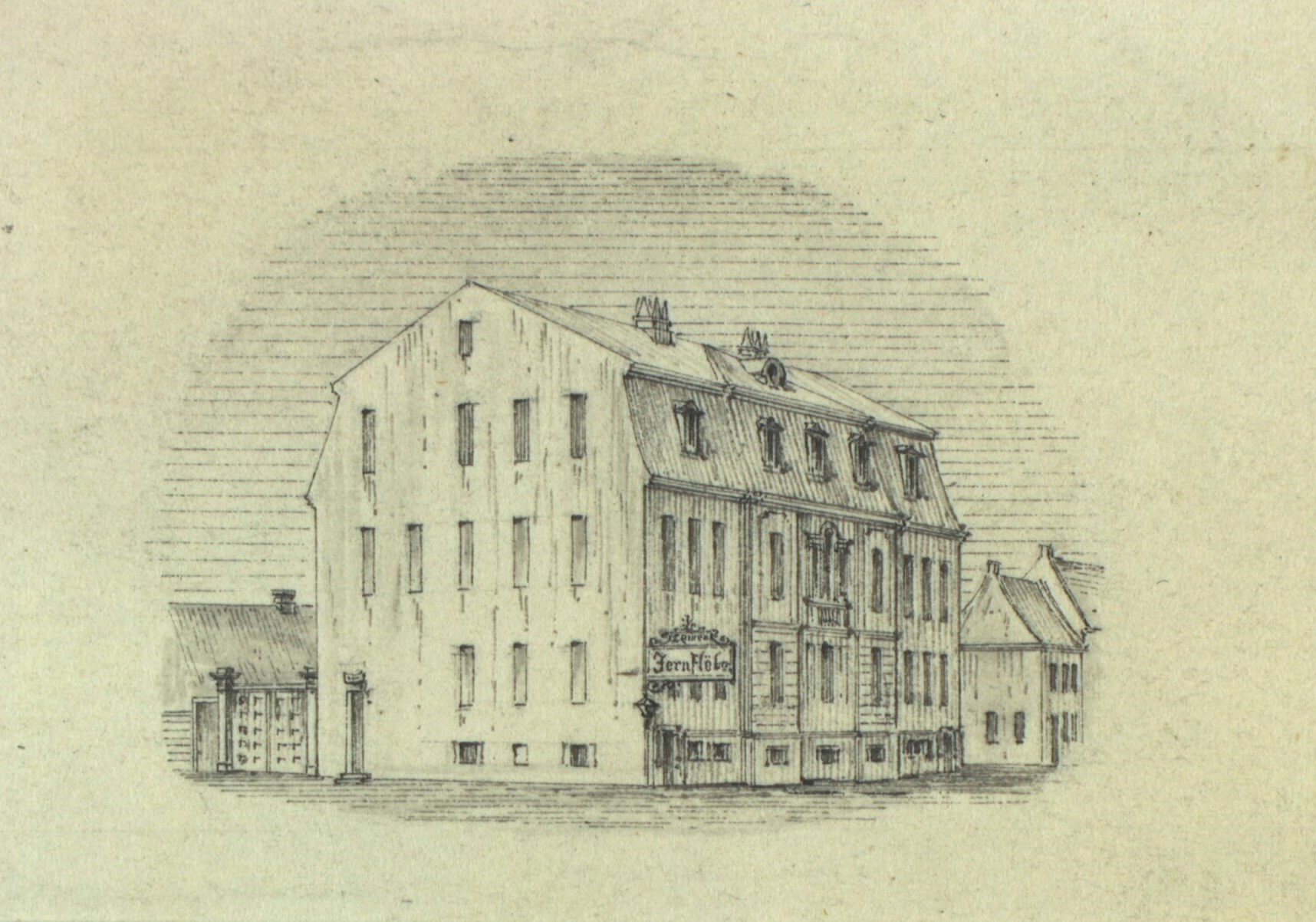
The Stanley House when it was owned by the Löwener family

The Stanley House was in 1801 acquired by ship captain Philip Ryan (1766–1808). He was originally from Saint Croix where his father Henry Ryan was the owner of the sugar plantation Mary's Fancy. Ryan had moved to Copenhagen in 1780 where he initially worked for Duntzfelt, Meyer & Co.. He was licensed as a ship's captain in 1795 and in 1801 started his own trading firm in a partnership with his brother George Ryan.

Stanley's former property was in 1804 purchased by coach maker James Fife. He had come to Denmark to work for a new carriage factory in 1798. In circa 1802, he began trading in new and old carriages out of a remise at Applebyes Plads and by 1804 he was listed as a coach maker at the same address.

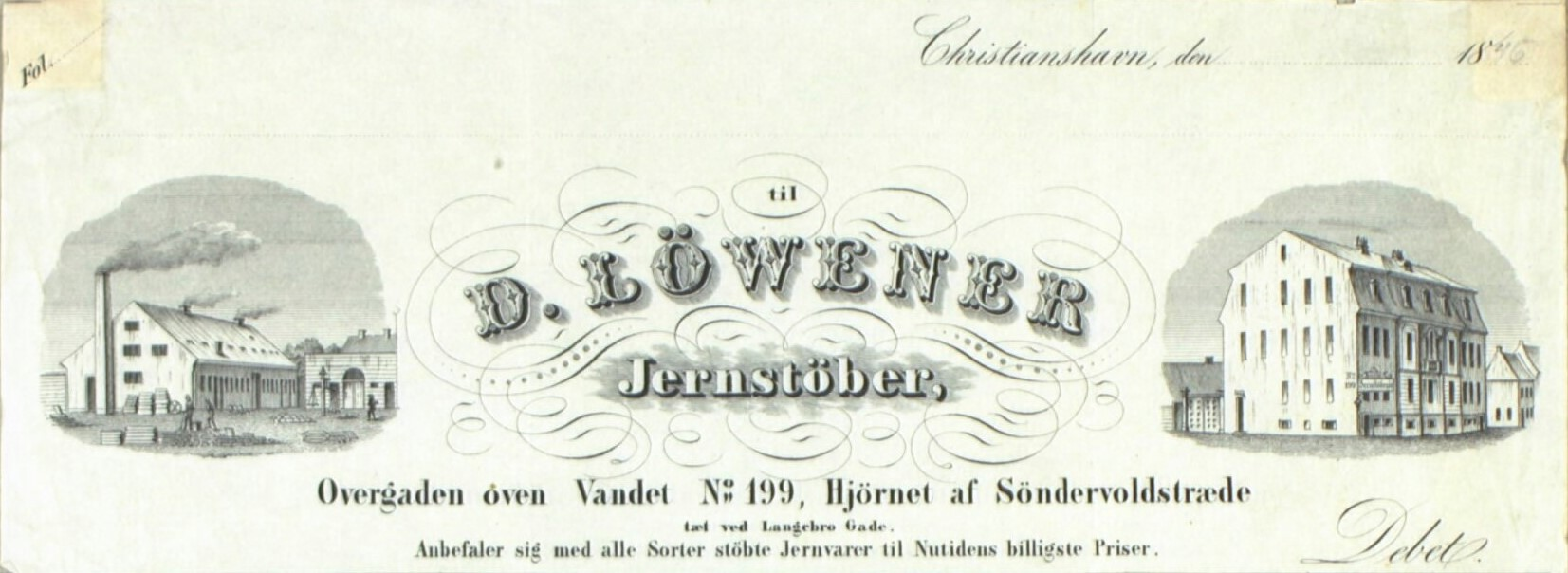
Advert for F. Løwener's Iron Foundry

In the 19th century, the building was owned by Frederik Løwener, owner of an iron foundry, who rented it out to two of Denmark's leading painters of the time. Constantin Hansen lived on the first floor from 1847 until 1856 and P. C. Skovgaard lived in the building from 1851 until 1854 when he moved a little down the street to No. 2.

=== Christianshavn Congregation House ===
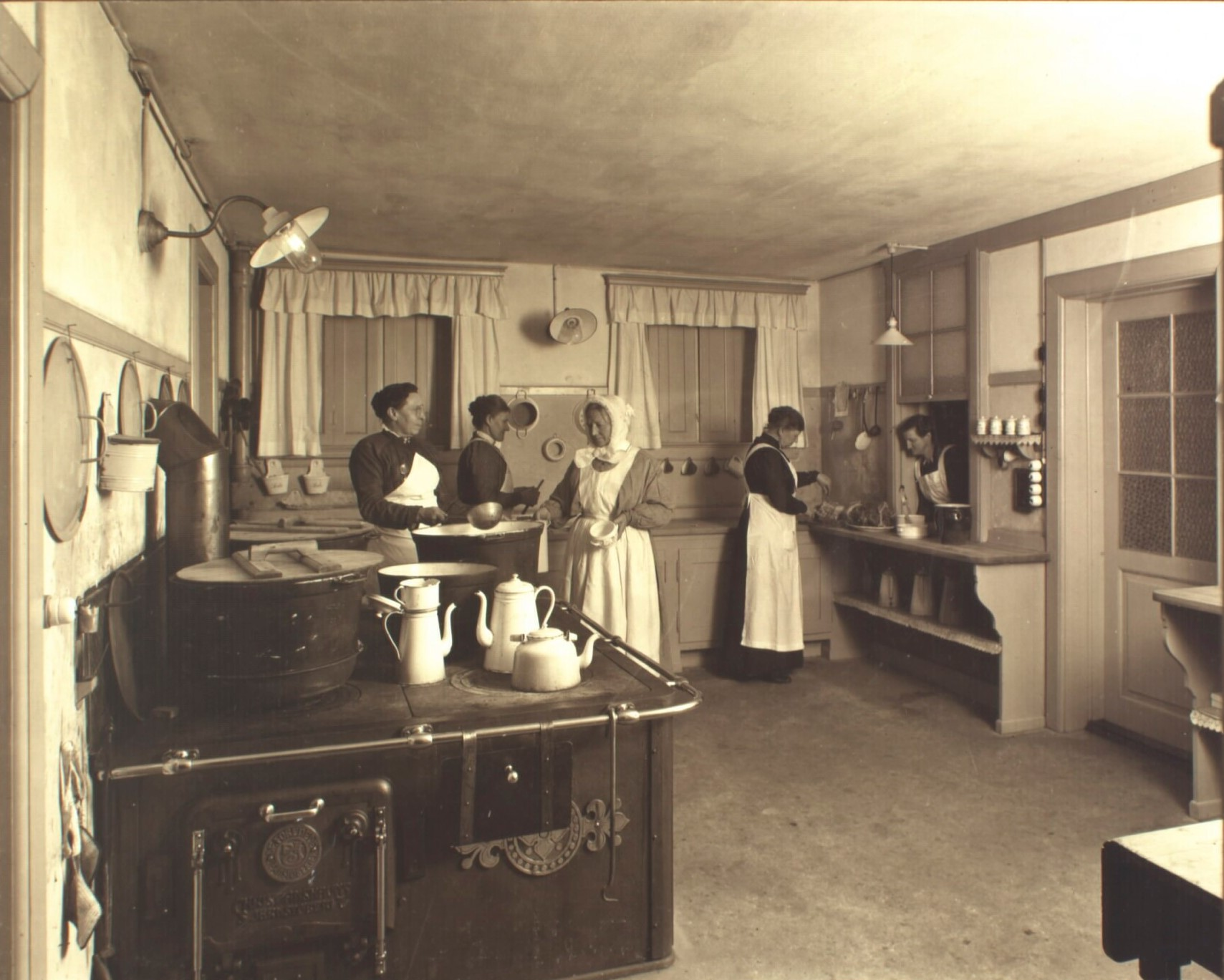
The kitchen in Christianshavn Congregation House

When Christian's Church became a parish church within the Church of Denmark, it needed a venue for its activities in the community and Stanley House was acquired by the congregation on 25 April 1916. The building was renovated and inaugurated as a church centre by Bishop Ostenfeld on Store Bededag 1917.

=== Later history ===
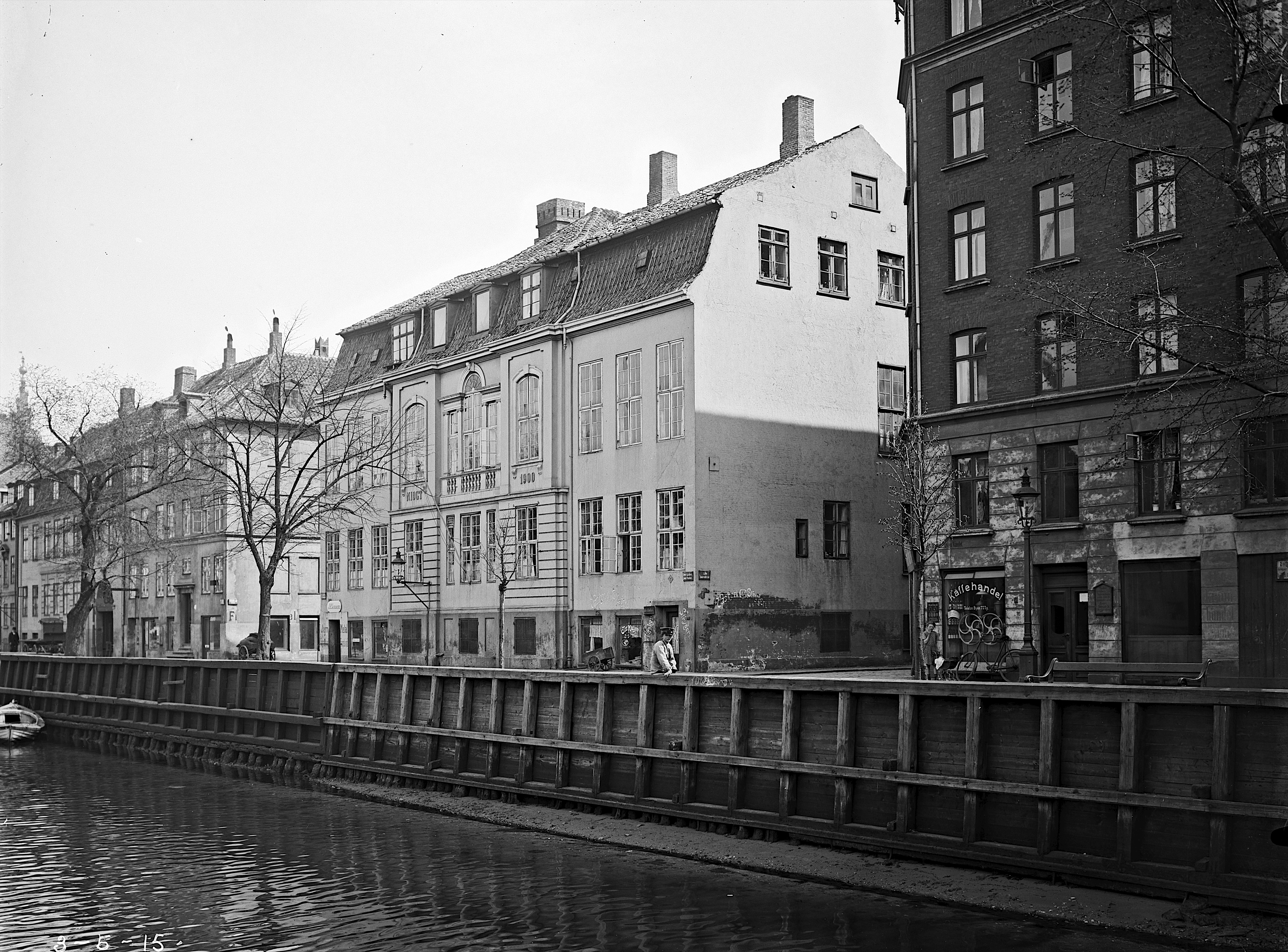
The building in 1915.

Due to the economic burden of running and maintaining the building, it was ceded to Amagerbro Provsti on 1 January 1994 and now serves both Church of Our Saviour and Christian's parish, the two parishes in Christianshavn.

== Architecture ==
The building is designed in Rococo style. Originally, only the central portion of the building stood in full height while the two side wings were of only one storey high until they were extended in 1783. The building now consists of two storeys and a cellar under a mansard roof with black-glazed tiles.

The main facade is decorated with lesenes and has a Palladian window, a rare sight in Danish architecture and a sign of influence from England. The rest of the building relies on Danish traditions and shows influence from Nicolai Eigtved. Constantin Hansen completed interior decorations on doors and panels.

On the rear side of the building, it is connected to a low complex of old industrial buildings which fills the rest of the block bounded by Store Søndervoldstræde, Dronningegade and Lille Søndervoldstræde

== Current use ==
Stanley House now serves as parish house (sognegård) for the Parish of Our Saviour. It contains a residence for the rector at Church of Our Saviour, offices and rooms which can be rented by members of the congregation in connection with funerals.
