= Leth (disambiguation) =

Leth is a Danish surname.

Leth may also refer to:

== People ==
- Leth Graham (1894–1944), Canadian ice hockey player
- Matthew "Leth" Griffin (born 1979), American game designer and marketer

== Other ==
- A fictional clan in the 1976 novel Gate of Ivrel
- Empire Leth, a merchant ship used by the British in World War II

== See also ==
- Leath
- Leith
- Lethe (disambiguation)
