= Hvidovre Church =

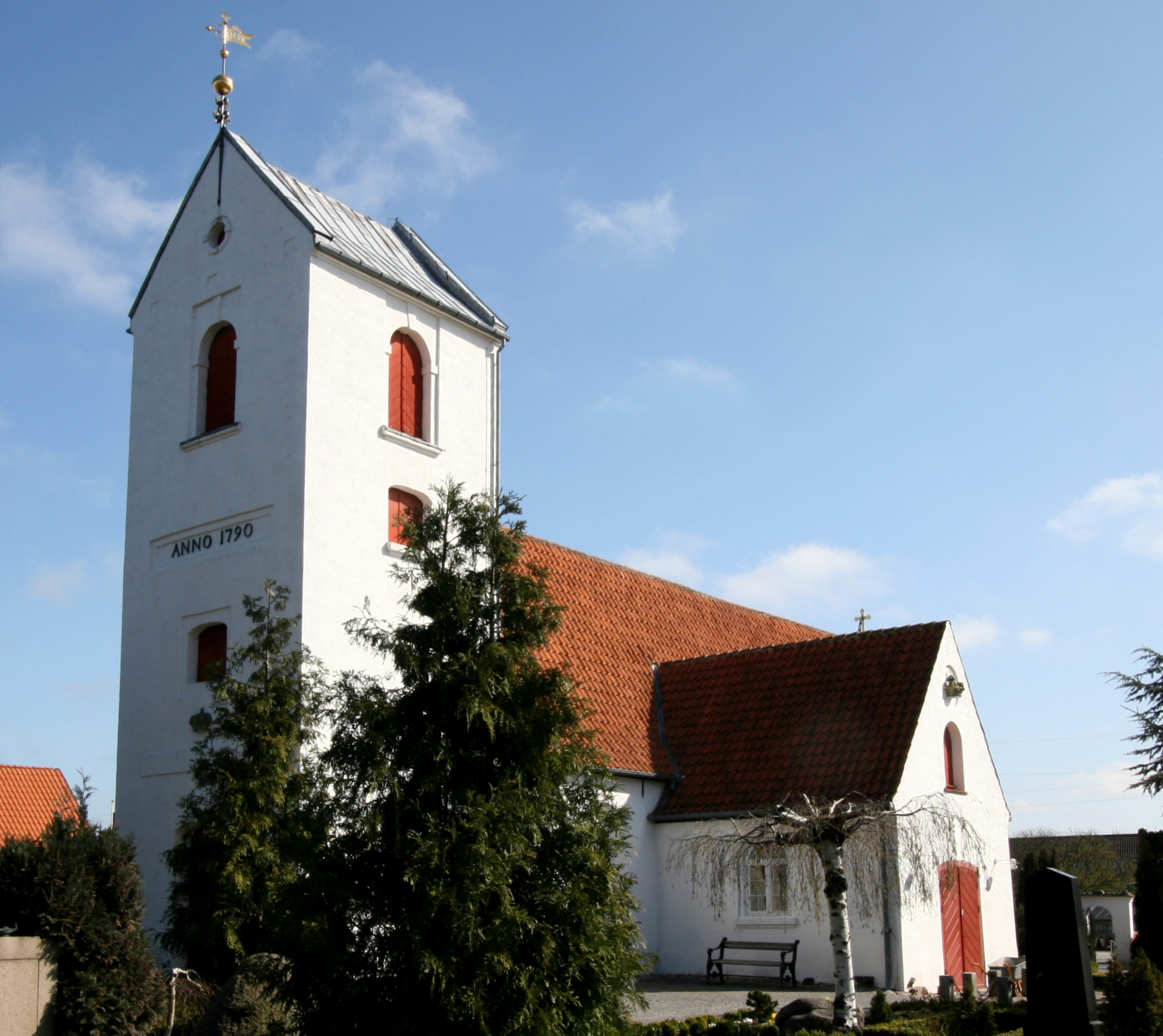
- Hvidovre Church
- 55°39′24.91″N 12°28′21.62″E
- Location: Hvidovre Kirkeplads 2, 2650 Hvidovre; Copenhagen, Denmark
- Country: Denmark
- Denomination: Church of Denmark

History
- Status: Church

Architecture
- Architectural type: Church
- Completed: c. 1150

Specifications
- Materials: Brick

Administration
- Archdiocese: Diocese of Helsingør

Hvidovre Church, located just west of Hvidovre Torv in Hvidovre, is one of the oldest churches in the Greater Copenhagen area and the oldest building in Hvidovre Municipality.

== History ==
The church was built in the Romanesque style. The oldest part of the church is the eastern part of the nave. The chancel was demolished circa 1155 to make room for an expansion at both ends. Part of the church was torn down during the Swedish Wars (1658-1659) and used as building materials for military structures by Swedish troops. The church was rebuilt in 1660.

In 1675 the church was expanded with a side nave to create symmetry in the architecture. The side nave became known as the Valby Nave (Valbyskibet) since it was reserved for the farmers from Valby when they were no longer allowed to attend Church of Our Lady in Copenhagen and did not want to mix with people from Hvidovre.

The first porch, built with timber framing, was replaced by a new one in 1763.

The tower's gable and west wall are decorated with two sandstone crowns. They were originally located on Copenhagen's Western City Gate. It was demolished in 1857 and the crowns were placed on the church in 1886. It had a steeple with three clocks which was removed circa 1790. Its weather vane is now located on the church tower and features Frederick IV's monogram.

The priest's room (præsteværelset) was constructed on the west side of the Valby Nave in 1952.

== Cemetery ==
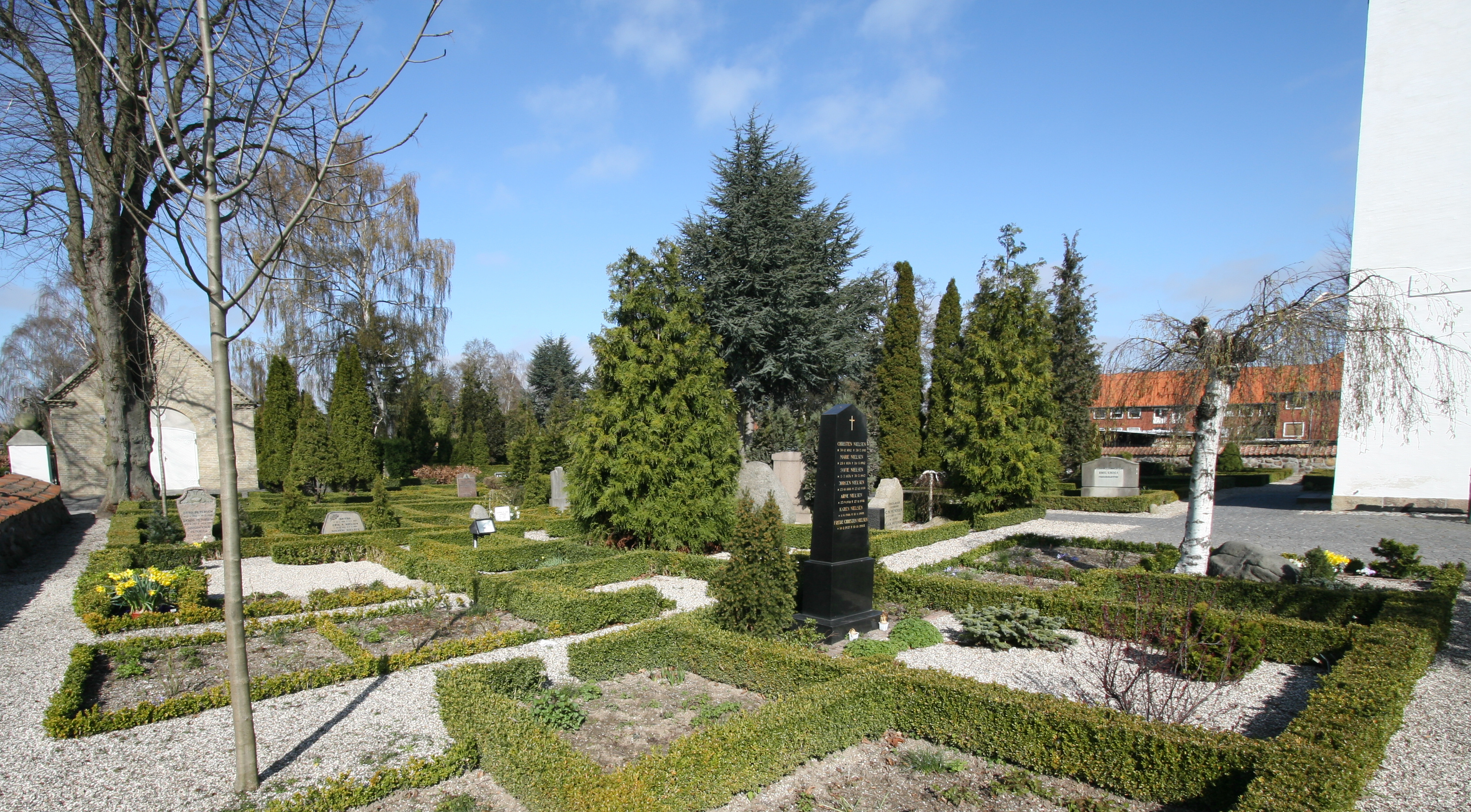
Hvidovre Cemetery

Like other village churches, the church is surrounded by a small cemetery. The oldest surviving grave is from around 1750. A private chapel built in red brick stands at the northern cemetery wall. It was built for a Hvidovre farmer and his wife.

=== Burials ===
- Thøger Birkeland (1922–2011), author
- Bertel Budtz-Müller (1890–1946), poet
- Karen Margrethe Harup (1924–2009), swimmer
- Peter Herman Hoffmark (1907–1987), composer
- Victor Johansen (1888–1967), painter
- Hans Peder Pedersen-Dan (1859–1939), sculptor
- Johanne Pedersen-Dan (1860–1934), actress and sculptor

== Cultural references ==
The church was used as a location in the Bodil Award-winning 1955 World War II drama film Der kom en dag.
