= Leth =

Leth is a Danish surname. Notable people with the surname include:

- Harald Leth (1899–1986), Danish painter
- Jan Leth (1932–2010), Danish artist
- Jørgen Leth (1937–2025), Danish poet and film director, father of Karoline Leth
- Julie Norman Leth (born 1992), Danish racing cyclist
- Karl Leth (born 2002), Danish footballer
- Karoline Leth (born 1964), Danish film and TV producer, daughter of Jørgen Leth
- Kate Leth (born 1988), Canadian comic book creator
- Lasse Norman Leth (born 1992), Danish road and track racing cyclist
- Marie Gudme Leth (1895–1997), Danish textile printer
- Märtha Leth (1877–1954), Swedish pharmacist, first woman in Sweden to graduate as a pharmacist
- Vera Leth (born 1958), Greenlandic ombudsman

== See also ==
- Lethe (disambiguation)
- Lethings, a dynasty of Lombard kings in the 5th and 6th centuries
