= Jens Rostgaard =

Danish soldier, civil servant, judge and antiquarian (1650–1715)

- Born: 24 August 1650; Arrild, Denmark
- Died: 11 November 1715 (aged 65); Copenhagen, Denmark
- Occupations: Soldier, Civil servant, Judge, Antiquarian
- Known for: Fighting the Swedes; Writing the history of Copenhagen
- Spouse: Else Iversdatter

Jens Rostgaard (24 August 1650 – 1715) was a Danish soldier, civil servant, judge and antiquarian, known for leading the militia against the Swedish landing at Humlebæk in 1700, and for writing the history of Copenhagen.

== Biography ==
Rostgaard came from peasant stock. From age 12 he was brought up at the home of his uncle, Hans Rostgaard, a tax collector, who had been rewarded with Krogerup Manor, for his attempt in 1659 to liberate Kronborg Castle from the Swedes during the Second Northern War. Rostgaard went to school in Helsingør, and later served as a clerk under his uncle. In a fight, Rostgaard killed a soldier of the garrison, but was acquitted for manslaughter, both by the local court, and by the Supreme Court. He then served in a regiment from Courland in service of the Dutch Republic, reaching the rank of sergeant. When the Scanian War began, he returned to Denmark, and was commissioned into the Zealand Life Regiment, where he served until 1680, when his resignation was accepted. Rostgaard then served as his old uncle's deputy, until 1684, when he succeeded him in his offices as tax collector and local administrator for Kronborg amt. During the Great Northern War, the Swedish army landed at Humlebæk, and Rostgaard led the local militia in a doomed attempt to stop the superior Swedish forces at the beach. He was rewarded with the position of Rådmand (alderman) in Copenhagen, and was from 1703 war commissary and tax commissioner for Sjælland, Møn, and Lolland-Falster. During the plague outbreak he was one of the commissioners in charge of maintaining a cordon sanitaire around Helsingør. Rostgaard's uncle gave him Nekselø, and he later acquired Farumgård and Sejerø. He collected historical texts, that he used writing the history of Copenhagen, 1168-1711; published posthumously in 1720.

== Rostgaard stones ==
In one of the gables of Damgaarden at Mørdrupvej 96 in Mørdrup is a large natural stone with the inscription "Jens Rostgaard 1691". It was originally located in a low stone wall on the farm but embedded in the wall by a previous owner, probably in the 1880s. It was probably created to mark Krogerup's ownership of the village of Mørdrup. Jens Rostgaard managed the estate until Frederiks Rostgaard became of legal age. Another Rostgaard stone is located in the village of Tibberup but is only inscribed with the year "1697".
