= Lethe (disambiguation) =

Lethe is the river of forgetfulness in Greek mythology. Also in Greek mythology, Lethe (daughter of Eris) is the personification of forgetfulness and oblivion.

Lethe or River Lethe may also refer to:

== Arts and entertainment ==
- Lethe – Episode One, an adventure/survival horror video game released in 2016
- Lethe, a 2020 Ex Silentio album
- A song from the 1995 album The Gallery by the melodic death metal band Dark Tranquillity
- A song from the 2012 album Gamma Knife by the avant-garde metal band Kayo Dot
- "Lethe" (Person of Interest), an episode of the television series Person of Interest
- "Lethe" (Star Trek: Discovery), an episode of the science fiction television series
- Sailor Lethe, a minor character in the Sailor Moon metaseries
- River Lethe, a memory-wipe device in Disney Twisted-Wonderland
- In composer Thomas Adès' String Quartet, "Arcadiana," Op. 12, "Lethe" is the title of the work's seventh and final movement.
- American rock supergroup The Company Band, also featuring Neil Fallon of Clutch, have a song called "Lethe Waters" on their eponymous debut album.
- The Swedish melodic death metal band Dark Tranquillity, released the song "Lethe" in their album "The Gallery" in 1995.
- Black metal band Nightbringer recorded a song called "The River Lethe" on Death and the Black Work
- Black metal band Nocte Obducta recorded an album Lethe.
- Norwegian rock band Motorpsycho have an instrumental song called "La Lethe" on their album The Death Defying Unicorn.
- American experimental rock band Kayo Dot recorded a song entitled "Lethe," featured on their 2012 album Gamma Knife.
- Kristin Hersh has a song titled "Lethe" on her album Possible Dust Clouds.

== Places ==
- Diocese of Lethe, a bishopric of the ancient Roman province of Macedonia Prima
- River Lethe, Alaska, United States
- Lethe (Hunte), Saxony, Germany, a river and a tributary of the Hunte

== Other uses ==
- Lethe (butterfly), a butterfly genus in the family Nymphalidae
- Lethe Press, an American publishing company
- The Lethe stream, a stellar stream that is part of the Milky Way Galaxy

== See also ==
- Leth (disambiguation)
- Lethes, a genus of beetle
- Teatro Lethes, a theatre in Faro, Portugal
