= Kristofferson (disambiguation) =

Kris Kristofferson (1936–2024) was an American singer-songwriter, musician, Rhodes scholar, and film actor.

Kristofferson may also refer to:

- Kristofferson (album), his 1970 debut studio album
- "Kristofferson" (song), a 2008 song by Tim McGraw

== See also ==
- Christoffersen (disambiguation)
