= Hans Rostgaard =

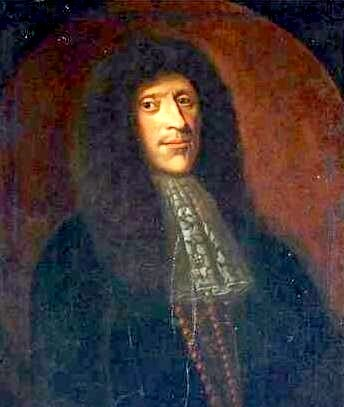
- Born: 15 April 1625; Roost, Denmark
- Died: 31 December 1684 (aged 59); Krogerup, Helsingør, Denmark
- Occupations: Bailiff and landowner

Hans Rostgaard (15 April 1625 – 31 December 1684) was a Danish bailiff (ridefoged) and county administrator (amtsforvalter) at Helsingør who is remembered for his achievement in the Second Northern War and especially his role during the Swedish siege of Copenhagen and subsequent assault on the city in 1659. He is also associated with Krogerup Manor in Humlebæk where a statue of him by Hans Peder Pedersen-Dan was installed in 1904. He was the father of Frederik Rostgaard and the uncle of Jens Rostgaard.

== Early life ==
Rostgaard was born into a peasant family in the parish of Arild, near Haderslev, in Jutland, the son of Ove (Oud) Rostgaard and Kirsten Benneke (Bennik). . He learned to read and write in an early age. At the age of 12, he became a servant in the household of one of Christian IV's servants in Copenhagen. He read many books, both in Danish, German and Dutch. In 1644, he participated in the Battle of Listerdyb and the Battle of Kolberger Heide where his knee was injured. He then worked in the Silver Gallery at Rosenborg Castle for a few years.

He became bailiff of Kronborg Fief in 1656 after his engagement to Kirsten Pedersdatter, the daughter of the estate manager of Københavns Ladegård Peder Christensen Svenske (c. 1590–1657) and Anna Jensdatter (1593–1655). The married on 21 September 1656 at Krogerup.

the daughter of the owner of Krogerup and later took over the estate after his father-in-law's death in 1657.

== Second Northern War activism ==
In 1658, with a regiment of farmers from Helsingør, he twice participated in the defence of Copenhagen. He refused to promise Carl Gustav his loyalty after the Swedish army had occupied Kronborg and was for a while imprisoned but baled out. Together with his wife, he began to smuggle provisions into Copenhagen which was under siege by the Swedish troops. In October 1658, he informed Frederick III about the arrival of Obdam's fleet to the Øresund and began to act as a courier between Obdam and Christoffer Gabel in Copenhagen. In February 1659, he warned the government in Copenhagen about the Swedish plans of an assault on the city and provided it with detailed information about their preparations and dates. Later that spring, together with Lorens Tuxen and Henrik Gerner, he was a central figure in the plans to win back the control of Kronborg. In the forests at Krogerup, he arranged a meeting between the king's servant Corfitz Trolle and the British colonel Hutchinson who supported the plan. He also brought Trolle in contact with Oluf van Steenwinckel and later sneaked him into Kronborg. He received a small Danish army at Krogerup and stationed it with friends in Helsingør. He brought Hutchinson and Steenwinkel the money (1,200 Danish rigsdaler in total) they needed for their participation and escorted Hutchinson's son to Copenhagen as security for his loyalty. When the plan was revealed in June 1659 and many of the involved were arrested, Rostgaard pretended to have died and managed to escape to Copenhagen where he went underground for the next 11 months to protect his wife back in Helsingør.

== Post-war years ==
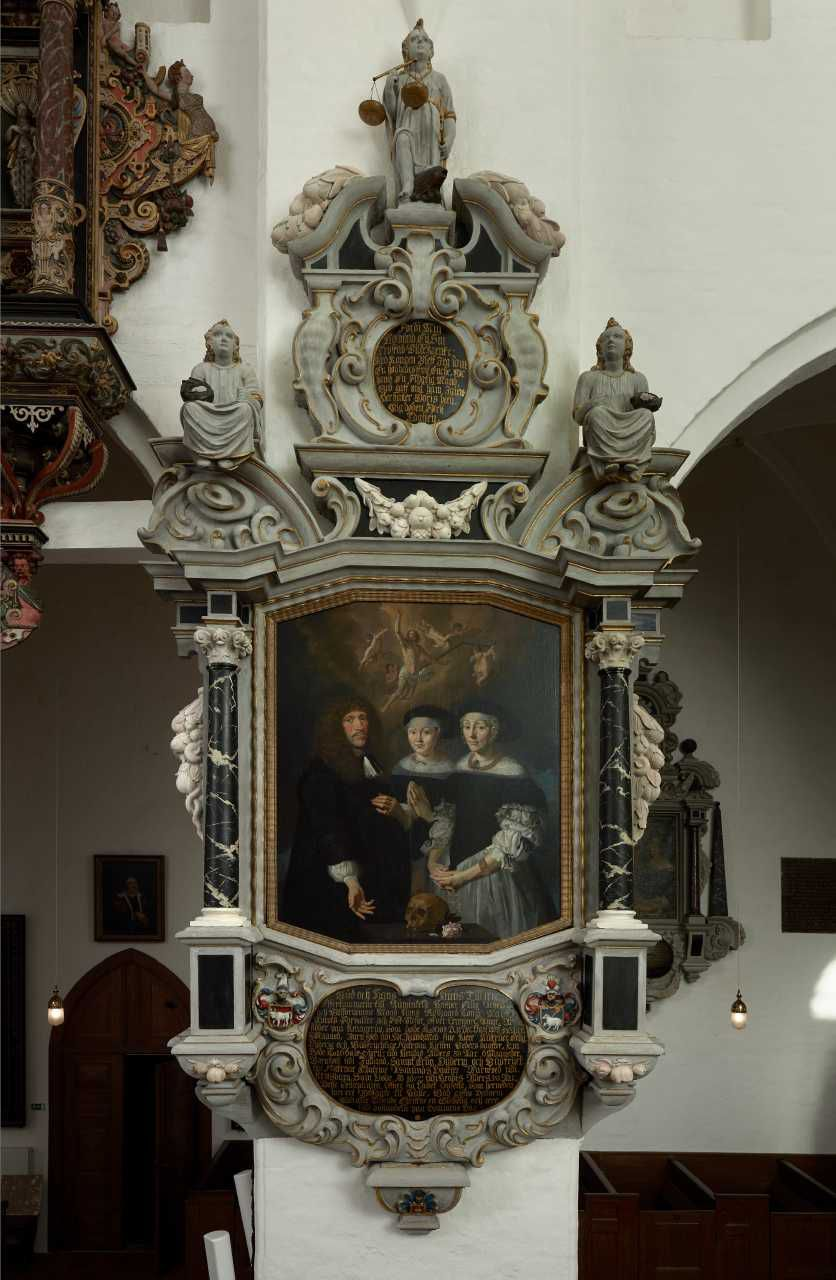
Epitaph to Hans Rostgaard in St. Olai's Church, Helsingør.

Rostgaard was reunited with his wife after the piece in 1660. In March 1661, the couple was rewarded with full ownership of the Krogerup estate as their property, the rights of a noble and a promise of 300 rigsdaler a year for the rest of their lives. Rostgaard also got his position of bailiff back and was also appointed to fishing master of Kronborg Fief later that same year. He also managed Krogerup Ladegård and served as acting prefect (amtmand). In 1663, the crown discontinued his pension as a result of the economically difficult times that had followed after the war. His wife died on 5 April 1668.

He then married Cathrine Asmusdatter on 11 April 1670. She was the daughter of a merchant in Flensburg and had previously been married to the estate manager of Hørsholm Lorens Pedersen. She died after less than two years of marriage on 24 February 1672. In 1670, Rostgaard applied for compensation for the discontinued pension and received a number of minor farms and houses in the vicinity of Krogerup in 1672.

On 2 February 1674, Rostgaard was married for the third time, now to o Dorothea Steffensdatter Rode at Nellerup. She was the daughter of merchant and royal factor Steffen Rode (1587–1638) and had previously been married to royal lighthouse keeper Peder Jensen Grove (1615–73). Through this marriage he became the owner of the island of Anholt in the Kattegat.

In 1681 he was appointed to county manager (amtsforvalter) of Kronborg County.

== Legacy ==
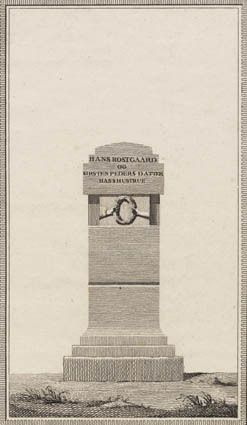
Memorial to Rostgaard and his wife created by Johannes Wiedewelts for Jægerspris Park in 1779-81

Rostgaardsvej in Helsingør was named after him in 1898. A statue by Hans Peder Pedersen-Dan was unveiled at Krogerup Folk High School in 1904.
