= Landing at Humlebæk =

Battle in the Great Northern War

Battle of Humlebæk
- Part of the Great Northern War
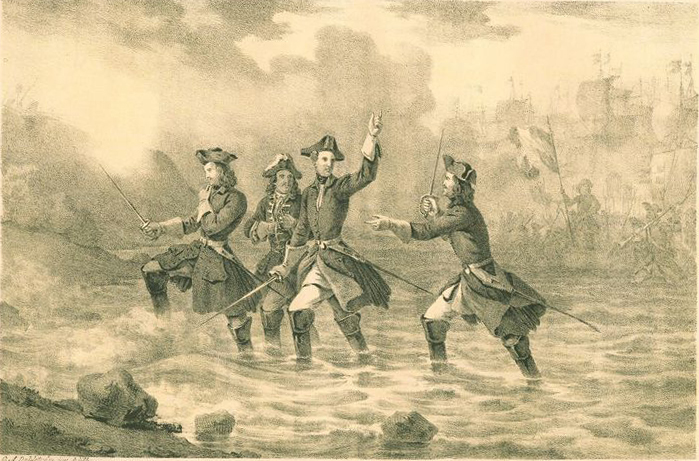
- Charles XII in the landing on Humlebæk, 1700
Date	24 July 1700 (O.S.); 25 July 1700 (Swedish calendar); 4 August 1700 (N.S.)
Location	Humlebæk, Zealand in Denmark
Result	Swedish victory

Belligerents
Swedish Empire	Denmark–Norway

Commanders and leaders
(Swedish Empire) Charles XII of Sweden (Swedish Empire) Cornelius Anckarstjerna (Swedish Empire) Arvid Horn (Swedish Empire) Carl Rehnskiöld	(Denmark–Norway) Jens Rostgaard

Strength
2,500 infantry	350 cavalry 350 infantry 7 guns

Casualties and losses
5 dead, around 15 wounded.	Around 25 killed, some captured and disarmed but later set free.

The Landing at Humlebæk took place on 4 August 1700 (N.S.), commencing the Swedish invasion of Denmark during the Great Northern War 1700–1721. It was the first offensive during the war by the Swedish army, and it was directly led by Charles XII of Sweden commanding the right flank and Arvid Horn together with Carl Gustav Rehnskiöld at the left. The Swedes were victorious and routed the Danish forces led by Jens Rostgaard. Shortly thereafter, Copenhagen was briefly besieged, but Denmark soon signed the Peace of Travendal (7 August O.S.; 18 August N.S.) and exited the war for the next 9 years.

== Background ==
The Swedish king Charles XI had died in 1697. Sweden's competitors, Russia, Denmark-Norway and Saxony-Poland–Lithuania, tried to exploit this by forming a coalition in order to regain their earlier losses. Denmark wanted to reclaim territory lost in the Second Northern War, Russia to get a port to the Baltic Sea, and Saxony–Poland–Lithuania to take back Livonia. This, they supposed, could be easily achieved against the new and inexperienced Swedish king, Charles XII.

However, this new threat Charles had to deal with was averted during the first years of the war due to surprising movements made by the Swedish king's troops, one of them being the landing on Humlebæk, an invasion of Denmark with the aim of capturing Copenhagen undertaken in reaction to the Danish attack on Holstein-Gottorp.

== Prelude ==
About 16,000 Swedish troops were gathered in Scania to launch against Denmark, and another 10,000 just by the Norwegian border. The Swedish fleet went out from Karlskrona to Øresund with their 38 ships of the line. The Danish fleet of 40 ships, however, blocked their pathway in the west entrance of Drogden and forced the Swedish ships to sail another way across to the east by the name of Flintrännan—which at the time was claimed to have been too shallow—but Charles XII gave order that they should try. On 13 July the Swedish ships went over Flintrännan with only 5 ships that ran aground and got stuck, which had to be pulled up.

With the ran-across Flintrännan completed the Swedish ships met up with an English-Dutch combined fleet of 25 ships, commanded by George Rooke. With the Anglo-Dutch fleet laying just outside the island of Ven, the combined fleet pressured the Danish ships and forced them a retreat to Copenhagen where they were utterly under fire and pinned down.

Instead of sending troops to help the occupied Holstein, Charles decided to land on Humlebæk which had been suggested by Carl Magnus Stuart and Hans Wachtmeister. With some minor stratagem, the Swedish fleet tricked the Danish forces on Zealand to believe a major landing would occur at Rungsted instead of Humlebæk.

== Landing ==
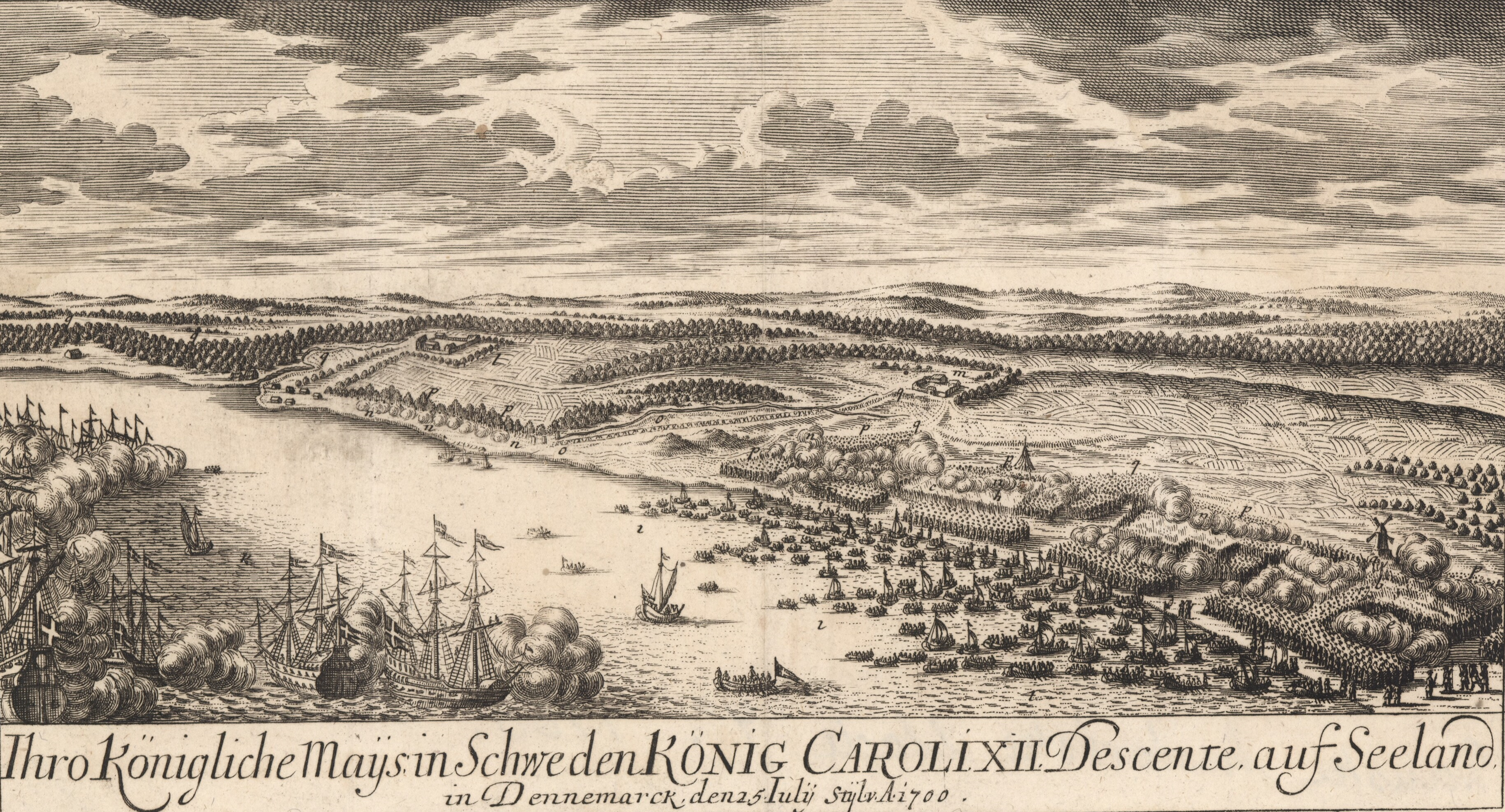
The Landing at Humlebæk, 4 August 1700

Out of 4,700 Swedish soldiers who sailed from Karlskrona, 2,500 would participate in the first wave against the Danish defenders at Humlebæk. The Swedish forces consisted of mostly infantry and were commanded by Charles XII, Arvid Horn and Carl Gustav Rehnskiöld. The Danish forces on Zealand consisted of 5,000 men of which 350 cavalry and 350 peasants were defending the entrenched beach, commander of these were Jens Rostgaard who also had 7 artillery pieces in his favor. There was a light fog and Swedish soldiers were put in small landing boats ready to storm the Danish entrenchment. Meanwhile, the allied fleet bombarded Copenhagen to pin down the Danish troops and ships to not disturb the operation. At 4 August 1700 (N.S.) six o'clock Sweden launched the attack, a cannon strike was heard as a signal, and with supporting fire from nearby ships bombarding the Danish defences, the small landing boats closed in to Humlebæk. First into the water was a lieutenant named Gustaf Henrik Siegroth who jumped in with his men to secure the left flank of the beach, constantly under fire from both Danish muskets, cannons, and water reaching up to their waists, they kept moving, although slowly. The Danish cavalry saw its opportunity to strike and stop the advancing Swedes before reaching the beach, and sent out a squadron of horsemen. The Swedes however, succeeded in keeping their powder dry and with some accurate shots halted their charge, then when reaching shallower water they went in with their bayonets. This forced the Danish cavalry to retreat and the left flank was secured for a landing.

The actions portrayed by Siegroth quickly encouraged the Swedish right flank under the lead of Charles XII who did not hesitate to jump into the water. With the muskets above their heads the Swedish right reached the beach and forced the remaining Danish soldiers to rout, and the landing was secured.

The Swedes built up field redoubts and camps the very next day for the 4,700 troops, their state was however critical; without having any cavalry on shore they were like rats stuck in a corner for any possible Danish assault.

== Aftermath ==
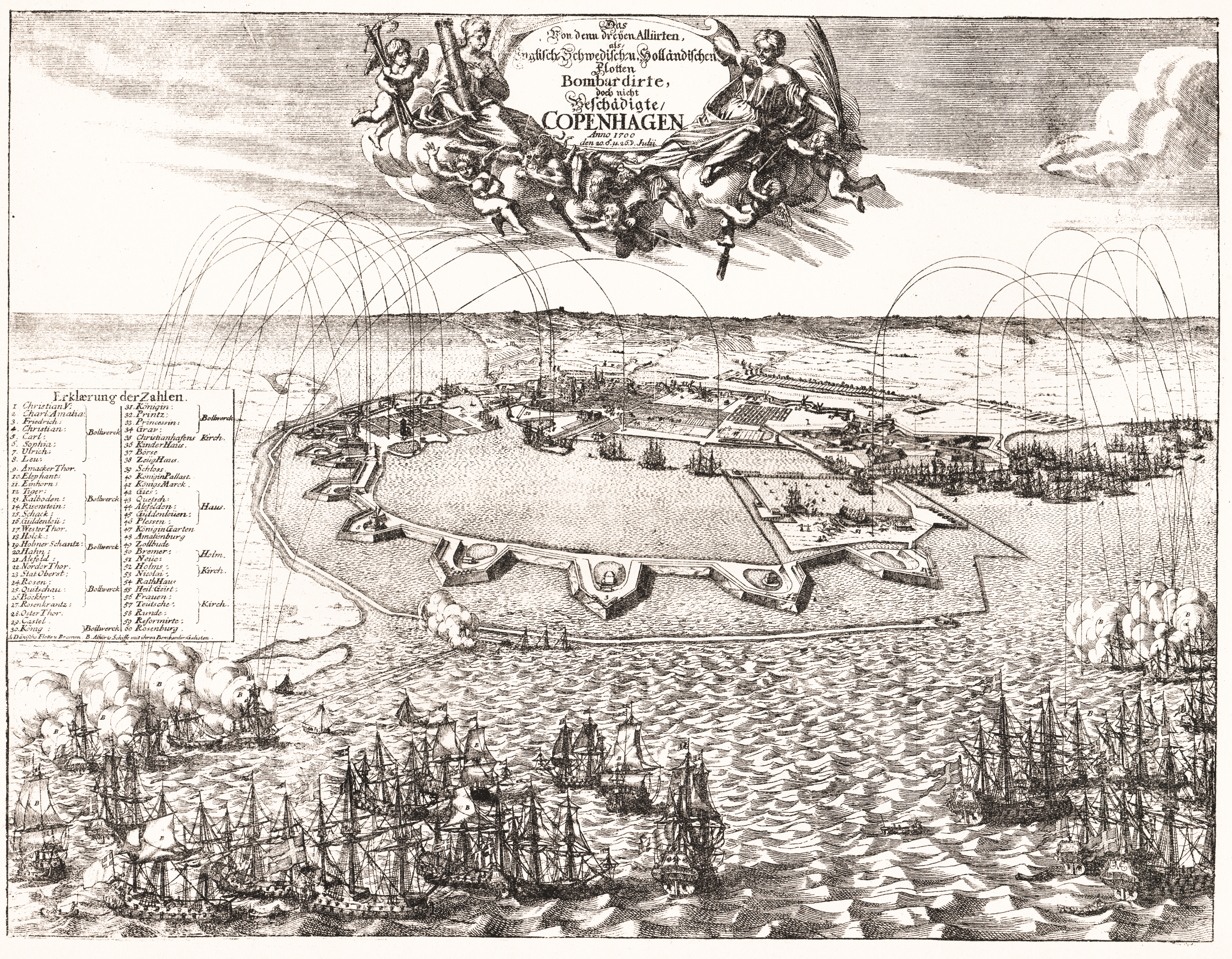
The bombardment of Copenhagen, 1700

After the successful landing on Humlebæk the Danish defences started withdrawing to Copenhagen which had been under fire from the allied fleet. The fleet which had transported the Swedish soldiers were sent back to pick up reinforcements. After some days they arrived with Magnus Stenbock and the force at Humlebæk then reached 10,000 soldiers.

The strategical plan was to lay siege to Copenhagen and force Denmark to surrender, a storm of the city was out of the question since the morale of the Danish forces seemed rather high. Instead it would get bombarded both from sea and land.

However, on 12 August 1700, during his march to besiege Copenhagen, Charles was told that Denmark and Holstein had made peace. He ordered the march to continue until the peace treaty was clearly confirmed. On 23 August, Frederick IV Duke of Holstein-Gottorp messaged the Swedish king that peace really was established according to the terms of the Peace of Travendal (7 August O.S.; 18 August N.S.), and that Denmark would not support the alliance against Sweden in the future.

With one opponent fewer in the war, Sweden went to help the besieged Narva, where they delivered a crushing defeat in the battle of Narva. This forced Russia to retreat and end its Baltic campaign of 1700.

=== Casualties ===
The casualties suffered by both sides are unknown. However it is said Sweden only had one confirmed killed during the landing, and about five to twenty wounded. Another source claims the Swedes to have suffered three killed. The possibility of this is that the two extra killed rather died from their wounds after the battle.

The Danish casualties are a little bit trickier with no real confirmed casualties. It is however claimed that some ten to twenty men were killed and a group of peasants were captured, disarmed but later set free. Even though the landing was not of a major scale, it inflicted a huge blow to Denmark, which was forced to make peace.
