= Hans Peder Pedersen-Dan =

Danish sculptor (1859–1939)

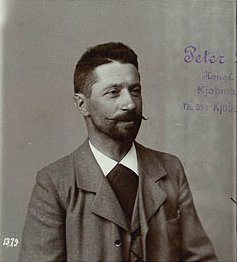
Photograph of Pedersen-Dan by Peter Elfelt.

Hans Peder Pedersen-Dan (1 August 1859 – 21 April 1939) was a Danish sculptor.

== Early life and education ==
Pedersen-Dan was born at Itzehoe in Schleswig-Holstein. He was the son of Ole Pedersen (1820–1902) and Elisabeth Sofie Johansen (1821–1890). After completing his stonemason's apprenticeship, he set out in 1878 to travel Europe as a wandering journeyman. He lived in Rome between 1881 and 1887. He studied at the Royal Danish Academy of Fine Arts of Copenhagen where he was awarded a gold medal in 1898. In 1890 he received the academy scholarship and next year he spent in Paris.

== Career ==
Pedersen-Dans created a number of well-known sculptures. These include the Little Horn-Blower at City Hall Square in Copenhagen (bronze, 1899), the four granite elephants of the Elephant Gate at the Ny Carlsberg brewery in Valby (1901) and a statue of Ogier the Dane for the romantic gardens at Marienlyst House (bronze 1907). The latter was later re-cast in artificial stone at placed in the dungeons underneath Kronborg Castle.

He also designed a monument to Danish volunteers in World War I in Rueil-Malmaison in France and the four statues of queens of the Queens Gate at the new Christiansborg Palace.

== Personal life ==
Pedersen-Dan was married to Johanne Pedersen-Dan (1860–1934) who was an actress before she also turned to sculpturing, in 1888, training under Stephan Sinding. The couple adopted a girl, Rigmor. They lived in Hvidovre Rytterskole in Hvidovre from 1912. He became a Knight of the Order of the Dannebrog in 1898. He died at Hellerup in 1939.

== Works ==
- Michael Drewsen, Silkeborg, (1892)
- The Little Horn-Blower, City Hall Square, Copenhagen (1899)
- Carlsberg Elephants, Carlsberg, Copenhagen (1901)
- Hans Rostgaard, Krogerup Højskole, Helsingør (1904)
- Holger Danske, Kronborg Castle / Skjern (1907)
- A Mother, Hvidovre, Copenhagen (bronze, 1908)
- Christian IX, Nyborg, Denmark (bronze, 1908)
- Christian IX, Christiansborg Palace, Copenhagen (marble, 1908)
- Monument to Danish World War I Volunteers, Rueil-Malmaison, France
- Ismael, Aarhus (1934)

== Gallery ==
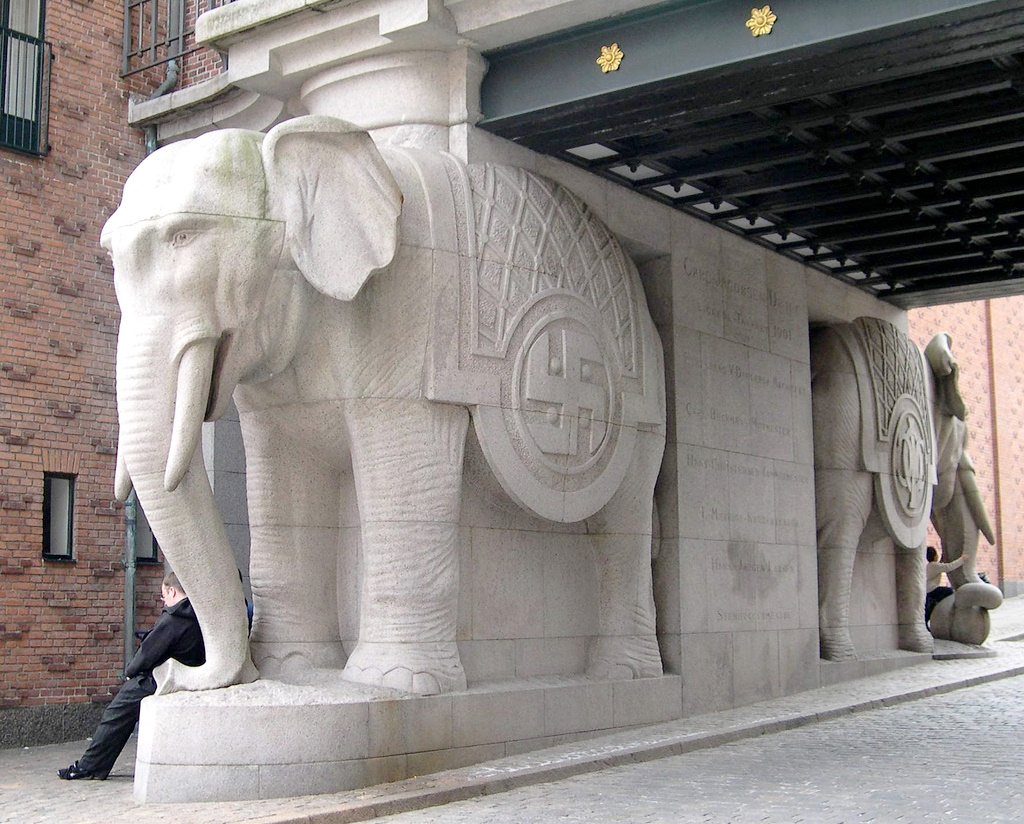
Carlsberg elephants (1901)

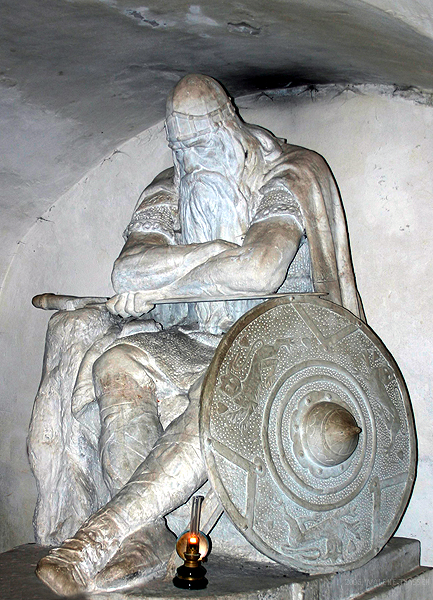
Holger Danske (1907)

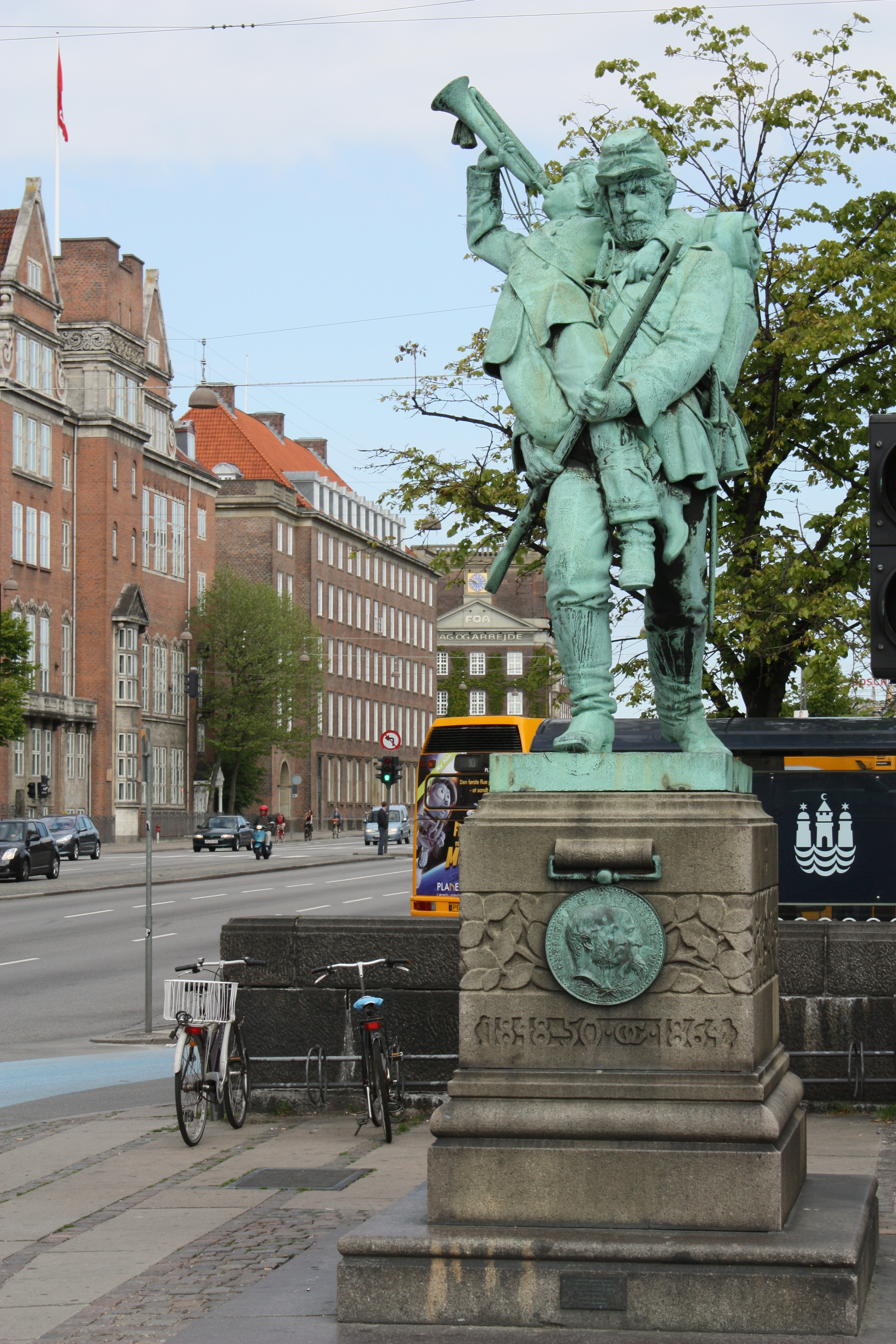
The Little Horn-Blower (1899)

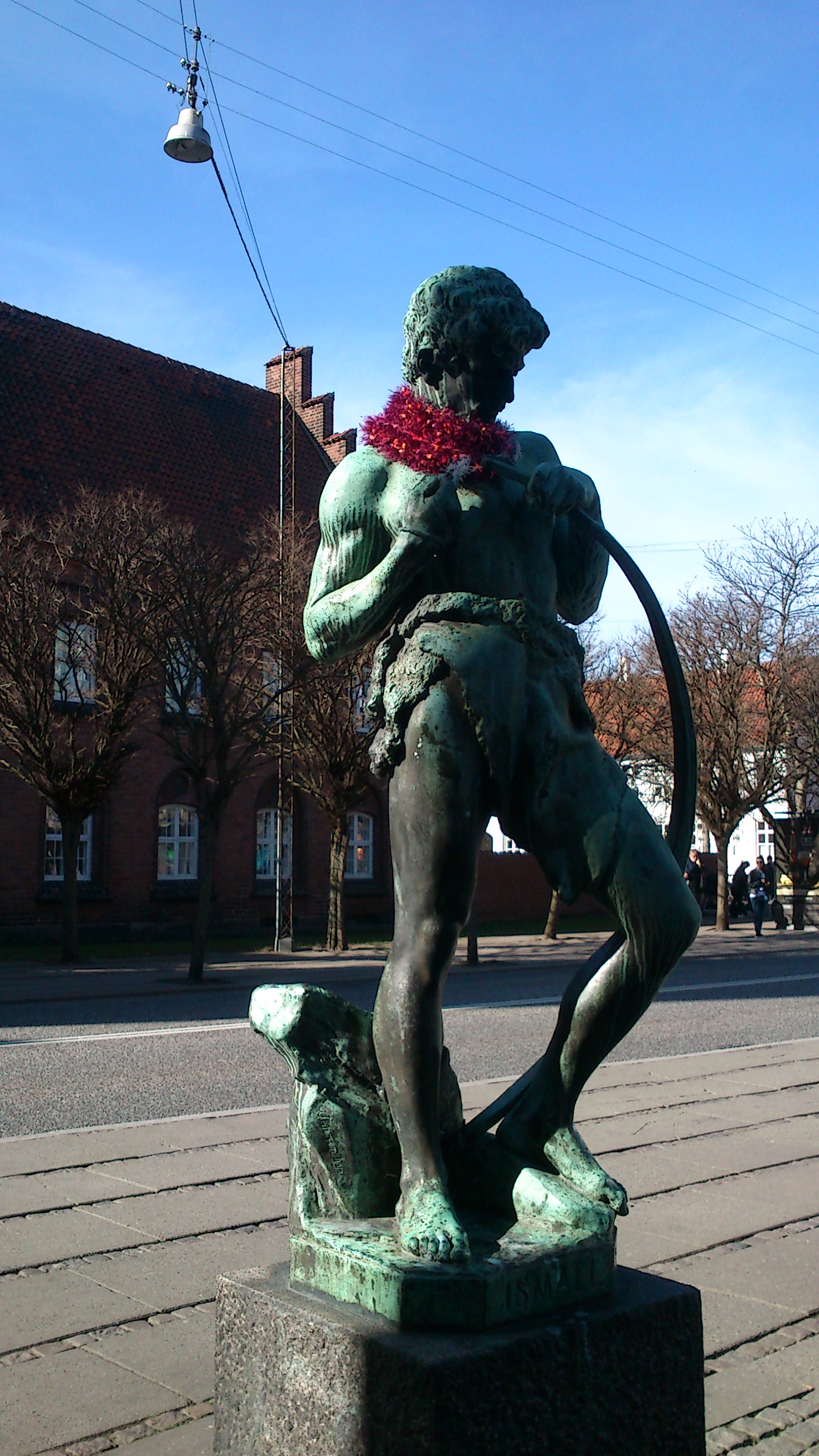
Ishmael with his bow (1934)

== See also ==
- List of Danish sculptors
