= John Christopherson (cricketer) =

English cricketer and cricket administrator

John Clifford Christopherson (1 June 1909 – 8 January 1999) was an English cricketer and cricket administrator. Christopherson played first-class cricket for Cambridge University and for Kent County Cricket Club.

Christopherson was born in 1909 in Blackheath in metropolitan Kent. He attended Uppingham School where he played in the Cricket XI from 1925 to 1928. He went up to Cambridge University and played in the 1929 Freshmen's match and in trial matches as well as for Kent's Second XI in the Minor Counties Championship in 1930 before making his first-class cricket debut for Kent against Derbyshire in May 1931.

Later the same month Christopherson made his first-class debut for Cambridge, playing eight matches during the season and winning a cricket Blue in the University Match. He went on to make a total of 16 first-class appearances. As well as a total of three for Kent, he also appeared four times for HDG Leveson-Gower's XI and once for Free Foresters.

In club cricket Christopherson played for Reigate Priory, setting a club-record highest score of 261 in 1931. He was on the General Committee at Surrey County Cricket Club for more than 20 years before he died at Walton-on-the-Hill in Surrey in 1999 aged 89.

== Bibliography ==
- Carlaw, Derek (2020). Kent County Cricketers, A to Z: Part Two (1919–1939) (PDF). Cardiff: ACS.
