= Ellen Christoffersen =

Greenlandic politician

- Born: Ellen Sharpe Kristensen; March 17, 1972 (age 54); Ikerasak, Avannaata, Greenland
- Occupation: Politician
- Years active: 1997 - 2008
- Political party: Atassut

Ellen Sharpe Christoffersen (née Kristensen; born 17 March 1972) is a Greenlandic politician and member of the Atassut party.

== Biography ==
Ellen Kristensen was born on 17 March 1972 in Ikerasak, the illegitimate daughter of teacher Knud Scharf and Birgithe Kristensen († 1989).

Christoffersen graduated from the Danish folkeskole school system in 1988. From 1993 to 1996, she completed commercial and office training. She was the head of the Atassut youth organization. In 1997 she was elected to the Nuuk Municipality Council. In the 1998 Danish general election, at the age of 25, she ran in the Folketing election and won, ousting Otto Steenholdt, who had been a member of the Folketing since 1977. In the 2001 Danish general election, she appeared again, but the Atassut lost her place. She then ran for parliament in 2002 and was able to move into the Inatsisartut. She was re-elected in the 2005 election. In the 2005 and 2007 Danish elections, she could not assert herself. In early 2008 she resigned her seat in Parliament and left politics for personal reasons. She went on to work as an information coordinator for the Greenland Tourist and Business Council and completed a bachelor's degree in administration and HR at the University College Nordjylland. As of February 1, 2018, Christoffersen was employed as a personnel manager in Sermersooq.
