= Ex Silentio =

Music emsemble

- Origin: Thessaloniki, Greece
- Genres: Early music, medieval, baroque
- Years active: since 2001
- Label: Carpe Diem Records
- Members: Dimitris Kountouras; Fanie Antonelou; Theodora Baka; Thimios Atzakas; Elektra Miliadou; Andreas Linos; Fani Vovoni; Flora Papadopoulou; Iason Ioannou; Markellos Chryssikopoulos; Dimitris Tigkas; Nikos Varelas
- Website: www.exsilentio.org exsilentio.bandcamp.com

Ex Silentio is the Greek early music ensemble, that has a wide repertoire from medieval music up to baroque. Ex Silentio appears regularly in festivals and venues in many European countries and focuses on music from Southern Europe and the Mediterranean as well as on Orient-Occident music relations. Band's first album, Mneme, received the Pizzicato's journal prize and was shortlisted for the International Classical Music Awards in 2016.

== History ==
Ensemble was founded in 2001 and is specialized in early music and historical performance practice. The director is a flute-player Dimitris Kountouras. Ex Silentio has performed in musical theatre and contemporary dance productions of the Athens Festival and the Athens International Dance Month. They had also performed in festivals and chamber music concert series in Greece and around Europe, including the “Musica antica del Mediterraneo” in Bari, the “Marco Fodella” concert series in Milan, the Greek Institute of Berlin, the “Musica Antiqua da Camera” in the Hague, the summer “Alte Musik in St. Ruprecht” in Vienna, the Μοzaik Project in Albania, the 1st Early Music Festival in Nicosia, at the Athens and Thessaloniki Concert Halls (Megaron), the Athens Festival, the Renaissance Festival in Rethymno, the Festival Guitar Plus, the Music Days of Rhodes etc. Ex Silentio has recorded for the record companies “Talanton” (works by Guillaume Du Fay and 15th-century secular music) and “Carpe Diem” Records (Mneme - Medieval music from the Mediterranean, won the Pizzicato Magazine Supersonic prize, and was shortlisted for the International Classical Music Awards in the Early Music category in 2016). Ex Silentio is based in the Athens Conservatory. Members of the band teach at the international music community “Music Village” in Pelion.

== Albums ==
=== Mneme (2015) ===
The album features cantiga songs by the famous Spanish king-composer Alfonso X. Along with this, a few instrumental pieces, like the popular dance Saltarello from the London / Tuscan manuscript (an important archive of medieval Italian music), are included. The album also features compositions from the XIV-XV centuries - from Sephardim, Arabs and Greeks.

=== Lethe (In the Courts of the Orient) (2020) ===
Lethe (Greek: λήθη, Greek for "oblivion"), includes El Rey de Francia, a Sephardic ballad in Ladino (also known as The King's Daughter's Dream), The Nisabur and the Bestenigar pesrevs, from the collection of Dimitrie Cantemir (1673–1723), and Murabba, an old Ottoman song included in the collection of Ali Ufki (1610–1675). Mahur semai is a later example of instrumental Ottoman music from the 19th century.

== Ensemle members ==
=== Main ===
- Fanie Antonelou, voice
- Theodora Baka, voice
- Thimios Atzakas, oud
- Elektra Miliadou, fiddle
- Andreas Linos, viol
- Fani Vovoni, violin
- Flora Papadopoulou, harp
- Iason Ioannou, cello
- Markellos Chryssikopoulos, harpsichord & organ
- Dimitris Tigkas, violone & viol
- Nikos Varelas, percussion
- Dimitris Kountouras, direction & recorder/flute

=== Guest artists ===
- Tobias Schlierf, voice & hurdy-gurdy
- Sokratis Sinopoulos, lyre

== Discography ==
Title	Details	Track list
Talanton (Nell' autunno di Bisanzio)	Released: 2010	
Mneme	Released: September 2015; Label: Carpe Diem Records; Format: Compact Disc (CD) + Digital Album	No. / Title / Length; 1. / "Da que deus mamou" / 2:09; 2. / "Rosa das Rosas" / 9:22; 3. / "Saltarello - Trotto" / 4:32; 4. / "Puncha Puncha" / 5:35; 5. / "Lammabada Yatathanna" / 6:46; 6. / "Zonaradikos" / 2:15; 7. / "De Poni Amor" / 2:47; 8. / "Ghaetta" / 8:01; 9. / "Aras pot hom" / 7:21; 10. / "Castle of Astropalia" / 11:16
Nefeli (Music of the Troubadours at the Kingdom of Thessalonica)	Released: 2017	
Lethe	Released: October 2020; Label: Carpe Diem Records; Format: Compact Disc (CD) + Digital Album	No. / Title / Length; 1. / "El Rey de Francia (Sephardic traditional)" / 5:36; 2. / "Nisabur Pesrev (Dimitrie Cantemir (1673-1723))" / 5:03; 3. / "Murabba (Ali Ufki (1610-1675))" / 6:01; 4. / "Bestenigar Pesrev (Dimitrie Cantemir)" / 7:00; 5. / "Mahur Semai (Nikolaki Kemenceci (19th c.))" / 6:53; 6. / "No M'agrad (Raimbaut de Vaqueiras (?-1207))" / 9:12; 7. / "Planh (improvisation)" / 1:36; 8. / "Se brief retour (Codex Ms Torino, J.II.9)" / 5:07; 9. / "Quant me souvient (Codex Ms Torino, J.II.9)" / 3:20; 10. / "Douce Biauté (Codex Ms Torino, J.II.9)" / 3:48; 11. / "J'ai mon cuer mis (Codex Ms Torino, J.II.9)" / 6:04
Music from the Court of Lusignan. The Codex of Cyprus	Released: 2021; Format: CD; ISBN: GS1-5214002414016	No. / Title / Length; 1. / "Le mois de mai" / 3:29; 2. / "Il ne sait pas" / 4:29; 3. / "Il s'empeche de folie" / 9:33; 4. / "Qui n'a le cuer rainpli" / 3:04; 5. / "La douceur de vostre biau vis" / 4:10; 6. / "Tout vrais solas feray" / 4:43; 7. / "Je la remire" / 3:42; 8. / "Je vous supli tres douce" / 8:00; 9. / "Hymn (instrumental)" / 1:50; Personnel: Fanie Antonelou - voice, Flora Papadopoulos - gothic harp, Elektra Miliadou - fiddle, Nikos Varelas - percussion, Dimitris Kountouras - recorder & direction
