= Lethes =

Scientific classification
- Kingdom: Animalia
- Phylum: Arthropoda
- Class: Insecta
- Order: Coleoptera
- Suborder: Polyphaga
- Infraorder: Cucujiformia
- Family: Cerambycidae
- Tribe: Acanthocinini
- Genus: Lethes; Zayas, 1975

Genus of beetles

Lethes is a genus of beetles in the family Cerambycidae, containing the following species:

- Lethes humeralis Zayas, 1975
- Lethes indignus Zayas, 1975
- Lethes israeli Zayas, 1975
- Lethes turnbowi Lingafelter, 2020
- Lethes x-notatus Vlasak & Santos-Silva, 2021
