= Jan Leth =

Danish artist

Jan Leth Aagensen (20 August 1932 - 6 October 2010) was a Danish artist. Born in Elsinore, Jan Leth was trained as a painter. He made a name for himself as a lithographic artist, and later became known for his sculptures.

== Education and background ==
Jan Leth's formal training took place at the Royal Danish Academy of Fine Arts, headed by professor Søren Hjorth Nielsen, from 1965 to 1969. His first exhibition was in 1961 at Kunstnernes Forårudstilling (The Artists Spring Exhibition). He is a member of various artistic groups: Decembristerne, Kunstnersamfundet og Foreningen Danske Grafikere, the Association of the Royal Danish Academy of Fine Arts, and the Association of Danish Printmaking Artists.

== Exhibitions and permanent representations ==
Jan Leth has participated in various solo and group exhibitions, presenting paintings, sculptures, drawings, and installations in Denmark and abroad. He has received many honours and grants throughout his life. The Danish State gave him a lifelong economic grant in 1998. His work is represented in gallery collections in Denmark and internationally.
