= Dorthe Kristoffersen =

Dorthea (Dorthe) Rebekka Augusta Kristoffersen née Jakobsen (4 January 1906 – 1976) was a Greenlandic artist from the country's west coast. A talented craftswoman who had previously embroidered skins and created dolls, after her marriage with Kristoffer Kristoffersen (1902–1970), she concentrated on creating small mythological figures in local soapstone. Her works have been exhibited in Denmark and can be seen in the Greenland National Museum in Nuuk.

== Biography ==
Born in Atammik on 4 January 1906, Dorthea Rebekka Augusta Jakobsen was the daughter of the hunter Pavia Johannes Timotheus Jakobsen (born 1879) and his wife Bertheline Augustine Thamar née Poulsen (born 1878). On 11 September 1927 in Nuuk, she married Kristoffer Kristoffersen (1902–1970) with whom she had four children: Simon (1933–90), Sara (1937–2008), K'itura (1939) and Karl (1943).

With her family in Atammik, Dorthe Kristoffersen had become a competent craftswoman working with a variety of materials, not only creating figures in soapstone but working with sealskin and embroidery, often crafting dolls. After her marriage, together with her husband and four children at their Myggedalen home in Nuuk, she concentrated on sculpting small figures in soapstone, darkened with wax. In addition to her warm depictions of family life, especially miniatures of one or more women with top-knotted hair, her sculpture of Greenland's Mother of the Sea represents a winged mermaid in a kneeling position with a large seal on her back, tenderly kissing one of the two small children beside her. Some of her softly-formed figures appear to have been influenced by the Dorset culture with strongly rooted noses in their faces. Together with her husband and her four children, the Kristoffersen family acted as a kind of artists commune, working closely together on soft, rather lumpy figures, frequently in small groups, at play or evoking an old legend.

Kristoffersen's artworks were exhibited in Aarhus and in Copenhagen in 1974. Her sculptures including the Mother of the Sea (1972), a mythological figure (1974) and Mother with Three Children are permanently exhibited in the Greenland National Museum in Nuuk.

Dorthe Kristoffersen died in Nuuk in 1976.
