= Sara Kristoffersen =

Greenlandic artist

Sara Rachel Juliane Kristoffersen (1937–2008) was a Greenlandic artist from the country's west coast. Her parents, Dorthe and Kristoffer Kristoffersen, taught her and her three siblings how to create small mythological figures in dark soapstone from a local quarry. Her works were exhibited at the National Museum in Copenhagen and at the central library in Gladsaxe in the early 1990s. Other can be seen today in Nuuk's Galleri Enoksen.

== Biography ==
Born in Nuuk on 18 December 1937, Sara Rachel Juliane Kristoffersen was the daughter of the hunter Kristoffer Mathæus Gert Kristoffersen (1902–1970) and Dorthea Rebekka Augusta née Jakobsen (1906–1976), later known as Dorthe Kristoffersen. (1943).

Like her three siblings, Simon (1933–90), K'itura (1939) and Karl (1943), she was trained as a sculptor by her parents. She sculpted small figures in dark soapstone from a neighbouring quarry, some quite realistic like the trapper dragging a heavy seal by a line strung over his shoulder which is in the collection of National Museum of Denmark. Others, like the legendary qivittoq with an exceptionally large ear (1974), are more grotesque. It is believed the qivittoq needed good hearing as they wandered in the mountains, often communicating with the animals. The members of the family worked together as a kind of compact art colony, all creating small, rather lumpy figures. Sara Kristoffersen appears to be the one most interested in creating mysterious figures based on local legends.

Other works by Kristoffersen were exhibited at the central library in Gladsaxe in 1993. They include a mother with a child and a man carrying another on his shoulders. Further examples of her work can be seen at the Gallery Enoksen in Nuuk.

Sara Kristoffersen died in 2008.
