= K'itura Kristoffersen =

- Born: November 29, 1939 (age 86); Nuuk
- Other name: K'itura Bebiane Ane Salomine Sukuvara
- Occupation: sculptor

K'itura Bebiane Ane Salomine Sukuvara née Kristoffersen (born 1939) is a Greenlandic artist from the country's west coast. Her parents, Dorthe and Kristoffer Kristoffersen, taught her and her three siblings how to create small mythological figures in dark soapstone from a local quarry. Together with her brother Karl, in 1992 she was trained in crafting granite by the Japanese artist Jun Ighi Inoue. Her work has been exhibited in Denmark and Greenland.

== Biography ==
Born in Nuuk on 29 November 1939, K'itura Bebiane Ane Salomine Kristoffersen was the daughter of the hunter Kristoffer Mathæus Gert Kristoffersen (1902–1970) and Dorthea Rebekka Augusta née Jakobsen (1906–1976), later known as Dorthe Kristoffersen. On 17 November 1960, she married the Norwegian Sami reindeer herder and hunter, Edvind Marius Sukuvara (born 1928).

Like her three siblings, Simon (1933–1990), Sara (1937–2008) and Karl (1943), she was trained as a sculptor by her parents. She frequently adopts the mother and child motif, often depicting the mother standing upright with a child on her back while an older child stands before her.

In the early 1990s, thanks to Bodil Kaalund, together with her brother Karl, she spent three weeks on the island of Bornholm learning how to craft works in granite. At the time, she regretted the old family collaboration where the parents and children worked together on creating their individual miniature sculptures. The family had worked together creating soft, rather lumpy figures, frequently in small groups, at play or evoking an old legend.
