= Simon Carl Stanley =

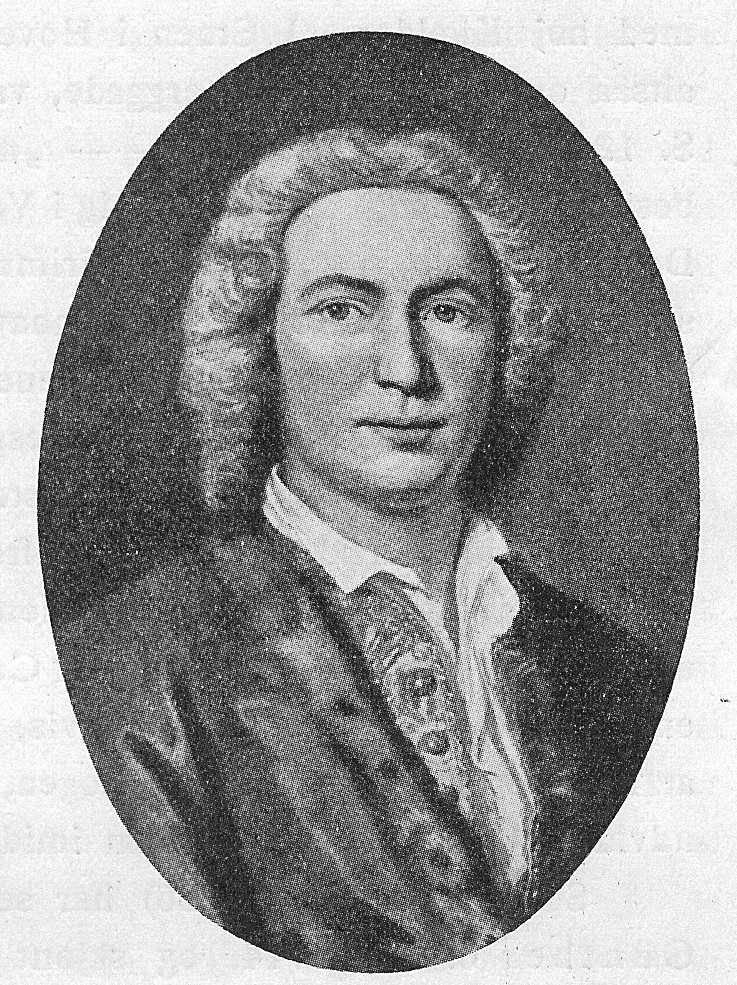
- Simon Carl Stanley by Karl Ludvig Tørrisen Bugge
- Born: 12 December 1703; Copenhagen, Denmark
- Died: 17 February 1761 (aged 57); Copenhagen, Denmark
- Known for: Sculpting
- Movement: Neo-Classicism

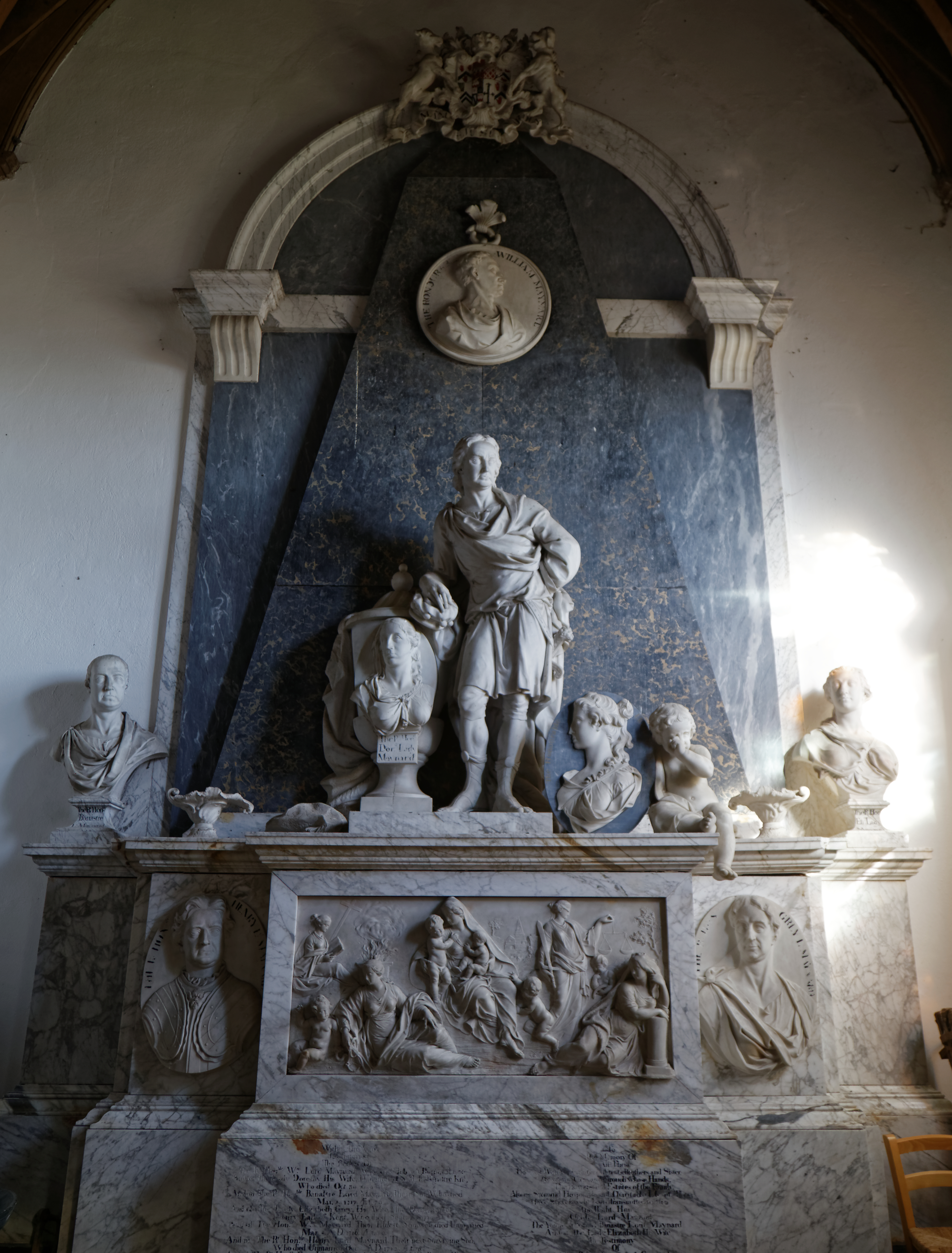
Maynard family monument by Charles Stanley in the Church of St Mary in Little Easton, Essex

Simon Carl Stanley, known in England as Charles Stanley (12 December 1703 – 17 February 1761), was a Danish sculptor of English parentage.

== Life ==
He was born in Copenhagen on 12 December 1703 to English parents.

As a boy he liked drawing and wood-carving, and around 1715 was apprenticed to J. C. Sturmberg. In his apprenticeship he created, amongst other things, two angels for Privy Krabbe's tomb at Roskilde Cathedral, and also helped with the stucco decorations at Fredensborg Palace.

To learn more, he went abroad visiting several cities in Germany and then travelled to Amsterdam, where he sought training with Van Luchtern. In 1727 he travelled to England and while in London worked for sculptors Laurent Delvaux from Ghent and Peter Scheemakers from Antwerp, the latter of which had also heard of Sturmberg's pupils. Later Stanley's self-employment and paling among other decoration of Lord Wilmington castle in Sussex, as he also did some major monuments. In 20 years, Stanley was in all England, he had 2 times married. His first wife, born Anna Allen, a tenant farmer's daughter from Sussex, whom he had married in 1730, had died after 5 years of marriage, and he had then in 1737 married a pastor's daughter from Hanover, Magdalene Margrethe Lindemann, who was the mother of 2 sons, one of which is the sculptor Carl Frederick Stanley.

Stanley had hardly thought of ever returning to Denmark, when he carried a notice from Copenhagen, Commander Gerner, who visited London, got a call there. Since both he and his wife agreed, wrought Gerner after his return through the county Danneskjold that King Christian VI of Denmark called Stanley and sent him raise money. Just as this was about to leave London, came after notification of the death of the king, but he nevertheless went away and after his arrival in Copenhagen gracious received by King Frederik V of Denmark, which awarded the artist an annual pension, gave him the promise of space as the fleet sculptor and let him assign a block of marble, that he might show them a sample of his art. Stanley was now a small group: "Vertumnus, Pomona and Cupid" (1749), a graceful rococo cabinet piece, which was bought immediately to museum (now in Aalborg Museum). The king took such pleasure in this work that he ordered a similar group: "Venus, Adonis and Cupid" (now in the marble garden, Fredensborg). Of Stanley other statues could include a Ceres and Diana (1757) in Fredensborg Marble Garden and Park as well as a flora for Rosenborg Garden. In addition, he performed a "Ganymede with the eagle" on what work he parade in 1752 as a member of the old Art Academy, since this 2 years later reorganiseredes, he became one of its professors. No major sculptor company he seems to have unfolded here at home. He has done a couple of monuments and must surely have produced more than statues of the above, but mostly he seems in his capacity hofbilledhugger (1755) that have been used to such things such as carrying out painting frames and model decorations at the royal trucks and at Academy of large gilded armchair. In his final years – from about 1753 – he was also linked to the oldest Danish porcelain factory at the Blue Tower. He delivered his owner, JG Mehlhorn, different models, and when Louis Fournier, who had made his first attempt at Stanley's house on Christianshavn in 1760 took over the factory, he had oversight of its activities. Took a long time he did not this position when he died 17 February 1761.

While Stanley, judging by his few surviving works by the artist does not reach beyond the mediocre, he must, in consequence his novel portrays Büsching, deserve the best credentials as a human being. He has not only been a man with an amiable and courteous creature, which won him his contemporaries' "respect and love", but in a rare degree been endowed with talents. He was very musical, singing and playing beautifully. Moreover, he wrote poems, and after his return and his death, he employed himself in translating English religious writings, including by Fielding and Doddrige, Translations, who lauded for their beautiful Danish language. His portrait, painted by Eccard belong to the Academy.

== Monuments ==
- Monument to Thomas Maynard at Hoxne (1742) over 5m tall depicting Maynard in a Roman toga
- Monument to the Maynard family at Little Easton (1745)

== Family ==
He first (1730) married Anna Allen from Sussex who died in 1735. In 1737 he married Magdalene Margrethe Lindemann (a Dane) who died in 1763. His son by the second marriage, Carl Frederick Stanley (d.1813), was born in Westminster and was also a sculptor.
