= Carl Frederik Stanley =

English-Danish sculptor (d. 1813)

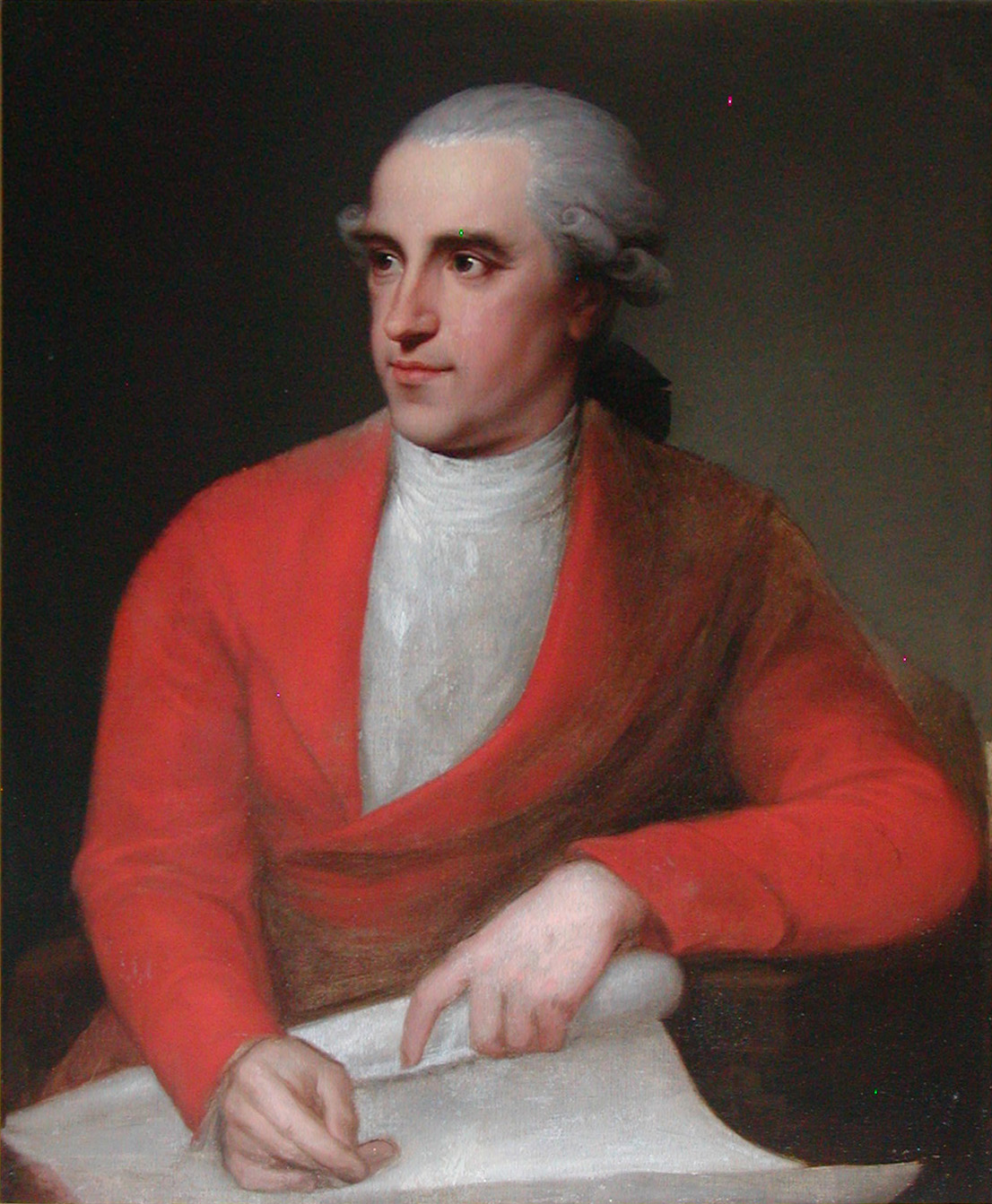
- Carl Frederik Stanley painted by Erik Pauelsen in 1785. Frederiksborg Museum
- Born: C. 1738; Westminster, London, UK
- Died: 9 March 1813; Copenhagen, Denmark
- Known for: Sculptor
- Movement: Neo-Classicism

Carl Frederik Stanley (c. 1738 – 9 March 1813) was an English-Danish sculptor, a leading proponent of early Neo-Classicism in Denmark.

== Early life and education ==
Carl Frederik Stanley was born the son of Simon Carl Stanley, a sculptor of English descent who had been born in Denmark but moved to England. In 1746 the family returned to Denmark. After first training with his father, Carl Frederik Stanley became one of the first students to enter the new Royal Danish Academy of Fine Arts in 1755. That same year he won his first award and in 1758 he won the Academy's large gold medal for the sculpture Noah's Sacrifice.

The gold medal was accompanied by a six-year travel scholarship and the following year he went abroad to further his education. He first settled in Paris, where he studied under the sculptor Guillaume Coustou. In 1762 he moved to Rome, where he studied and made copies of Classical sculptures, before returning to Denmark in 1766.

== Career ==
Back in Denmark in 1768, Stanley was commissioned to design the marble funerary monument to Queen Louise in Roskilde Cathedral. He exhibited sketches for the monument at the Academy's first exhibition in 1769 but it was not completed until 1791.

During the 1770s and 1780s he executed various other monuments, such as that to the shipbuilder Peter Applebye (c. 1774), Christian's Church). He also contributed to the decorations at the Court Theatre and of the Knight's Hall at Christiansborg Palace.

In 1776 he was unanimously accepted as a member of the Royal Art Academy and the following year he received Danish citizenship and was appointed a professor there.

From 1784 to 1785 he worked on a series of allegorical and historical reliefs for the plinth of the Trade and Navigation Monument at Lyngby. He produced few works after the early 1790s.

== Works ==
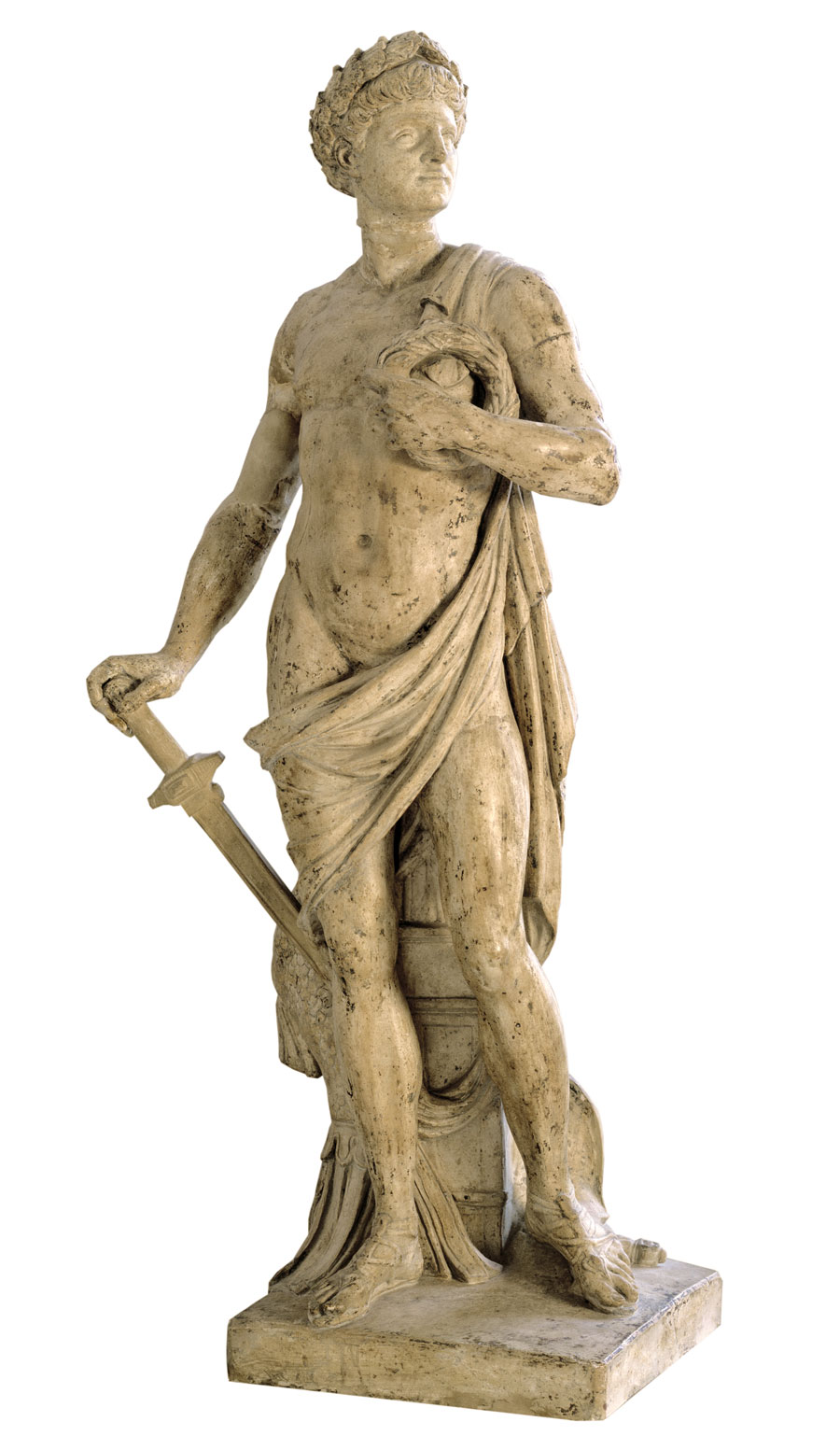
Stanley's Amor patriae from 1777, Danish National Gallery

Stanley's most significant work remained his funerary monument to Queen Louise. It is located in Frederick V's Chapel and designed in a severe, Neo-classical style.

His admittance piece for the Royal Art Academy was the allegorical Amor patriae of which several examples exist in various materials. Executed in an elegant Neo-classical style, the work shows a partly draped classical figure holding a sword in one hand and a wreath in the other. The statue represents a growing awareness of national identity and history in Denmark which was typical of the time. The previous year, King Christian VII had introduced nationality laws which meant that Government posts and other public offices would in general be reserved for Danish citizens.

Stanley also produced a number of portrait busts, including a posthumous plaster bust of Johannes Ewald (1784, Danish National Gallery).

== See also ==
- Danish sculpture
