= Krogerup =

Coordinates: 55°58′25″N 12°32′05″E

Krogerup Folk High School
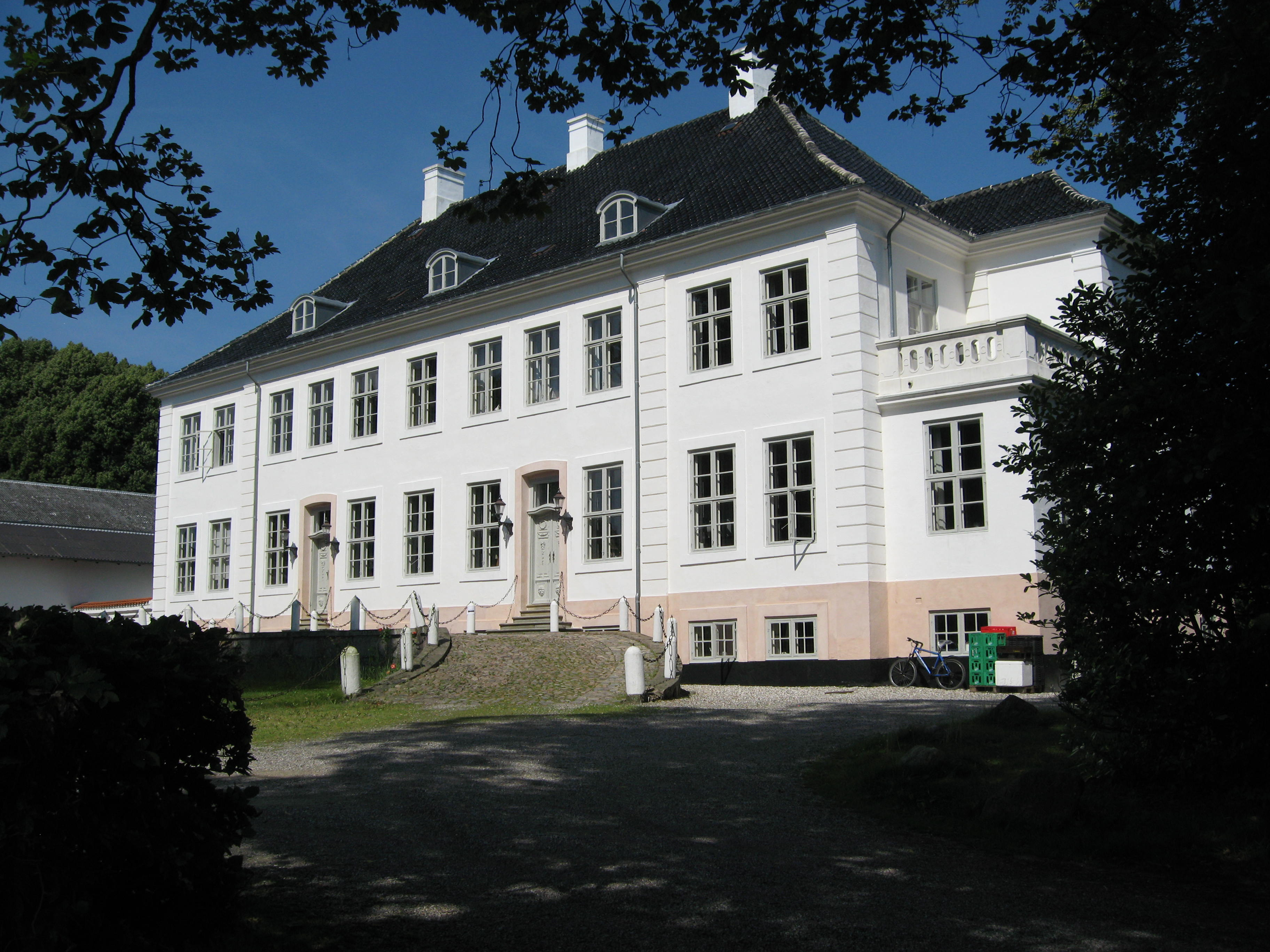
- Humlebæk, Denmark

Information
- Type: Folk high school
- Founded: 1946
- Founder: Hal Koch
- Headmaster: Rikke Forchhammer
- Enrollment: 450
- Website: http://www.krogerup.dk/

Krogerup Højskole (English: Krogerup Folk High School) is a folk high school located outside Humlebæk in Fredensborg-Humlebæk Municipality north of Copenhagen, Denmark. Founded in 1953, it is based in a former manor house built from 1772 to 1777.

== History ==
=== Krogerup Manor ===
The earliest certain reference to Krogerup is from 1577, although Krogerup may be identical to a "Krwwerup" mentioned in the records of Æbelholt Abbey in the beginning of the 16th century. In the mid-17th century, the estate belonged to Hans Rostgaard, a civil servant who was active in the combat against invading Swedish troops. His bibliognostic son Frederik Rostgaard withdrew to Krogerup when he was banished from the Royal Court in Copenhagen in 1724 after accusations of corruption. Later Krogerup was acquired by the noble family van der Maase and under their ownership the first known Krogerup building was constructed in 1776.

Constantin Brun, a successful merchant and royal administrator of trade in the Danish West Indies, bought the property in 1812 for his sons who were farmers and politicians . They added an extra floor to the main building and planted many rare trees. The Brun family owned Krogerup until 1939. By then the estate was deep in debt, and when the last Brun to own it died, none of the heirs wished to inherit the property.

=== State ownership and Nazi confiscation ===
The Danish state therefore took over Krogerup and during World War II it was, for a while, used as a police academy by the Danish police force. When the Nazi occupants took control of the Danish police force in 1944, the HIPO Corps took over and ravaged the building. Following the Liberation of Denmark, the building was left vacant for more than a year.

=== The folk high school ===
In November 1946, Krogerup Folk High School was established by Hal Koch and five teachers and the first group of 30 students stayed in temporary barracks and helped with finishing the school.

Hal Koch's school was met with scepticism by the Danish folk high school movement and other national romantic Grundtvigian circles. It dealt with such academic elements as European humanism, human rights, democracy and politics that were unfamiliar elements for the folk high school movement which, since its establishment in 1834, had focused on Danish and Nordic history and national identity as manifested in the countryside.

The original main building of the manor house has been listed but new buildings have been added in 1958, 1970, 1988 and 1999.
