= Johanne Pedersen-Dan =

Danish sculptor

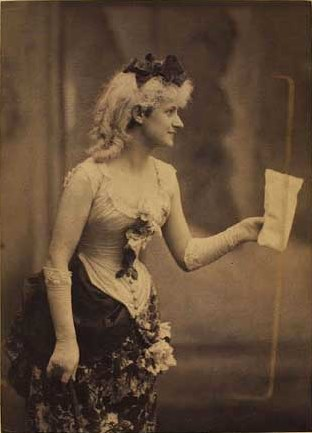
- Photograph from the 1880s. Det Kgl. Bibliotek
- Born: 13 May 1860; Copenhagen
- Died: 21 May 1934 (aged 74); Hvidovre
- Resting place: Hvidovre Cemetery
- Occupation: Sculptor
- Spouse(s): Hans Peder Pedersen-Dan
- Parent(s): Georg Emil Betzonich
- Awards: De Neuhausenske Præmier (1903)

Johanne Agnete Theresia Pedersen-Dan née Betzonich (1860–1934) was a Danish actress, singer and sculptor. After performing in plays and operettas in Copenhagen until 1888, she devoted the rest of her life to sculpture, frequently exhibiting her work at Charlottenborg. Johanne Pedersen-Dan and her husband Hans Peder Pedersen-Dan lived and worked in Hvidovre Rytterskole in Hvidovre from 1912 to 1936.

== Early life ==
Born in Copenhagen on 13 May 1860, Johanne Agnete Theresia Betzonich was the daughter of the writer Georg Betzonich (1829–1901) and Christiansine Nicoline Møller (1833–1923). In 1882,

== Acting career ==
Pedersen-Dan embarked on her career as an actress, encouraged by her cousin, the successful actress Elga Sinding. She débuted in 1876 at Folketeatret, as the baroness in P. Rawsky's Familien Danielsen. She went on to perform in plays and operettas, including Offenbach's La Vie parisienne. She also performed at the Casino Theatre and at the Dagmar Theatre.

== Sculpture ==
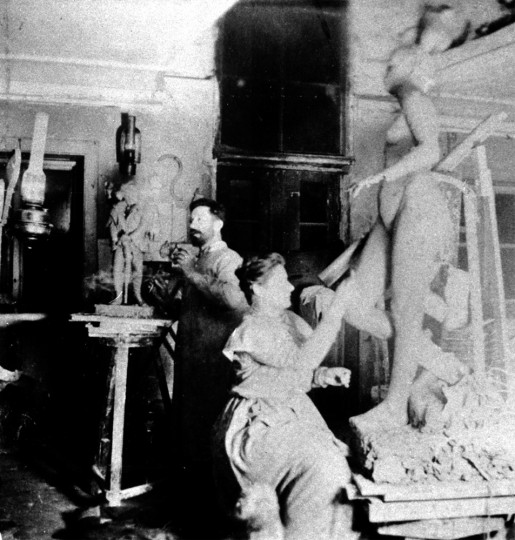
Johanne Pedersen-Dan and her husband in their studio

She began to study sculpture with Stephan Sinding, her cousin's husband, and debuted at the Charlottenborg Spring Exhibition in 1890 with the glister sculpture of a female snake charmer. She married the sculptor Hans Peder Pedersen-Dan in 1892.

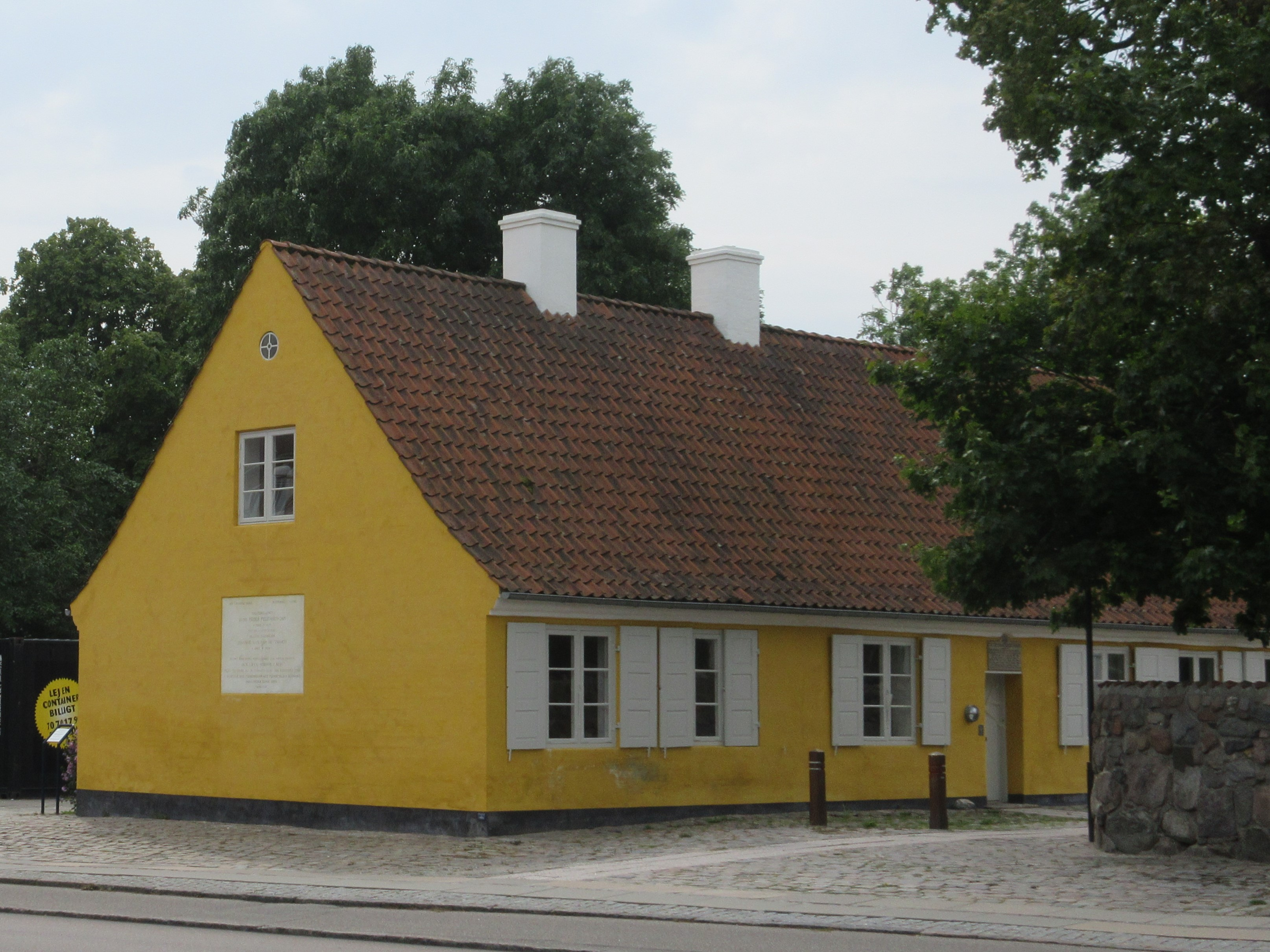
Hvidovre Rytterskole where Pedersen-Dan lived from 1912

She was represented on the 1895 Copenhagen Women's Exhibition as well as on exhibitions in Munich in 1892, 1909 and 1913 and at the World's Columbian Exposition in Chicago in 1893. She received the Neuhausen Prize in 1903 for the statuette Little Mother. In 1906 she won an international competition for an emblem advocating women's right to vote. The emblem was released in both Europe and the United States.

Pedersen-Dan and her husband went on several story trips abroad, especially to Paris and Italy but also to North Africa in 1904. The couple lived and worked in the former cavalry school in Hvidovre from 1912 to 1936. She was a board member of the Danish Sculptors Society.

== Personal life and legacy ==
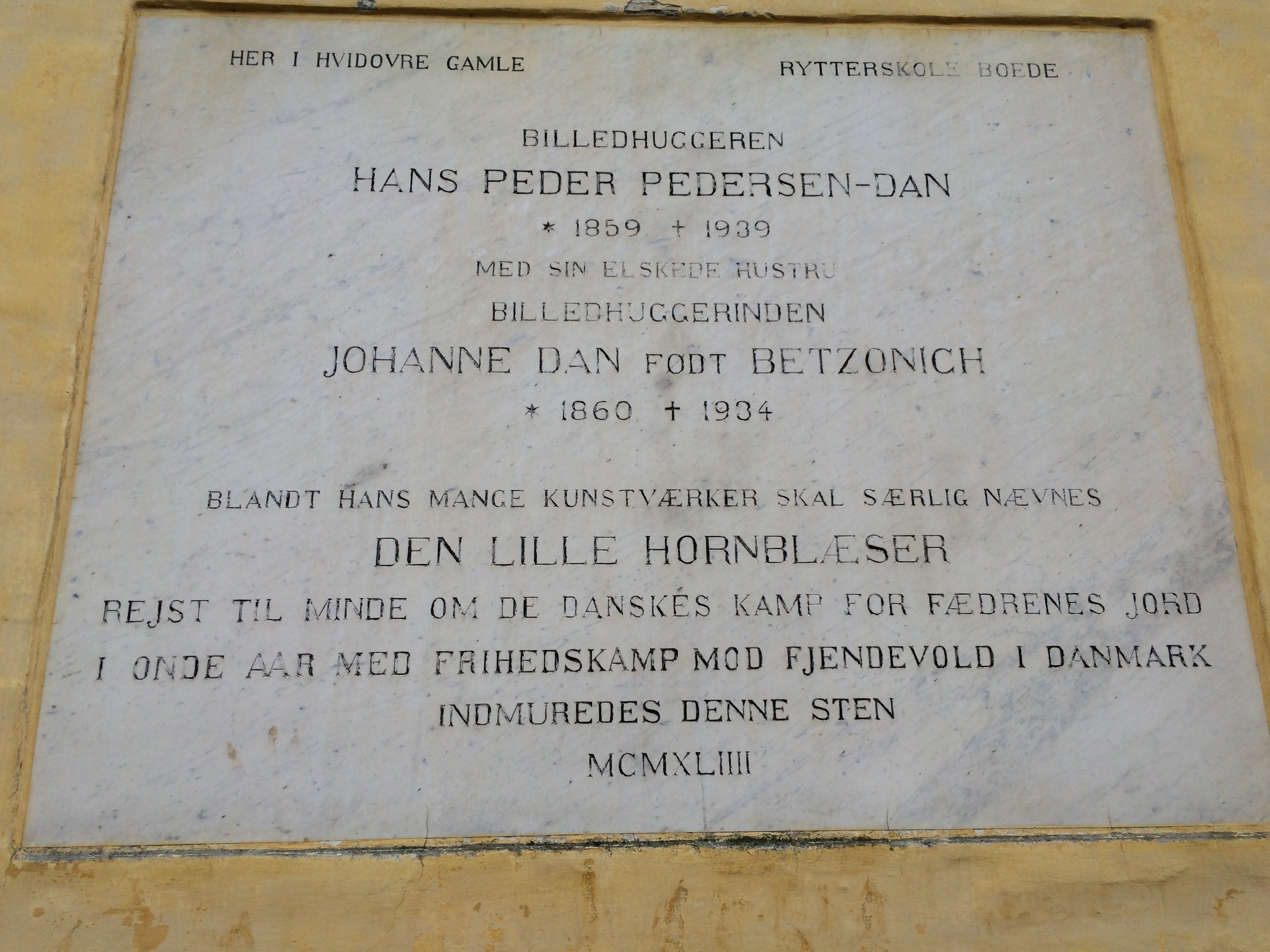
Memorial plaque

Johanne and Hans Peder Pedersen-Dan adopted a girl, Rigmor.Johanne Pedersen-Dan died on 21 May 1934. She is buried at Hvidovre Cemetery. A plaque on one of the gables of Hvidovre Rytterskole commemorates that Johanne Pedersen-Dan and her husband lived and worked in the building from 1912 to 1936.

== List of works ==
- Snake charmer (plaster, 1890)
- By the Stream (plaster, 1891)
- A Forest Nymph (plaster, 1892)
- After the Storm (plaster, 1894)
- Woman Sleepwalker (1902)
- Little Mother (1903)
- Santa (plaster, 1905)
- Forest Idyll (bronze, 1898)
- On the Slave Market (1006)
