= 1712 in Denmark =

- Decades: 1690s; 1700s; 1710s; 1720s; 1730s
- See also: Other events of 1712; List of years in Denmark

Events from the year 1712 in Denmark.

== Incumbents ==
- Monarch – Frederick IV
- Grand Chancellor – Christian Christophersen Sehested

== Events ==
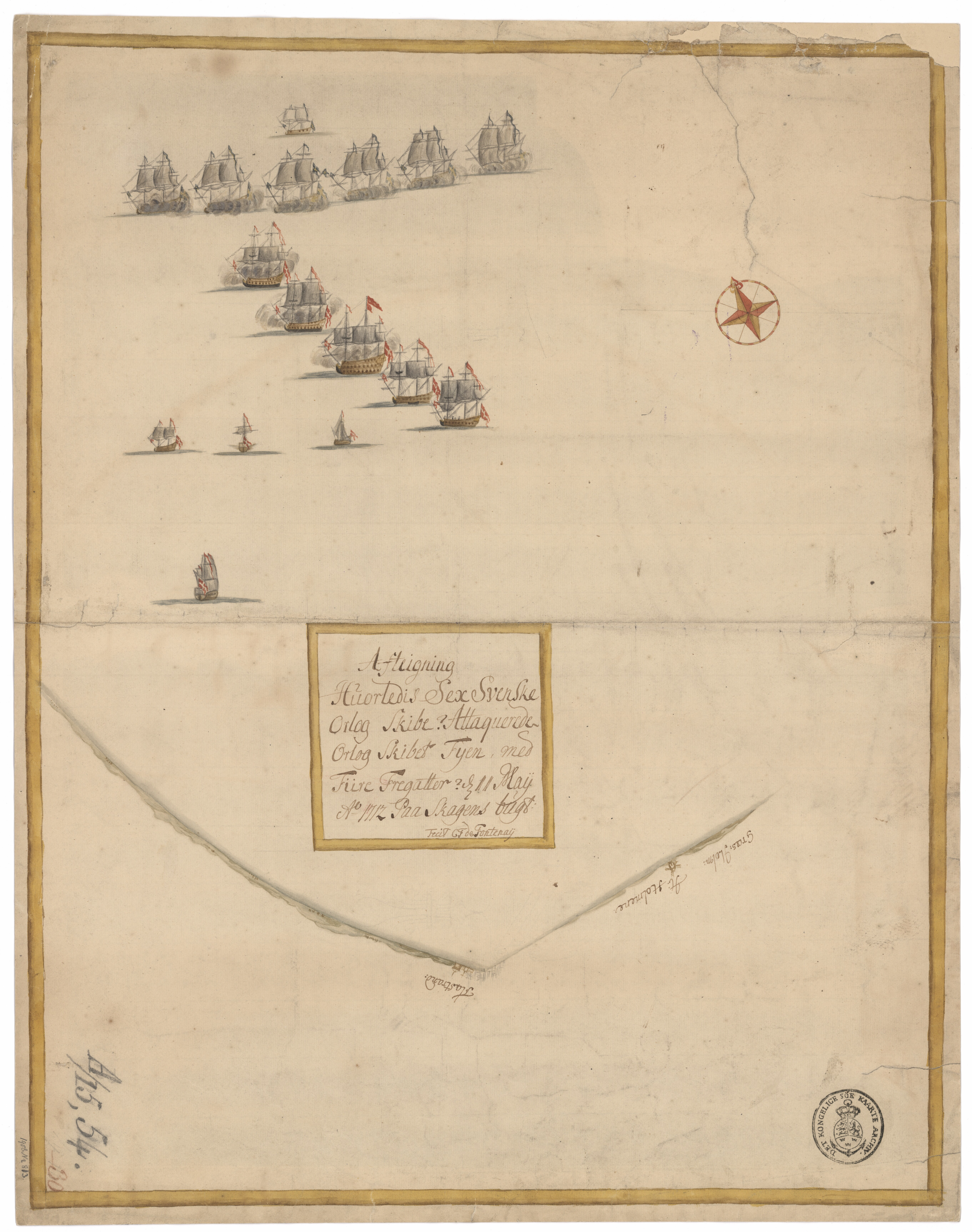
11 May: Fruen and four Danish frigates refuses an attack from six Swedish frigates north of Hirsholmene..

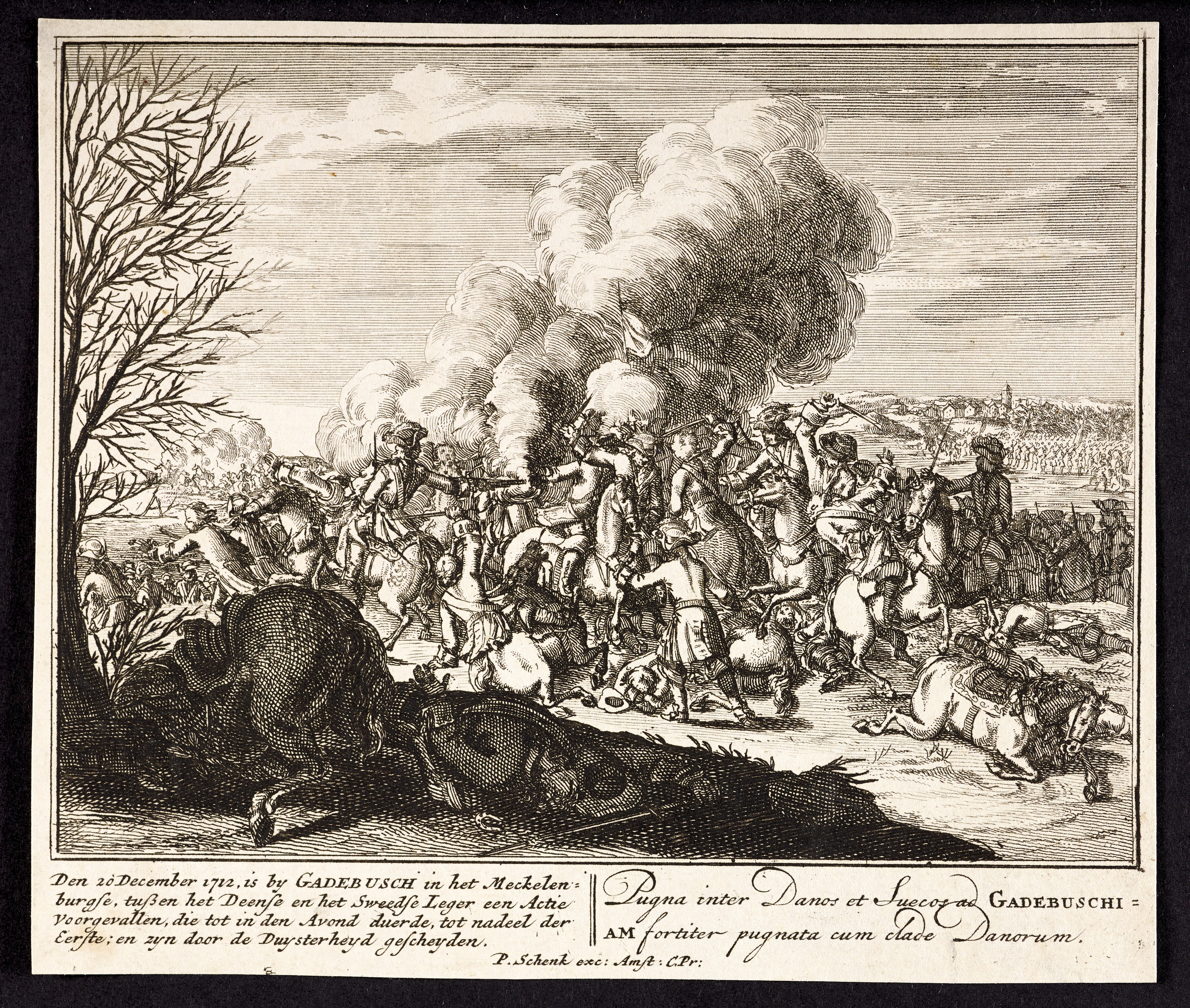
20 December: Battle of Gadebusch.

- 8 April – The Danish frigate Heyeren sinks in Præstø Ghord after being shot upon by the Swedish frigate Hvita Örn, captained by Johan Casper Printz.
- 11 April – Battle of Fladstrand, battle of the Great Northern War.
- 11 May – The Danish ship of the line Fuen and four Danish frigates refuses an attack from six Swedish frigates north of Hirsholmene.
- 1 July – The children of the theologian and landowner Hector Gottfried Masius are ennobled by letters patent with the name von der Maase.
- 20 December – The Battle of Gadebusch.

== Births ==
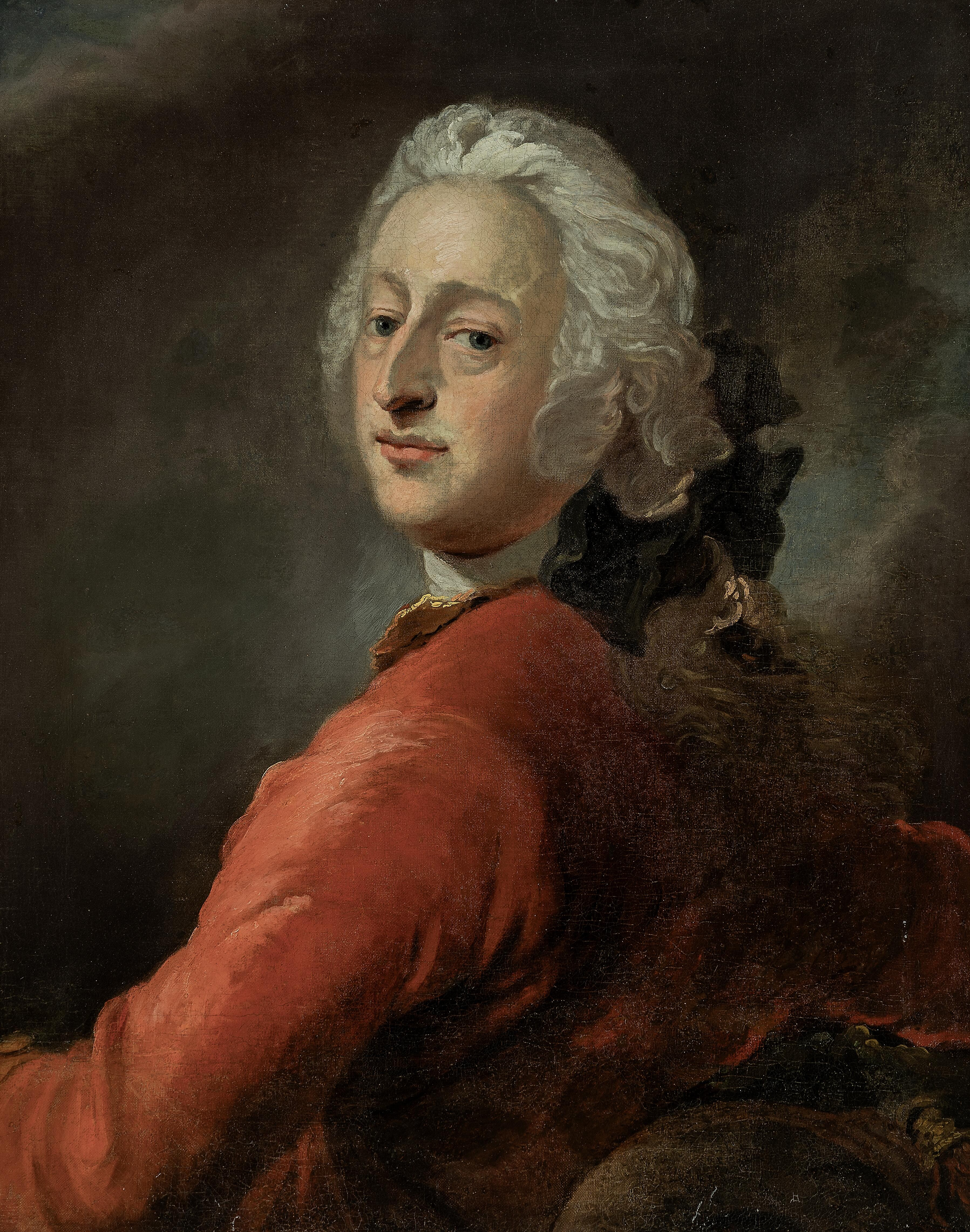
Simon Hooglant.

- 8 June – Simon Hooglant, admiral (died 1789)
- 1 July – Frederik Oertz, county governor and court official (died 1779)
- 7 October – Christian Fædder, chief of police (died 1793)

=== Full date missing ===
- Johan Peter Suhr, businessman (died 1785)

== Deaths ==
- 11 September – Christian Vind, government official (born 1664)
