= Holmegård (manor house) =

Manor house and estate in Denmark

Holmegaard
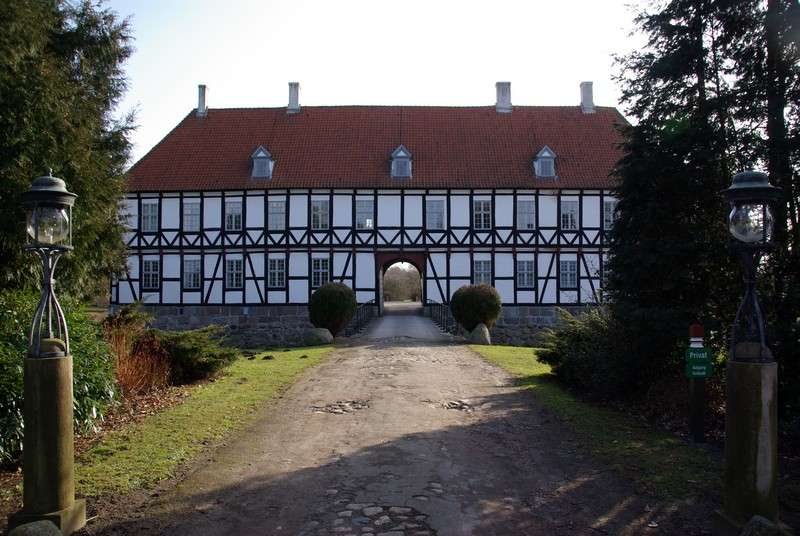

General information
- Location: Næstved Municipality, Holmegaard Hovedbygning 1, 4684 Holmegaard, Denmark
- Coordinates: 55°16′28.3″N 11°50′14.7″E
- Completed: 1635

Design and construction
- Main contractor: Georg Jacobsen

Holmegaard is a manor house and estate situated close to Fensmark, Næstved Municipality, some 60 km south of Copenhagen, Denmark. The three-winged, half-timbered main building was constructed for Claus Olufsen Daa in 1635. The estate was acquired by Christian Conrad Danneskiold-Samsøe in 1801 and has remained in the hands of his descendants since then. Holmegaard Glass Factory was established by his widow Henriette Danneskiold-Samsøe in 1825. The main building was listed in the Danish registry of protected buildings and places in 1918. The estate covers 1,724 hectares of land (including Juellinge and Tryggevælde).

== History ==
=== Early history ===
In the Middle Ages, Holmegaard was simply known as Holme. The first known owner of the estate was Tyge Mortensen Ravensberg. In 1402–1438, Holmegaard belonged to squire Anders Pedersen Griis til Nordrup. estate remained in the possession of members of the Griis family until the middle of the 16th century.

=== Daa family ===
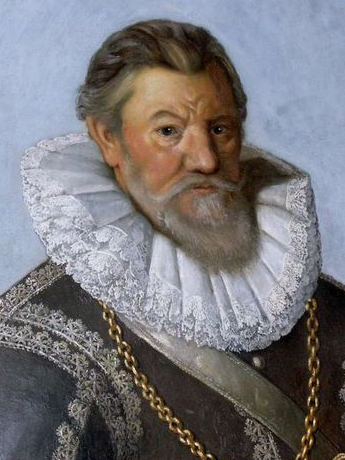
Claus Oludsen Daa

On the death of Hans Joachimsen Griis, ownership of Holmegaard was divided into two stakes. One of the stakes was for several generations owned by members of the Daa family, while the other one frequently changed hands between different families. On Oluf Daa's death, his share of the estate passed to his son Claus Olufsen Daa. In 1625, he also managed to acquire the other stake in the Holmegaard estate. In 1635, he constructed a new three-winged main building. He was a major landowner. His other holdings included Borreby and Ravnstrup on Zealand, Fravgdegaard on Funen and Bonderup in Jutland. In 1631, he was appointed as Admiral of the Realm.

On Claus Olufsen Daa's death, Holmegaard passed to his son Oluf Clausen Daa. He sold some of the land and later had to leave the country due to his close ties to Corfitz Ulfeldt. On his return to Denmark, Frederick III forced him to part with Holmegaard in exchange for the much less valuable estate Hevringholm. Broksø and 10 other farms were subsequently placed under Holmegaard.

=== Krabbe Trolle and Post ===
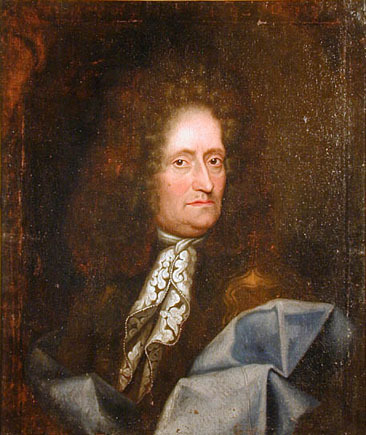
Otto Krabbe

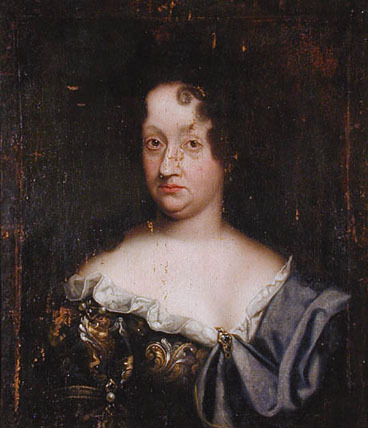
Birgitte Krabbe, née Skeel

On his death bed, Frederick III granted Holmegaard and Broksø to his page (kammerjunker) Otto Krabbe. In 1671, he was promoted to chamberlain by the new king (Christian V). Later in the same year, he was appointed as prefect (amtmand) of Tryggevælde, Vordingborg and Møn. In 1675, Holmegaard and Broksø were both granted the status of manors. This status came with a number of privileges, including freedom from taxes. Krabbe reacquired much of the land that had been sold by Oluf Claussen Daa. In 1681, he also acquired nearby Bækkeskov. With the death of his father-in-law Otto Skeel in 1695. he also became the owner of Egholm and Krabbesholm. Krabbe died in 1719 and was buried in Roskilde Cathedral. His widow Birgitte (née Skeel) managed the four estates for the next 19 years. Since none of their three children had survived to adulthood, Birgitte Skeel chose to bequeath Holmegaard and Broksø to Birgitte Restorff, a daughter of one of her late husband's nieces, who was married to Knud Trolle. Birgitte Restorff, who outlived her husband by 30 years, stayed on the estates until her death in 1790. Having no children, she bequeathed her estates to her niece, Margrethe Elisabeth Restorff, who was married to Peder Lasson von Post.

=== Danneskiold-Samsøe family ===
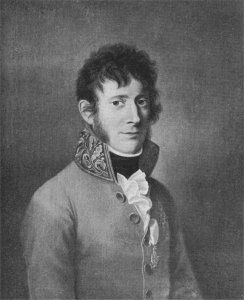
Christian Conrad Sophus Danneskiold-Samsøe

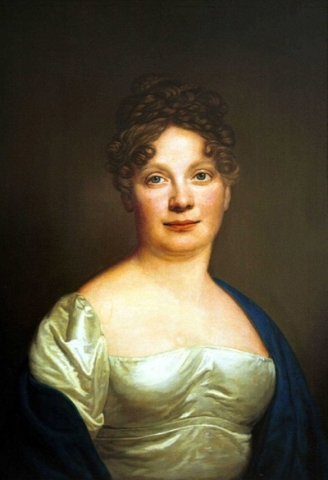
Henriette Valentine Danneskiold-Samsøe

In 1801,Christian Conrad, Count of Danneskiold-Samsøe purchased Holmegaard and Broksø. In 1792, when he was still a minor, Danneskiold-Samsøe had joined the Council of Samsøe County and the board of Gisselfeld Abbey. He also bought a number of other estates, including Næsbyholm (1804), Ravnstrup (1805), Bavelse, Aalebæksgaard and Rosendal (1806) and Nordfeld (1820). In 1808 he became prefect of Præstø County; he retained this position until his death. He initiated various public works, such as a port at Karrebaeksminde and a hospital in Naestved. He lived with his wife Henriette Danneskiold-Samsøe and their six children at Gisselfeld.

He both sold some of the land that had belonged to Holmegaard, but also added new land. In the 1820s, he planned to create a glass factory there as he realized the local peat could be used as fuel. He requested permission from the king to go ahead with his plans in 1823 but died before receiving an answer. His widow persisted, receiving permission from the king to build the factory. Despite having to care for her six children alone, she was able to open the Holmegaard Glasværk in 1825, originally producing green glass bottles but soon moving into fine crystal glass. In 1836, she also established a brickyard on the estate. In 1941, she constructed the farm Petersminde on some of the land.

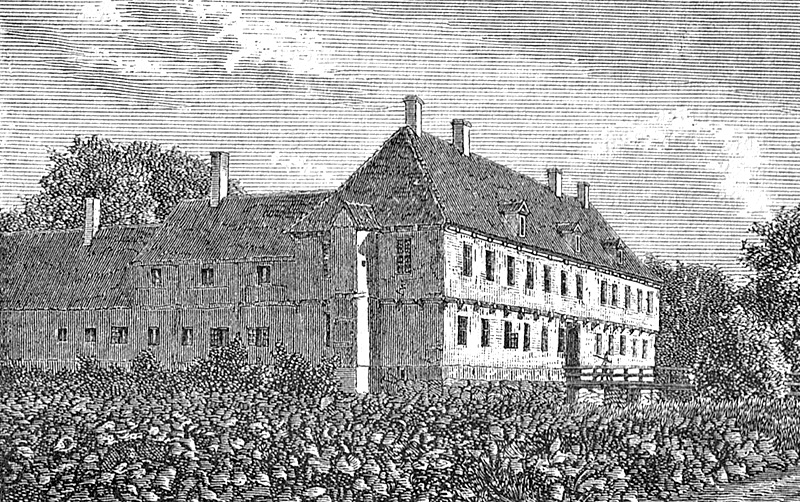
Holmegaard in 1872.

Henriette Danneskiold-Samsøe died in Copenhagen on 28 July 1843. Holmegaard manor and glass factory were passed to her second eldest son Christian Conrad Sophus Danneskiold-Samsøe (1800–1886). In 1833, he had married Lady Elisabeth Brudenell-Bruce. In 1850, he married secondly to Anna Lovise Amalie von Zytphe. He expanded Holmegaard Glass Factory and managed it with great skill. In 1860, he succeeded his brother as holder of the County of Samsø. He also constructed the country house Enrum at Vedbæk.

On Christian Conrad Sophus Danneskiold-Samsøe's death in 1886, Holmegaard was passed to his son Ernst. He died without children on 10 January 1908. Holmegaard, Holmegaard Glass Factory and Enrum were therefore passed to his nephew Aage Conrad Danneskiold-Samsøe. He was married to Fanny baroness Lotzbeck, daughter of vice admiral A.F.M. Evers. Their only child was the daughter Elisabeth Henriette Aagesdatter Danneskiold-Samsøe. On her father's death, she became the owner of Brattingsborg and Holmegaard. On 24 June 1954, she married Frants Aksel Lassen. On her death, Holmegaard passed to their younger son Christian Ivar Danneskiold Lassen. They had three children, two sons and a daughter. On her death, Holmegaard went to their younger son Christian Ivar Danneskiold Lassen.

== Architecture ==
Golmegaard's half-timbered main building stands on an almost quadratic castle bak surrounded by moats. It consists of a 26-bays long, two-storey main wing in the west and two slightly lower side wings in the south and north. The hipped roof is clad in red tile. It is pierced by a number of tall, white-plastered chimneys. The gate in the main wing features the coat of arms of the Daa family and the inscription "Her Claus Daa til Rafnstrop med sin kære frue Ingeborg Parsberg lod dette hus opsætte, der man skrev efter guds byrd anno 1635". The two side wings were originally single-storey, free-standing buildings. The south wing was heightened and attached to the main wing in the late 17th century. A stone tablet with the year "1675" and the coat of arms and initials of Otto Krabbe and his first wife Dorthe Gersdorf seems to date this extension to that year. The north wing is 21 bays long of which the first nine-bays-long section is two storeys tall and the remaining 12 bays are single-storey. The single-storey section was originally used as a smithy but has now been converted into a garage. The south wing was formerly also 21 bays long, but its eastern part collapsed in the late 18th century and was never reconstructed.

== Today ==
Holmegaard is currently owned by Christian Ivar Schou Danneskiold Lassen. He is also the owner of the estates Juellinge and Tryggevælde. The three estates cover a combined area of 1,724 hectares of land.

== List of owners ==
- (1387) Tyge Mortensen Ravensberg
- (1402) Anders Pedersen Griis
- ( - ) Peder Andersen Griis
- ( - ) Joachim Pedersen Griis
- ( - ) Hans Joachimsen Griis
- Stake I
  - (1535) Anna Nielsdatter Lange, gift Griis
  - ( - ) Gunde Lange
  - ( -1571) Frederik Gundesen Lange
  - (1571- ) Peder Oxe
  - ( - ) Eustachius von Thümen
  - ( -1625) Anne Hansdatter Baden, gift von Thümen
- Stake II
  - ( -1532)Oluf Daa
- (1532- ) Claus Olufsen Daa
- ( - ) Oluf Clausen Daa
- ( -1625) Claus Olufsen Daa
- (1625–1641) Claus Olufsen Daa
- (1641–1664) Oluf Clausen Daa
- (1664–1670) The Crown
- (1670–1719) Otto Krabbe
- (1719–1737) Birgitte Skeel, gift Krabbe
- (1737–1760) Knud Trolle
- (1760–1790) Birgitte Restorff, gift Trolle
- (1790–1801) Peter Lasson von Post
- (1801–1823) Christian Conrad Danneskiold-Samsøe
- (1823–1843) Henriette Danneskiold-Samsøe, née Kaas
- (1843–1886) Christian Conrad Sophus Danneskiold-Samsøe
- (1886–1908) Ernest Danneskiold-Samsøe
- (1908–1945) Aage Conrad Danneskiold-Samsøe
- (1945–1980) Elisabeth Henriette Aagesdatter Danneskiold-Samsøe, gift Lassen
- (1980- ) Christian Ivar Schou Danneskiold Lassen
