= Wittusen House =

Building in Næstved, Denmark

- Wittusens Gård
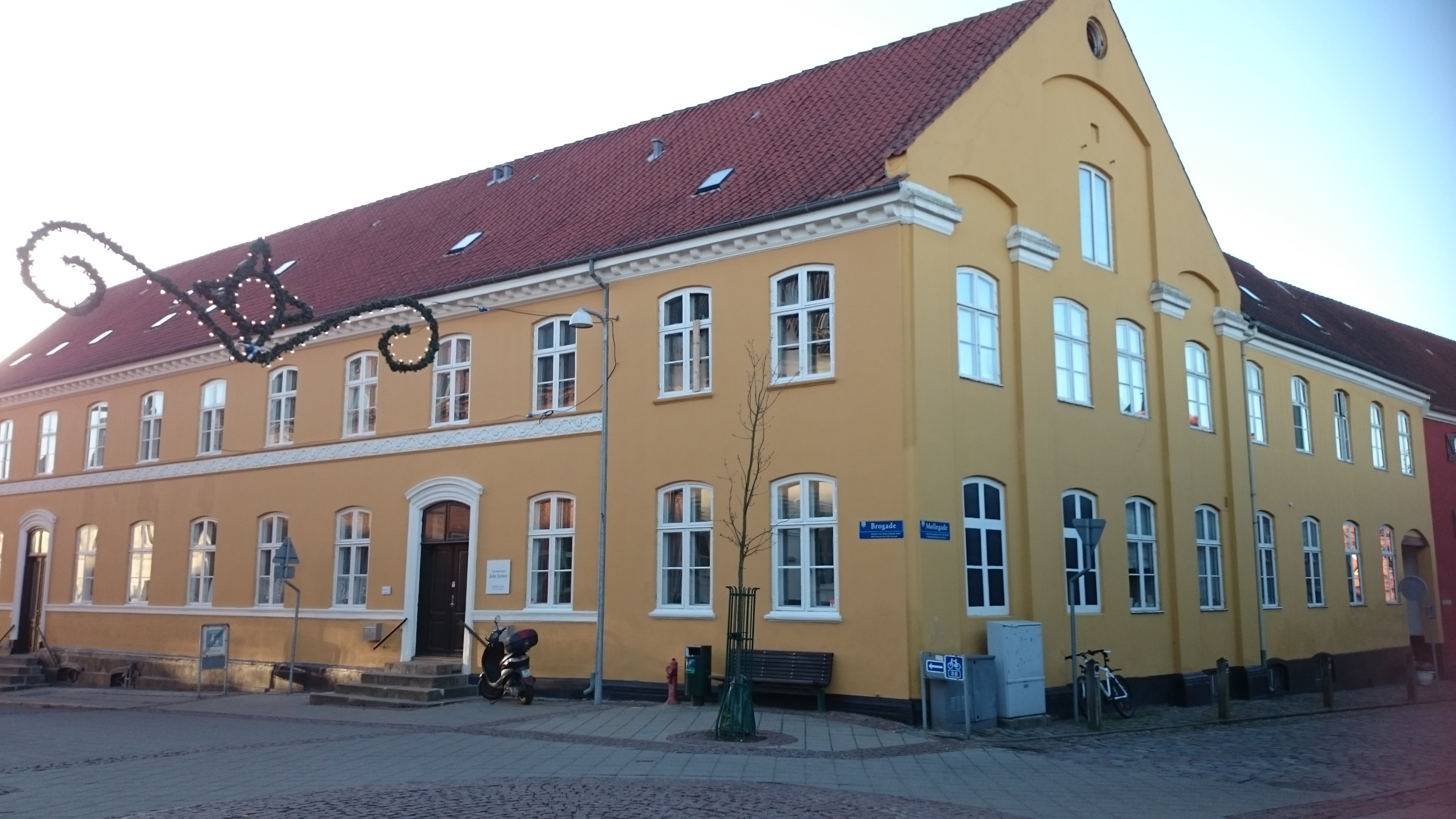
- Interactive map of the Wittusen House area

General information
- Location: Næstved, Brogade 2, 4700 Næstved, Denmark
- Coordinates: 55°13′51.42″N 11°45′17.96″E
- Completed: 1840s

The Wittusen House (Danish: Wittusens Gård) is a former merchant's house situated at the corner of Brogade and Møllegade in central Næstved, Denmark. The complex was constructed in 1842–1864 for Christian Martin Wittusen, a grain and timber merchant and Næstved's largest taxpayer in the years 1859–1871. It comprises a two-storey residential building in Brogade and a former warehouse in Møllegade as well as an actagonal grain kiln for drying the grain prior to storage. The three buildings were listed on the Danish registry of protected buildings and places in 1945.

== History ==
=== Christian Martin Wittusen ===
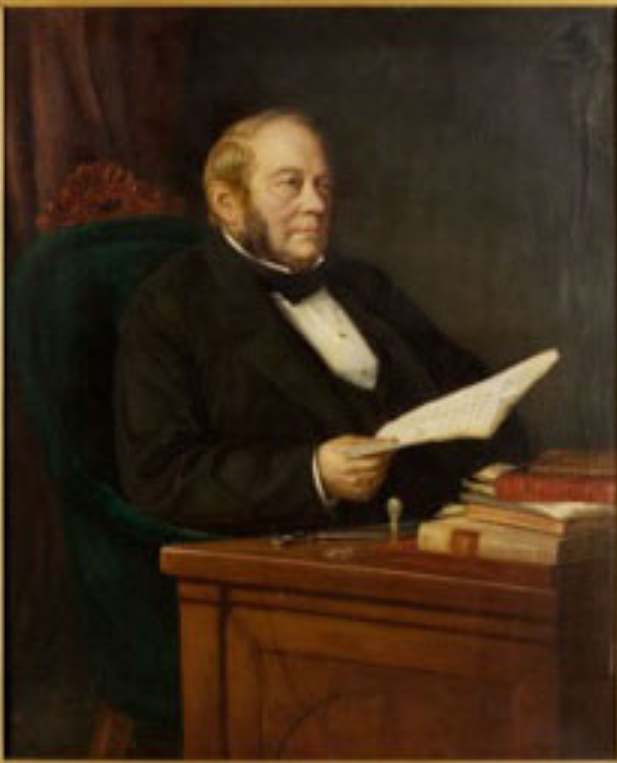
Christian Martin Wittusen.

Martin Wittusen (1804-1882) was born at Ravnstrup to Christian and Arntgott Margrethe Wittusen. His father leased the estate from the owner. Wittusen was apprenticed to a merchant in Oræstø. In January 1833, he was able to buy the property at the corner of Brogade and Møllegade in Næstved. He mainly traded in grain and timber. In 1840, he constructed a new warehouse at Karrebæksminde. In 1842, he expanded his house in Brogade with a new warehouse in Møllegade. In 1845, he also bought the building to the left of his house in Brogade. He subsequently replaced the two buildings with the present building on the site. The house in Brogade was constructed in 1849. It is possible that the building was designed by Georg Kretz. Kretz had participated in the planning of the new harbour development in Karrebæksminde in 1838. The grain kiln was not constructed until 1864. In 1851, in search of more space for his expanding business, he started renting Kompagnihuset. In 1843, he bought the building.

Wittusen's household consisted of 18 people in 1850. Himself, three daughters, two employees, an apprentice, three male caretakers, a housekeeper, five maids, a governess from Copenhagen and a husjomfru.

Wittusen 's trading house developed into the largest of its kind in Næstved. He was a member of the town council from 1846 to 51. In 1856, he succeeded Hatting as Swedish-Norwegian Vice-Consul. In 1859–1870, he was Næstved's largest tax payer. In around 1879, he was the owner of three schooners and a yacht.

Several of Wittusen's former employees would later start their own businesses and become prominent merchants in their own right. F. E. Sander started his own business on 27 May 1853 in Ringstedgade. H. V. Tolderlund established his own business on 18 October 1862 in Østergade. Carl E. Bergen partnered with Chr. S. Larsen in 1863.

=== 2nd generation, 1871–1893 ===
In 1863, Wittusen ceded part of his activities to his employee Carl E. Bergen. Berg's business was initially based in Witusen's building. In 1871, he moved the operations to new premises at Brogade 6. In 1871, Wittusen left the management of the firm in the hands of his nephew and his employee P.J. Abildgaard. Witusen remained the owner of the buildings until his death in 1882. They were then passed to his three daughters /two of them married).

=== Hans Olsen Birksted, 1873–1978 ===
On 1 May 1893, Wittusen's heirs rented the buildings out to Hans Olsen (from 1908: Hans Olsen Birksted). In 1890, 1890. he had established a grain and animal feed wholesale business in Bryggergården im Ringstedgade. In 1928, he converted his business into a limited company /aktieselskab) under the name Hans Olsen Birksted A/S. In 1928, it bought the buildings at the corner of Brogade and Møllegade from Wittusen's heirs. The firm specialized in timber and buildings materials. A large warehouse was constructed on the banks of Susåe.

=== Næstved Municipality, 1978–2000 ===
On 1 September 1976, Næstved Municipality acquired the buildings with effect from no later than September 1978. In January 1978, Birksted's timber business relocated to Holsted Nord. The buildings were subsequently refurbished. The first tenant was Bygningsinspektoratet(from October 1978). Birksted's large timber warehouse at Sisåen was demolished in 1982. In 1882–83, the buildings were again subject to restoration work under supervision of Flemming Mejneche. In 2000, Næstved' administration moved out of the buildings when a new office building was inaugurated. The buildings were subsequently sold,

== Gallery ==
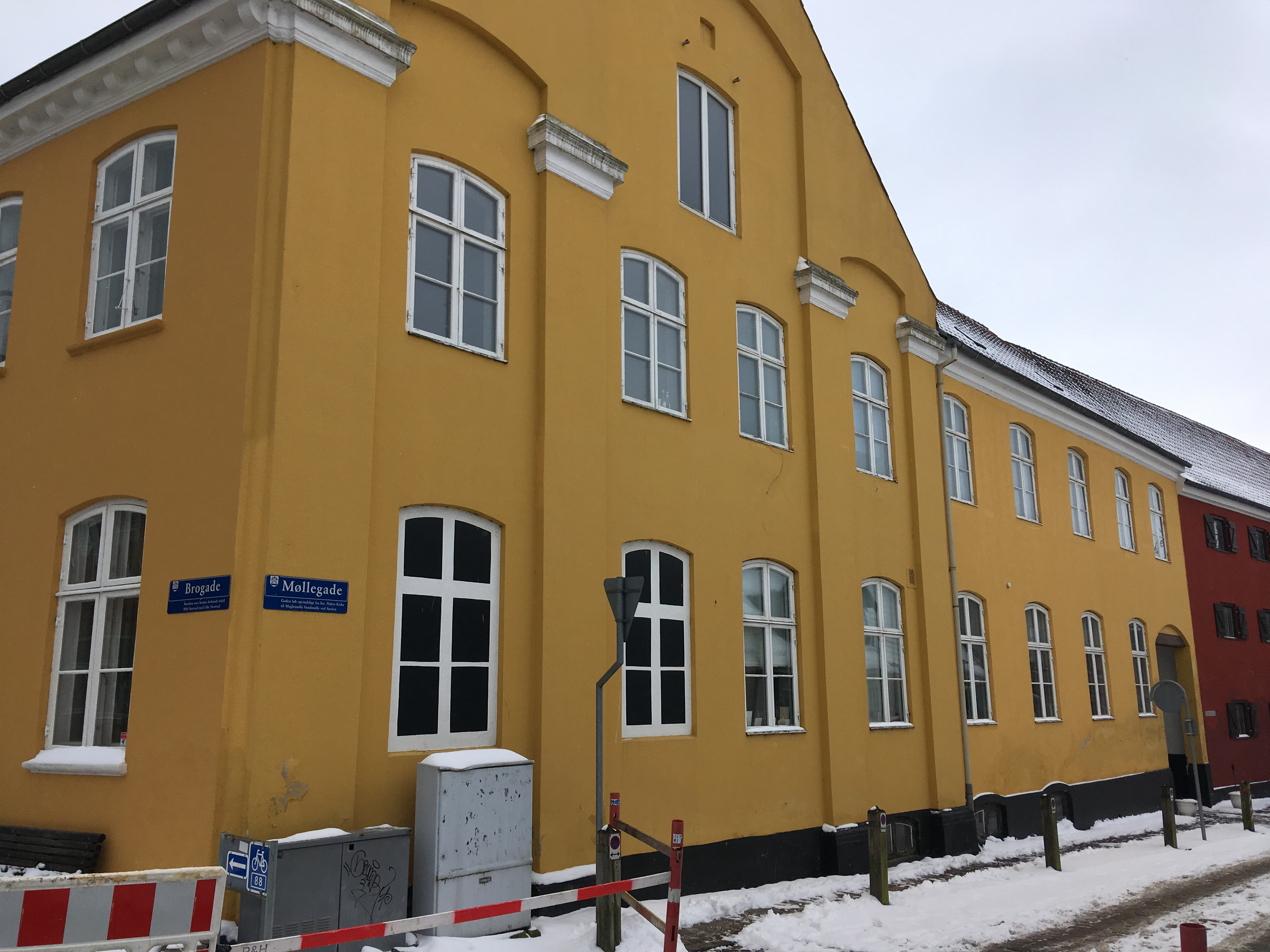
The side wing.

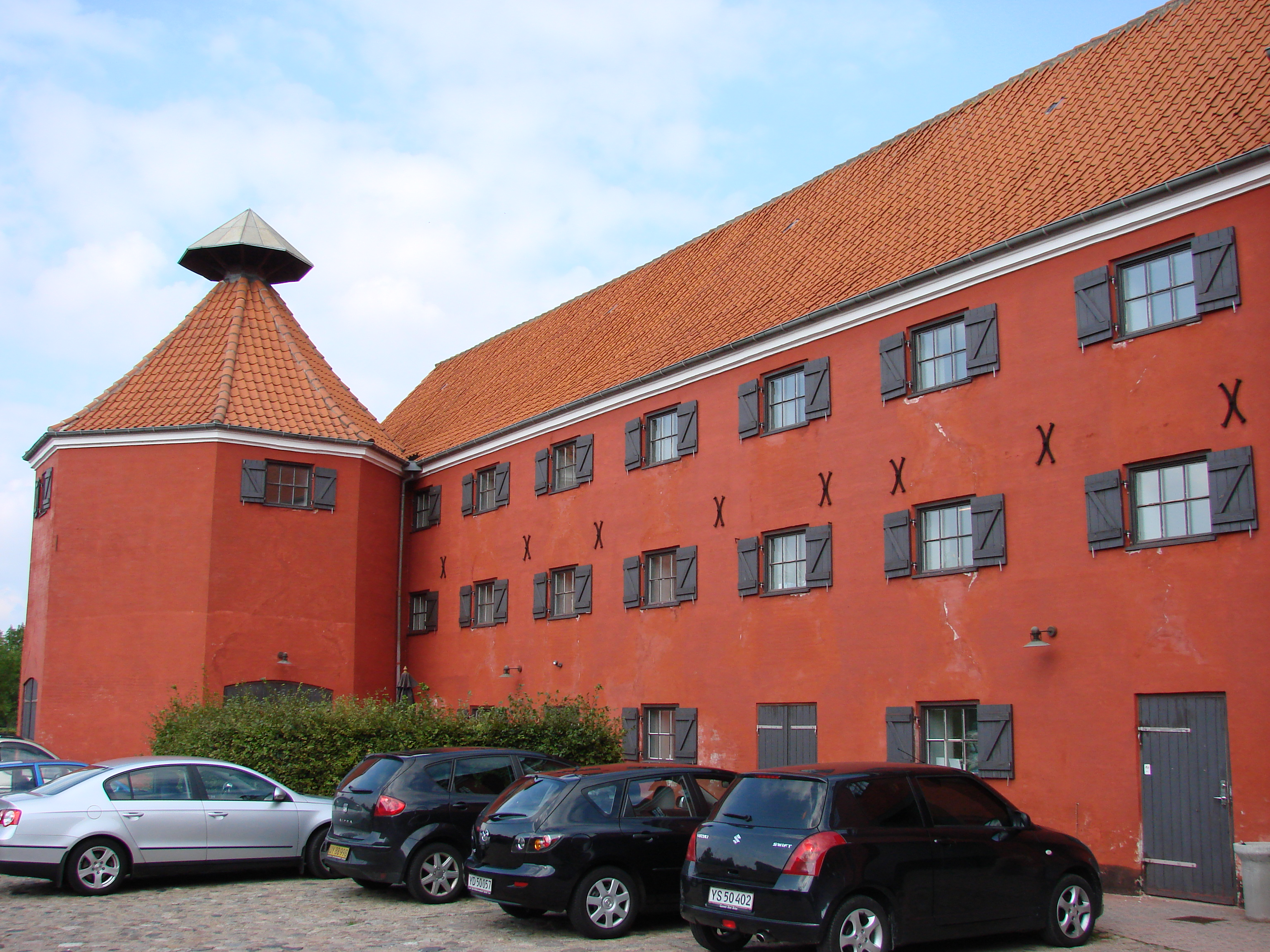
The warehouse and the grain oven.

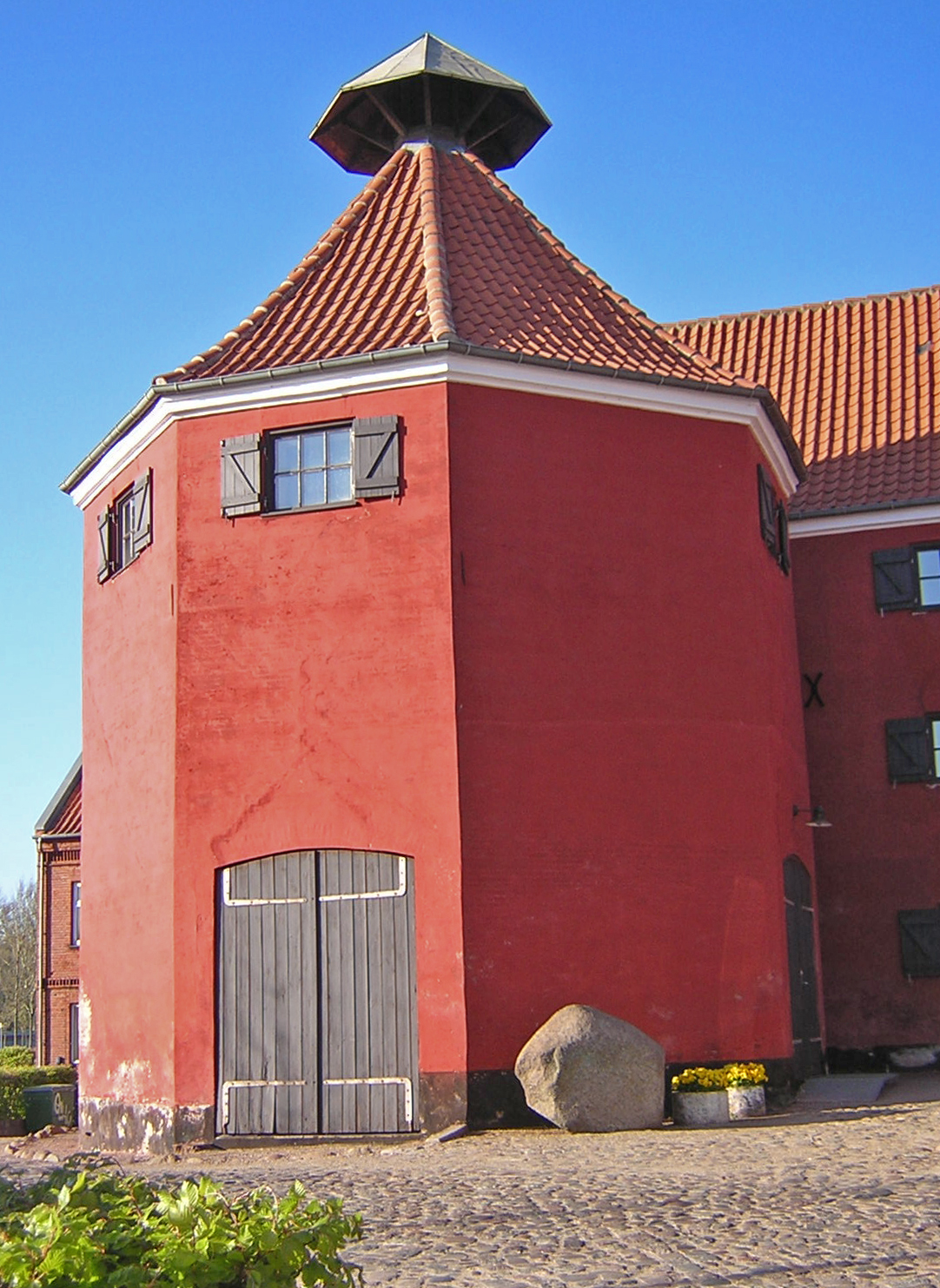
