= Georg Gruner =

Georg Grüner may refer to:

- Georg Grüner (landowner) (1817–1890), Danish landowner, politician and co-founder of Landmandsbanken
- Georg Grúner, German military officer
