= Gustav Bartholin Hagen =

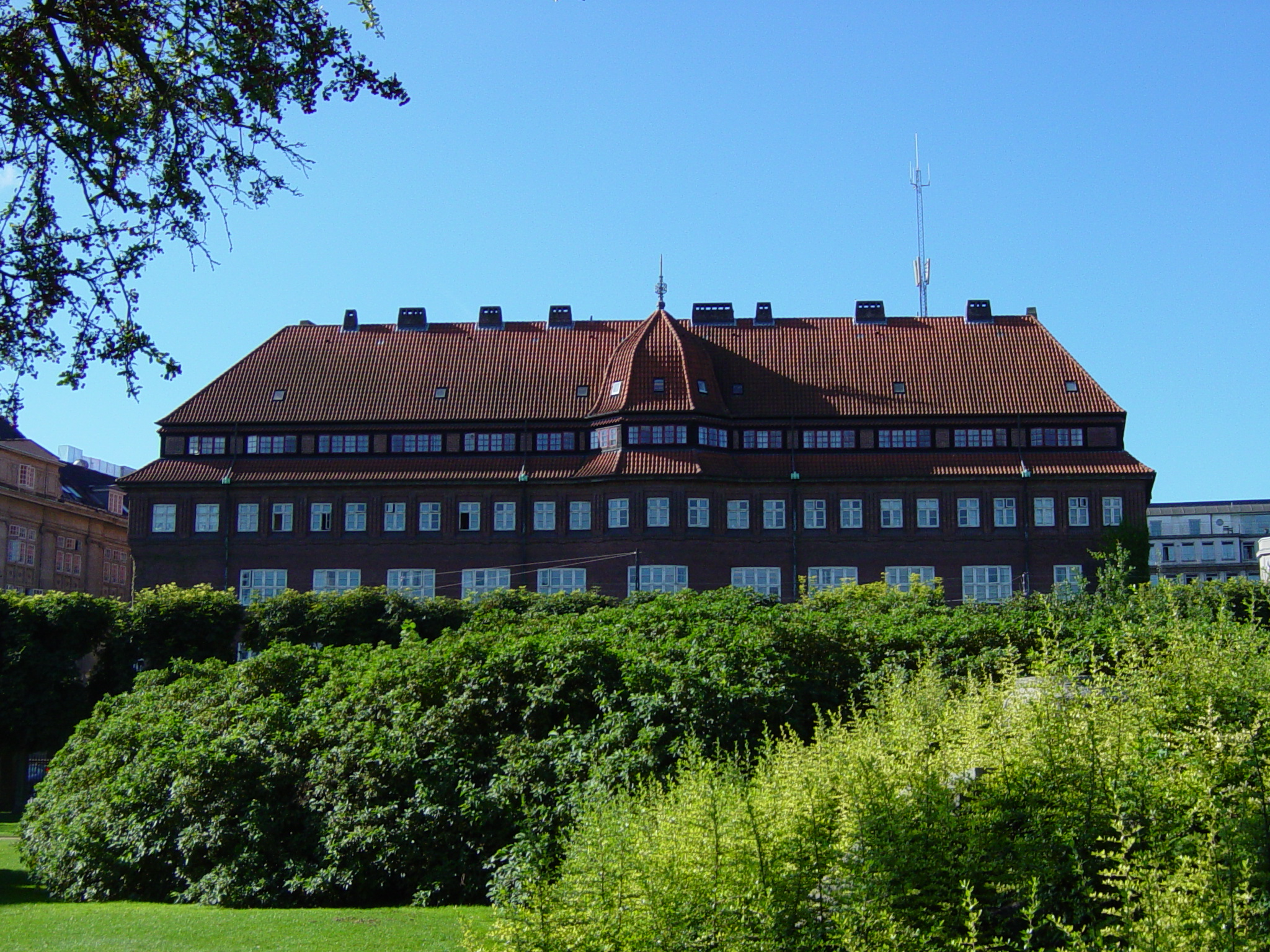
Københavns Belysningsvæsen, 1913

Gustav Bartholin Hagen (12 February 1873 – 10 May 1941) was a Danish architect. He was the father of the architect Ole Hagen (1913-1984).

== Early life and education ==
Gustav Bartholin Hagen was born in Copenhagen, the son of Sophus Hagen, a composer and music editor, and Serine Johanne Frederikke Klingsey. He completed a mason's apprenticeship in 1894 before attending a technical school to prepare for the Art Academy. In 1897 he was admitted to the Royal Danish Academy of Fine Arts where he studied under Hack Kampmann among others. After graduating in 1906, he received a travel scholarship and went to northern Italy the following year.

== Career ==
After his return to Denmark, Hagen established a successful practice, specializing in private villas and country houses, including B. Hertz' villa in Vedbæk (1904–08), Lystrupgård at Slangerup (1907) and Broksø at Næstved (1915–16). Another early work is the new headquarters of the Copenhagen Lighting Service (Københavns Belysningsvæsen) on Gothersgade in Copenhagen. He won the competition in 1909 and subsequently made the final design in collaboration with Rolf Schroeder who had taken 3rd prize.

Later in his career, he designed a number of schools, most notably Øregaard Gymnasium (1922–24, with Edvard Thomsen).

== Selected buildings ==
- Villa BH (for goldsmith Bernhard Hertz), Vedbæk Strandvej 322, Vedbæk (1904–08)
- Lystrupgård main building (1907)
- Villa, Østergade 18, Store Heddinge (1910)
- Københavns Belysningsvæsen, now VUC, 53 Gothersgade/8 Vognmagergade (1912–13, with Rolf Schroeder)
- Store Heddinge watertower, Store Heddinge (1912)
- Sparekassen for Køge og omegn, Køge (1913–14 and 1918–19)
- Warehouse, Enghave Brygge, Copenhagen (1918-1920)
- Sauntegård (1914)
- Broksø (1915–16)
- Olfert Fischer Monument, Reformed Church, Gothersgade, Copenhagen (1920)
- Halskovskolen, Korsør (competition in 1921)
- Øregård Gymnasium, Gersonsvej, Hellerup (1922–24, with Edvard Thomsen, listed)
- Sparekasse, Store Heddinge (1925, extended by the sculptor Mathilius Schack Elo, listed 2003)
- Gentofte Central Library, Øregårds Allé, Hellerup (1929–30, nedrevet)
- Skovshoved Skole extension, Skovshoved (1929–30, with Alfred Brandt)
- Dyssegårdsskolen, Dyssegårdsvej, Dyssegård (1929–33, with Alfred Brandt og Carl Schiøtz)
- Næsbyholm (1932–33)
- Søndermarksskolen, Frederiksberg (1932–33)
- Sønderjyllandsskolen, Frederiksberg (1939–43, with Ole Hagen)
- Damsøbadet, Frederiksberg (1941–43, with Ole Hagen)
