= Listed buildings in Næstved Municipality =

This is a list of listed buildings in Næstved Municipality, Denmark.

== The list ==
=== 4160 Herlufmagle ===
Listing name	Image	Location	Coordinates	Description
Gunderslevholm		Gunderslevvej 17, 4160 Herlufmagle	55°18′54.48″N 11°40′18.93″E	Main building from 1729 which was adapted in 1787.
Tybjerggaard		Tybjergvej 20, 4160 Herlufmagle	1763	Three-winged main building from 1763 with cellar from the Middle Ages under the East Wing.
Viborggård		Fensmarkvej 9, 4160 Herlufmagle	55°18′10.09″N 11°46′33.45″E	Main building from the 18th century

=== 4171 Glumsø ===
Listing name	Image	Location	Coordinates	Sescription
Glumsø Rectory		Storegade 24, 4171 Glumsø	1838	Residential wing from 1838.
Glumsø Rectory		Storegade 24, 4171 Glumsø		Three-winged complex of farm buildings-

=== 4250 Fuglebjerg ===
Listing name	Image	Location	Coordinates	Sescription
Førslevgaard		Førslevvej 54, 4250 Fuglebjerg	55°16′40.52″N 11°34′42.46″E	Three-winged main building from 1726
Tystrup Rectory		Bakkegårdsvej 2, 4250 Fuglebjerg	55°21′42.67″N 11°33′47.35″E	The half-timbered east wing from the first half of the 19th century

=== 4262 Sandved ===
Listing name	Image	Location	Coordinates	Sescription
Fuirendal		Fyrendalvej 14, 4262 Sandved	55°14′57.46″N 11°30′43.82″E	Main building from 1609
Fuirendal		Fyrendalvej 14A, 4262 Sandved	55°14′58.45″N 11°30′43.18″E	Gate wing from c. 1610

=== 4684 Holmegaard ===
Listing name	Image	Location	Coordinates	Sescription
Fensmark Rectory		Chr Winthersvej 2, 4684 Holmegaard		Residential wing from 1837 and a three-winged complex of farm buildings from c. 1775.
Fensmark Rectory		Chr Winthersvej 2, 4684 Holmegaard		
Fensmark Rectory		Chr Winthersvej 2, 4684 Holmegaard		
Holmegård		Holmegaard Hovedbygning 1, 4684 Holmegaard	55°16′28.37″N 11°50′14.72″E	Three-winged main building from 1635 with extension on the north side
Sparresholm		Sparresholmvej 4, 4684 Holmegaard	1798	Three-winged manor house from 1699.

=== 4700 Næstved ===
Listing name	Image	Location	Coordinates	D Description
Brogade 2: Wittusen House		Brogade 2A, 4700 Næstved	55°13′51.43″N 11°45′17.98″E	House on Brogade and warehouse wing on Møllegade
Brogade 2: Wittusen House		Møllegade 7A, 4700 Næstved	55°13′51.16″N 11°45′16.21″E	Detached warehouse
Næstved Cavalry Barracks		Grønnegade 10T, 4700 Næstved	1888	The New Riding Hall from 1888.
Næstved Cavalry Barracks		Grønnegade 10T, 4700 Næstved	1855	The old fencing hall from 1855-
Næstved Cavalry Barracks		Grønnegade 10D, 4700 Næstved	1855	Residential quarters from 1847.
Næstved Cavalry Barracks		Grønnegade 10, 4700 Næstved	1799	The Old Riding Hall from 1799 with exposed timber framing
Næstved Cavalry Barracks		Grønnegade 10, 4700 Næstved	1847	Stables from 1847
Dom- og arresthuset - det tidl. rådhus i Næstved		Hjultorv 2, 4700 Næstved	1856	Tinghuset: Former town hall from 1855-56 by Michael Gottlieb Bindesbøll, jailhouse with courtyards, wall on Hjultorv from 1855-56 by Gottlieb Bindesbøll) and the yard behind it.
Dom- og arresthuset - det tidl. rådhus i Næstved		Ramsherred 2, 4700 Næstved	1938	Extension of Tinghuset from 1938 by Johannes Tidemand-Dal.
Gavnø		Gavnø 2, 4700 Næstved	55°11′19.78″N 11°43′30.55″E	The three-winged main building originally built in c. 1400 but heavily adapted in 1755 probably by Jacob Fortling
Gavnø: Gardener's House		Gavnø 11, 4700 Næstved	c. 1800	House from c. 1800.
Gavnø: Gardener's House		Gavnø 13, 4700 Næstved		Stables.
Hammershus		Byvej 11, 4700 Næstved		House with clay walls from c. 1813.
Hammershus		Byvej 11, 4700 Næstved		House with clay walls from c. 1813.
Hammershus		Byvej 11A, 4700 Næstved		House with clay walls from c. 1813.
Hammershus		Byvej 11B, 4700 Næstved		House with clay walls from c. 1813.
Hammershus		Byvej 11C, 4700 Næstved		House with clay walls from c. 1813.
Harrestedgård		Slagelsevej 283C, 4700 Næstved	55°14′52.84″N 11°30′47.72″E	Building from the Middle Ages and the 1840s
Herlufsholm		Herlufsholm Alle 170, 4700 Næstved		
Herlufsholm		Herlufsholm Alle 170, 4700 Næstved		
Herlufsholm		Herlufsholm Alle 170, 4700 Næstved		
Herlufsholm		Herlufsholm Alle 170, 4700 Næstved		
Herlufsholm		Herlufsholm Alle 170, 4700 Næstved		
Herlufsholm		Herlufsholm Alle 170, 4700 Næstved		
Herlufsholm		Herlufsholm Alle 170, 4700 Næstved		
House of the Holy Ghost		Ringstedgade 4A, 4700 Næstved	55°13′56.33″N 11°45′30.25″E	Building from c. 1420
Hotel Vinhuset		Sct Peders Kirkeplads 4, 4700 Næstved	55°13′50.92″N 11°45′27.64″E	The buildings facing Kirkepladsen and Vinhusstræde from 1778 and later as well as the vaulted cellar from c. 1500
Kompagnihuset		Kompagnistræde 3, 4700 Næstved	55°13′44.93″N 11°45′28.42″E	Building from c. 1500 and the attached half-timbered building.
Næstved Old Town Hall		Sct Peders Kirkeplads 5A, 4700 Næstved		Gothic style former town hall from c. 1450 and c. 1520.
Ostenfeldts Stiftelse		Ostenfeldtsvej 7, 4700 Næstved		Main building from 1841.
Ostenfeldts Stiftelse		Ostenfeldtsvej 7, 4700 Næstved		
Riddergade 1 A		Riddergade 1A, 4700 Næstved		
Riddergade 1 A		Riddergade 1A, 4700 Næstved		
Riddergade 3: Ridderhuset		Riddergade 3, 4700 Næstved	55°13′45.26″N 11°45′35.65″E	House from 1589
Riddergade 5: Apostelhuset		Riddergade 5A, 4700 Næstved	55°13′45.04″N 11°45′35.36″E	Building from the 1410s
Riddergade 7		Riddergade 7, 4700 Næstved		Building on Riddergade and the side wing along Slagkildevej.
Rønnebæksholm: Grundtvig's Pavilion		Rønnebæksholm 1, 4700 Næstved	55°13′12.32″N 11°47′39.93″E	Pavilion from 1852 designed by J. D. Herholdt and associated with N. F. S. Grundtvig
Saltø		Saltøvej 59, 4700 Næstved	55°13′37.85″N 11°37′56.53″E	Two-winged main building of which the eastern part of the north wing dates from the Late Middle Ages and the western part of the north wing and the east wing date from the second half of the 16th century
Saltø		Saltøvej 59, 4700 Næstved	55°13′37.85″N 11°37′56.53″E	Half-timbered wing from the 18th century
Saltø		Saltøvej 59, 4700 Næstved	55°13′37.85″N 11°37′56.53″E	Half-timbered wing from the 18th century
Sankt Peders Kirkeplads 3 og Kirkestræde 3		Sct Peders Kirkeplads 3, 4700 Næstved		
Sankt Peders Kirkeplads 3 og Kirkestræde 3		Kirkestræde 3, 4700 Næstved		
Stenboderne		Sct Peders Kirkeplads 8, 4700 Næstved		
Stenboderne		Sct Peders Kirkeplads 10, 4700 Næstved		
Stenboderne		Sct Peders Kirkeplads 12, 4700 Næstved		

=== 4733 Tappernøje ===
Listing name	Image	Location	Coordinates	Sescription
Bækkeskov		Bækkeskov Alle 1, 4733 Tappernøje	55°11′26.35″N 12°0′54.42″E	Main building from 1796-98
Borrehøjgård		Teglværksvej 4, 4733 Tappernøje	55°9′23.02″N 11°56′45.75″E	Former residence of the local mayor dating from c. 1730 but later expanded with 3 bays
Engelholm		Engelholmvej 3, 4733 Tappernøje	55°8′28.06″N 11°58′54.46″E	Main building from 1781-85
Snesere Rytterskole		Bårsevej 4, 4733 Tappernøje	55°9′50.99″N 11°55′53.66″E	A so-called rytterskole from 1724
Snesere Tromlehus		Bårsevej 3D, 4733 Tappernøje	1798	Sprøjte- og tromlehuset from c. 1928 designed by Julius Rasmussen-

=== 4736 Karrebæksminde ===
Listing name	Image	Location	Coordinates	Sescription
Karrebæk Windmill		Karrebækvej 852, 4736 Karrebæksminde	55°11′31.61″N 11°30′18.28″E	Smock mill from c. 1860

== Delisted buildings ==
Listing name	Image	Location	Coordinates	Sescription
Hotel Axelhus		Axeltorv 9A, 4700 Næstved	55°13′50.92″N 11°45′27.64″E	Building from 1784 but later expanded with an extra floor
