= Viborggård, Næstved Municipality =

Three-winged farm in Denmark

Viborggård
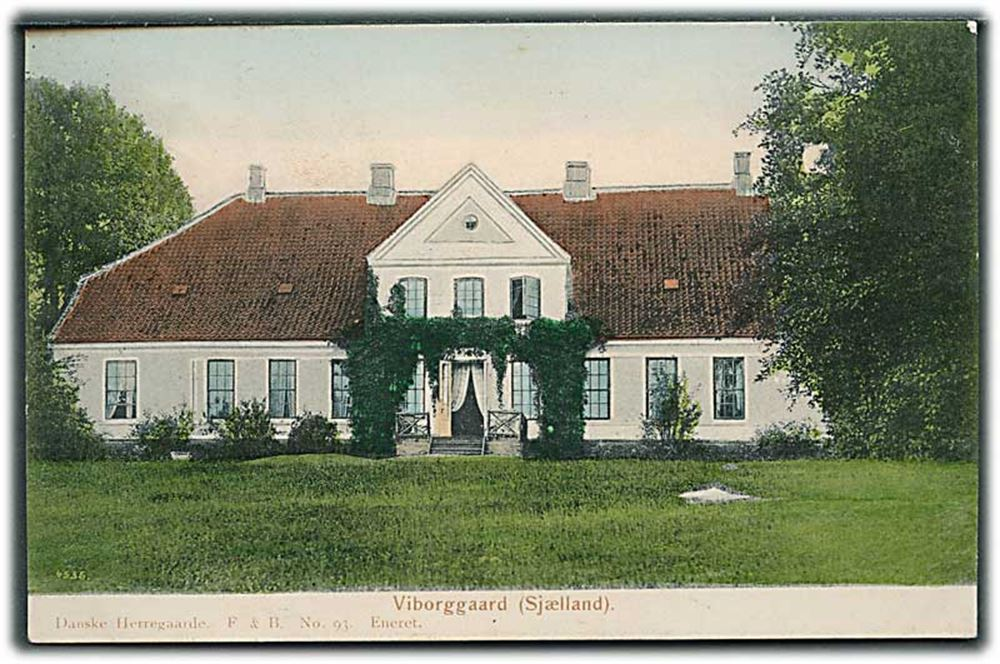

General information
- Location: Næstved Municipality, Fensmarkvej 9, 4160 Herlufmagle, Denmark
- Coordinates: 55°18′10.08″N 11°46′33.46″E
- Completed: 1800

Viborggård is a three-winged farm situated close to Herlufmagle, north of Fensmark Skov, Næstved Municipality, Denmark. The Neoclassical main wing from around 1800 was listed on the Danish registry of protected buildings and places in 1945. The two flanking farm wings are not part of the heritage listing.

== History ==
=== 19th century ===
Viborggård was for centuries operated as a farm under either Holmegård or Gisselfeld.

The present main building was constructed in around 1800 (at least one source mentions 1808) for Edvard Snedorph Hammer, who served as pastor of Herlufmagle Parish from 1795 to 1829, He had previously served as hovmesterfor count Christian Conrad Sophus Danneskiold-Samsøe with whom he was in Leipzig at the time of his appointment. He was the same year married to Christiane Sophie von Kleist (1771- 186262), daughter of colonel in the Cavalry Regiment and chamberlain Christian Frederik von Kleist. Christiane Hammer (née von Kleist) until her death in 1862.

In the years around 1870, Viborggård was the residence of count Rudolph Ahlefeldt. In 1889, it was the residence of Knud Trolle Post.

=== 20th century ===
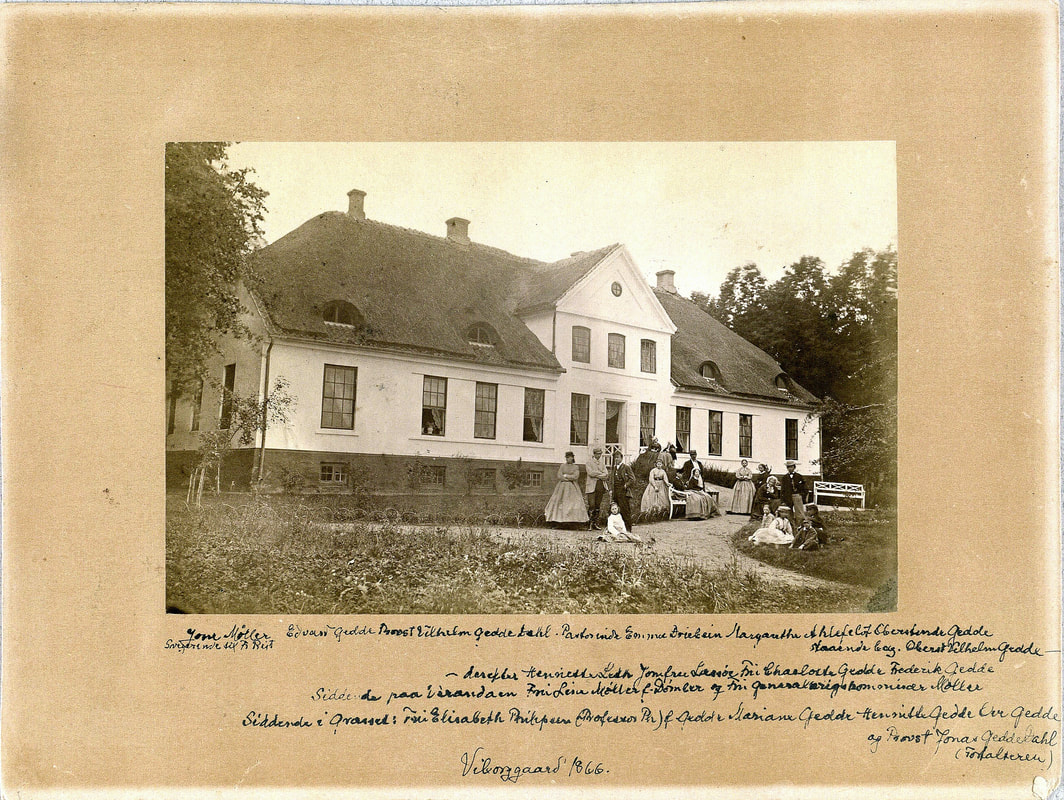
Viborggård's main building

Viborggård belonged to Ove Frederik Gedde (1851-1907) in 1901. He was married to Charlotte née Hermansen. The estate was at some point acquired by Ove Bille Hansen. In 1021, it was bought by Th. Beck. In 1925, it changed hands again when it was acquired by the engineer and industrialist C.F. Jarl. He resided in a villa in Copenhagen's fashionable Rosenvænget neighbourhood. Viborggård was later owned by Sonja Jensen until 1007. The next owner was Poul Fritzner.

== Architecture ==
The 11 bays long Neoclassical main wing is constructed in brick, white-washed and topped by a hip roof. The symmetrical facade features a two-bay, gabled wall dormer. The garden is located to the north of the house. It is accessed from the building via a monumental staircase.

== Today ==
Viborggaard was acquired by Povl Fritzner in 1996. He is still managing the estate but ownership has been transferred to his daughters Sara and Anne. Most of the 490 hectares of land are used for cultivation of sugar beets. In 2015, he gave up pig breeding on the estate. His is chairman of Øers Landboforeninger, fmd. Roskilde Dyrskue and Roskilde Dyrskue as well as a board member of Landbrug & Fødevare. He was a board member of Gefion from 1987 to 2019.

== List of owners ==
- (1800-1829) Edvard Snedorph Hammer
- (1829-1862) Christiane Hammer (née von Kleist)
- ( - ) Ove Frederik Gedde
- (?-1912) Ove Bille Hansen
- (1912-1925) Th. Beck
- (1925- ) C.F. Jarl
- (?-1996) Sonja Jensen
- (1996-) Poul Fritzner
- {-present) Sara and Anne Fritzner
