= Næstved Cavalry Barracks =

Coordinates: 55.2320°N 11.7617°E

Næstved Cavalry Barracks (Danish: Rytterkasernen), also known as Grønnegade Barracks (Danish: Grønnegades Kaserne), is a former military installation now operated as a cultural centre in Næstved, Denmark. Five of the buildings were listed on the Danish registry of protected buildings and places in 1945.

== History ==
The barracks were established in 1798 as a new home for the Zealand Cavalry Regiment (Sjællandske Rytterregiment). in 1917, it was taken over by the Sjællandske Lansenérregiment. In 1842, it was taken over by the 4th Dragoon Regiment. In 1923–1951, it housed the Rytteriets Befalingsmandsskole. In 1951–1969, it housed Pansertroppernes Befalingsmandsskole.The barracks were decommissioned by the Danish Army in 1978. They were subsequently transferred to Næstved Municipality.

== Buildings ==
=== Old Equestrian House ===
The eldest building is a former equestrian house constructed in 1799 to designs by Andreas Kirkerup. It is now known as Det Gamle Ridehus (The Old Equestrian House). The building is today used as an exhibition space and for meetings.

=== Old Fencing Building ===
The Old Fencing Building (Den Gamle Fægtesalsbygning), also known as New Barracks (Den Nye Kaserne), is located next to the Old Equestrian House. It was constructed in 1855 to designs by military officer and architect F. F. Ramlau for the 2nd Dragoon Regiment. It is today used as office space and administration building.

=== Commandant's House ===
The Commandant's House (Kommandantboligen) dates from 1806. The northern side wing was added in 1855 by F. F. Ramlau. The building is used as administration and contains facilities for local associations.

=== Stable Building ===
The Stable Building (Staldbygningen) was constructed in 1804 for the Zealand Cavalry Regiment. In 1855, when the Fencing Building was also constructed, it was expanded with storage space for equipment and animal feed. In 1997, it was expanded with a special section for sick horses. The building contains a section with stabling, a large hall with foyer and bar facilities, premises for associations and a graphic workshop.

=== New Equestrian House ===
The New Equestrian House dates from 1888 and was constructed for the 4th Dragoon Regiment. In 2001, it was refurbished and expanded with a foyer. It is now used as a music venue under the name Vershuset.

== Cultural references ==
Grønnegade Barracks has been used as a location in the films Soldaterkammerater rykker ud (1959), Frøken Nitouche (1963), Hurra for de blå husarer (1970) and Babettes gæstebud (1987).
