= Broksø =

Manor house bear Næstved, Denmark

- Interactive map of the Broksø area

General information
- Location: Broksøvej 60; 4160 Herlufmagle, Denmark
- Coordinates: 55°18′22.01″N 11°50′5.3″E
- Completed: 1916

Broksø is a manor house and estate located 10 km northwest of Næstved, between Skuderløse and Herlufmagle, Næstved Municipality, in southeastern Denmark. The manor was established in 1675 and had the same owners as nearby Holmegaard until 1801. It was then owned by the Post family from 1801 to 1925 and has most recently been owned by the Riegels family since 1931. The current main building is from 1915 to 1916 but its design is inspired by traditional Renaissance style manor houses. The estate covers approximately 1,000 hectares of land.

== History ==
=== Frans and Kai Lykke ===
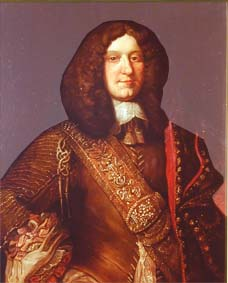
Kai Lykke

Broksø (formerly Broxøe) was established in 1650 when Frans Lykke til Gisselfeld merged two farms, naming the estate after his wife Elisabeth Brok. The suffix -ø (meaning "island") is a reference to the main building's location on Spragelse ø, a small peninsula surrounded by bogland. Lykke was also the owner of the estates Gisselfeld and Rantzausholm. All three estates were after his death in 1657 passed to his son Kai Lykke.

In 1601, Lykke was sentenced to a great fine after accusing Queen Sophie Amalie of adultery in a letter which was exposed to the king. When he fled to Skåne instead of paying, he was sentenced to death for Lèse-majesté, was executed in his absence and had his property in Denmark confiscated. Gisselfeld, including Broksø, was initially granted to Crown Prince Christian (V). Broksø and ten other farms were later placed under Holmegaard.

=== Krabbe, Trolle and Restorff families ===
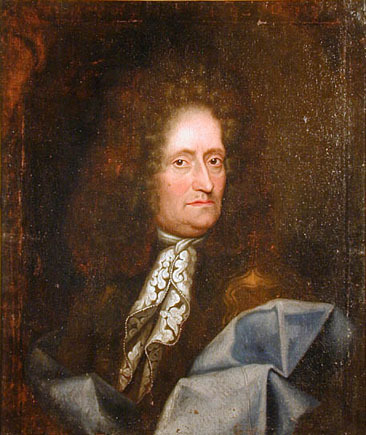
Otto Krabbe

In 1670, Frederik III granted Holmegaard to his page, Otto Krabbe. In 1675, Holmegaard and Broksø were both granted status of manors. Krabbe was promoted to chamberlain shortly after Christian V's ascend to the throne. A few years later, he was appointed to county governor (amtmand) of Tryggevælde. Otto Krabbe's widow, Birgitte Skeel, kept Holmegaard and Broksø after her husband's death in 1719. Their three children had all died in an early age. Birgitte Skeel bequeathed Holmegaard and Broksø to Otto Krabbe's niece, Birgitte Restorff, who married Knud Trolle later that same year. Birgitte Restorff, who outlived her husband by 30 years, kept the estates until her death in 1790.

=== The Post family ===
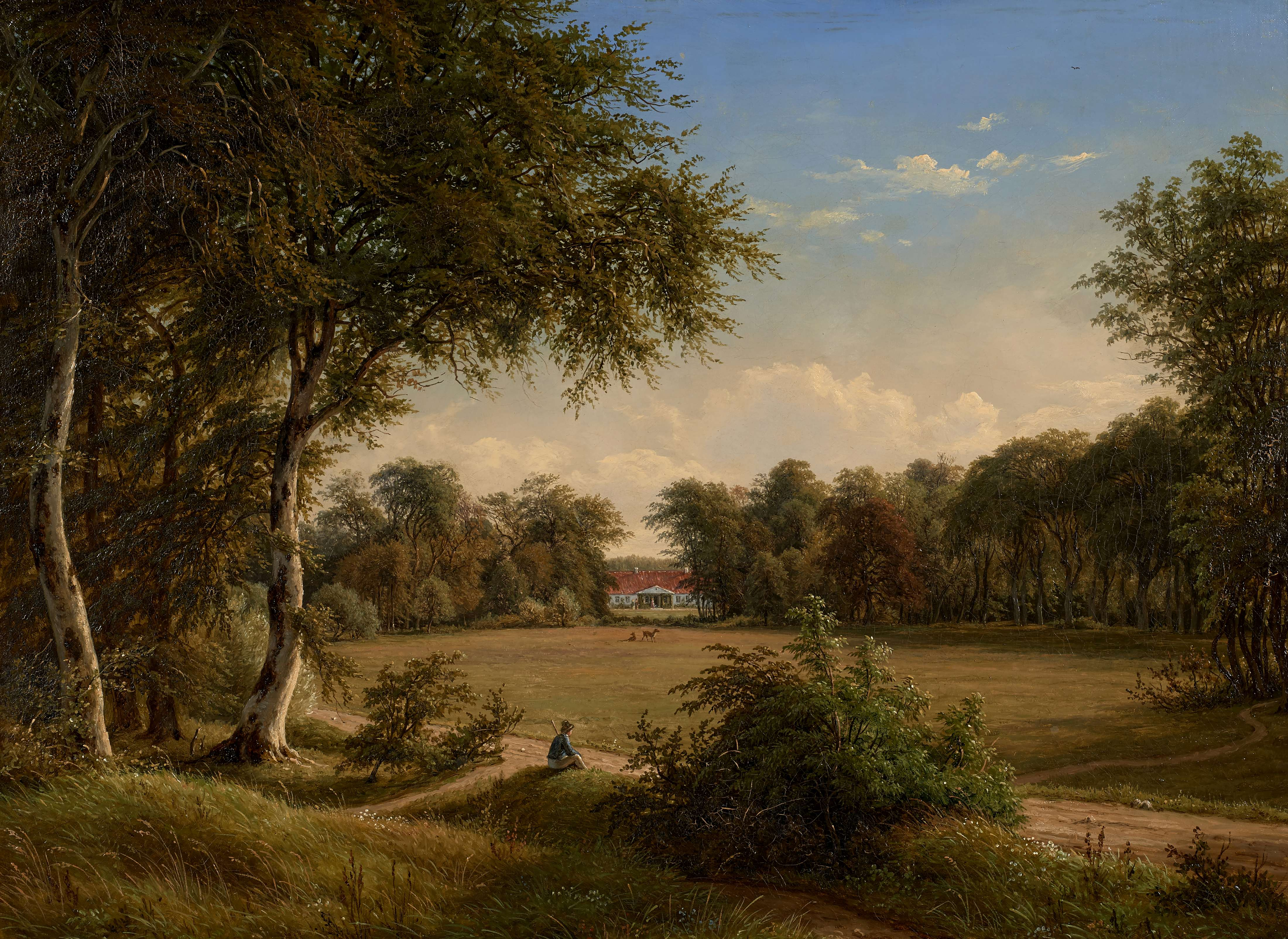
F. C. Kiærschou: View of Broksø Manor, 1851

Having no children, Restorff bequeathed her estates to her niece, Margrethe Elisabeth Restorff, who was married to Peder Lasson von Post. In 1801, he sold Holmegaard and Broksø to Christian Conrad, Count of Danneskiold-Samsøe. In 1802, Peder Lasson von Post's third eldest son, Carl Ludvig Post, bought Broksø back from Danneskiold-Samsøe. He was later succeeded first by his son and later by his grandson as owner of Broksø. His grandson's widow, Margrethe Post, constructed a new main building in 1914–16.

=== The Madelung and Riegels families ===
In 1925, Margrethe Post sold Broksø to K. Ekstrøm. The estate was the following year sold to Peter Madelung. Peter Madelung had previously owned Tårnborg at Korsør and Hollufgaard at Odense.

In 1931, Broksø was acquired by Hans Vilhelm Riegels. He had made a fortune in the timber industry working for the East Asiatic Company in the Far East. After his return to Denmark, he had most recently been the managing director of H.C. Christiansen A/S.

== Architecture ==
The current main building from 1915 to 1916 was designed by Gustav Bartholin Hagen. The building consists of two storeys under a tall hip roof clad in red tiles. The walls are white-washed. The front of the building features a three-storey median risalit with a monumental staircase and two lower corner pavilions with hip roofs. The facade towards the gardens feature two projecting, octagonal corner towers with conical red tile roofs.

Avlsgården, a half-timbered complex of farm buildings, date from before 1850. In 1972, Riegels ceded Broksø to his daughter Charlotte Riegels Hjorth.

== Today ==
The estate has a total area of approximately 1,000 hectares.

== Cultural references ==
- Broksø is mentioned in poems by Christian Winther and Karl Gjellerup.
- Broksø has been used as a location in the feature films To som elsker hinanden (1944), Slottet (1964) and Marco effekten (2021).

== List of owners ==
- ( -1657) Frans Lykke
- (1657–1661) Kai Lykke
- (1661–1670) The Crown
- (1670–1719) Otto Krabbe
- (1719–1737) Birgitte Skeel, gift Krabbe
- (1737) Birgitte Restorff, gift Trolle
- (1737–1760) Knud Trolle
- (1760–1790) Birgitte Restorff, gift Trolle
- (1790–1801) Peder Lasson von Post
- (1801–1802) Christian Conrad, Count of Danneskiold-Samsøe
- (1802–1845) Carl Ludvig Post
- (1845–1878) Peter Frederik Post
- (1878–1911) Frederik Vilhelm Post
- (1911–1925) Margrethe Hansen, gift Post
- (1925–1926) K. Ekstrøm
- (1926) C. Madelung
- (1926) H. Madelung
- (1926–1931) Peter Madelung
- (1931–1972) Hans Vilhelm Riegels
- (1972–2003) Charlotte Riegels Hjorth
- (2003- ) Cathrine Riegels Gudbergsen
