= Ostenfeldts Stiftelse =

Building in Næstved, Denmark

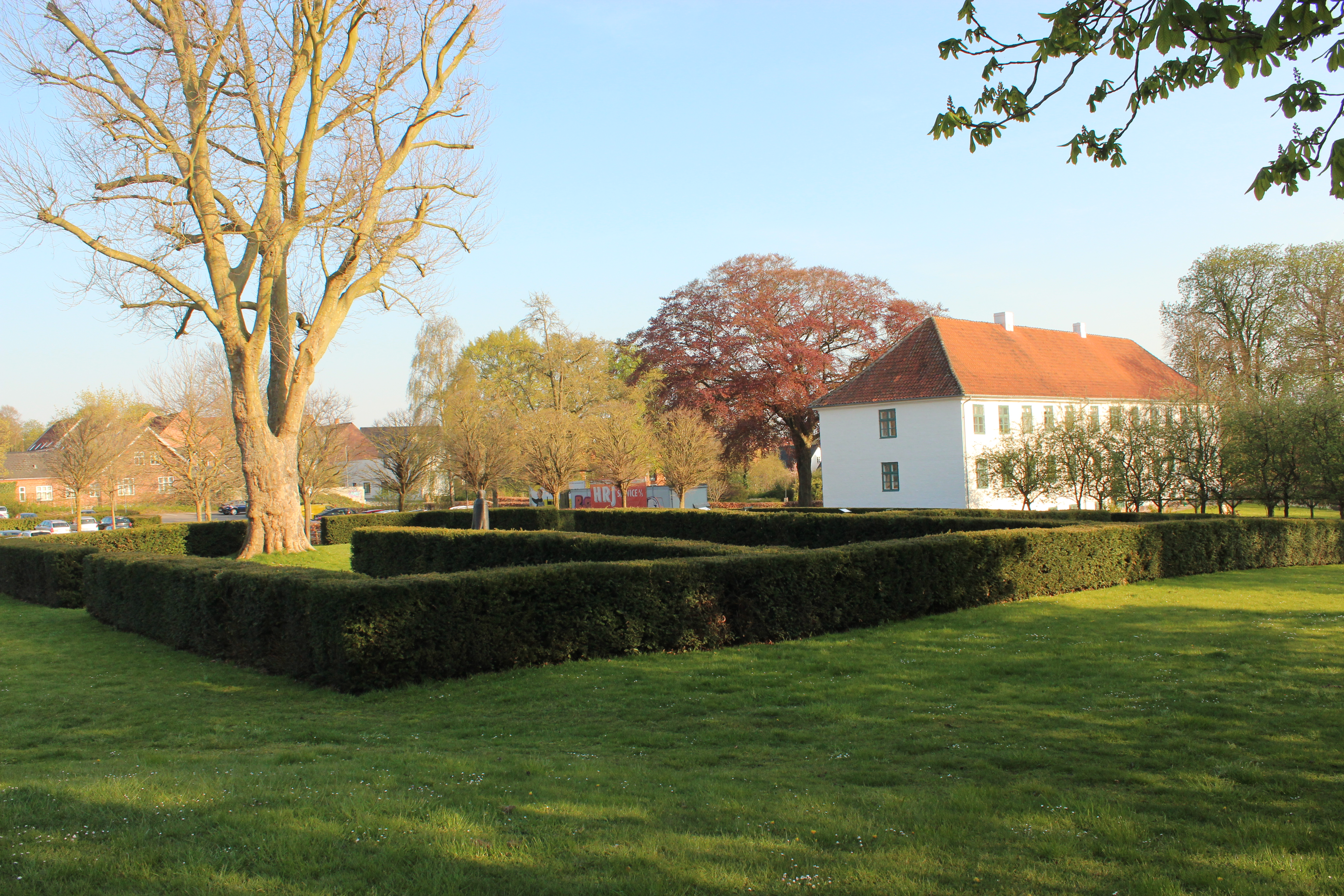
- Interactive map of the Ostenfeldts Stiftelse area

General information
- Architectural style: Neoclassical
- Location: Næstved, Ostenfeldtsvej 7, 4700 Næstved, Denmark
- Coordinates: 55°13′39.25″N 11°45′34.34″E
- Completed: 1841

Ostenfeldts Stiftelse is a charitable housing complex situated just southeast of the historic town centre of Næstved, Denmark. The two-storey Neoclassical brick building and a former stable were listed on the Danish register of protected buildings and places in 1945. It contains 12 dwellings for women over the age of 50.

== History ==
Christian Ostenfeldt (28 November 1738 – 29 May 1818) was a master painter in Sæby in northern Jutland. By testament in 1802, he left behind his estate as a fund, named Den Ostenfeldtske Stiftelse. The aim of the foundation was to create affordable accommodation for widows and unmarried daughters of civil servants and other burgers. In 1816, Ostenfeld moved the operations to Næstved. He died just two years later. He was buried in the local St. Peter's Cemetery.

The foundation bought Sortebrødregård, a former Black Friars Priory. Construction started in 1840. The building was completed in 1841.

When St. Peter's Cemetery was shut down in 1850, Ostenfeldt's remains were moved to Ostenfeldts Stiftelse grounds. A monument to Ostenfeldt was erected on the site in 1855.

The park-like surroundings were refurbished in 1921. The buildings were listed on the Danish register of protected buildings and places in 1945.

The building was refurbished in 2014–16. This was done with economic support from the A. P. Møller Foundation.

== Architecture ==
The building is constructed in large munkesten bricks on a plinth of granite ashlars. Large munkesten bricks from the previous building on the site were used in the construction of the building. The facade of the building is plastered and white-painted. It is topped by a hipped roof clad in red tile. The main entrance features a trapezoid, Hellenistic portal inspired by Gottlieb Bindesbøll's Thorvaldsens Museum in Copenhagen (completed in 1839). Above the main entrance is a plaque with an inscription and the year "1840".

== Gallery ==
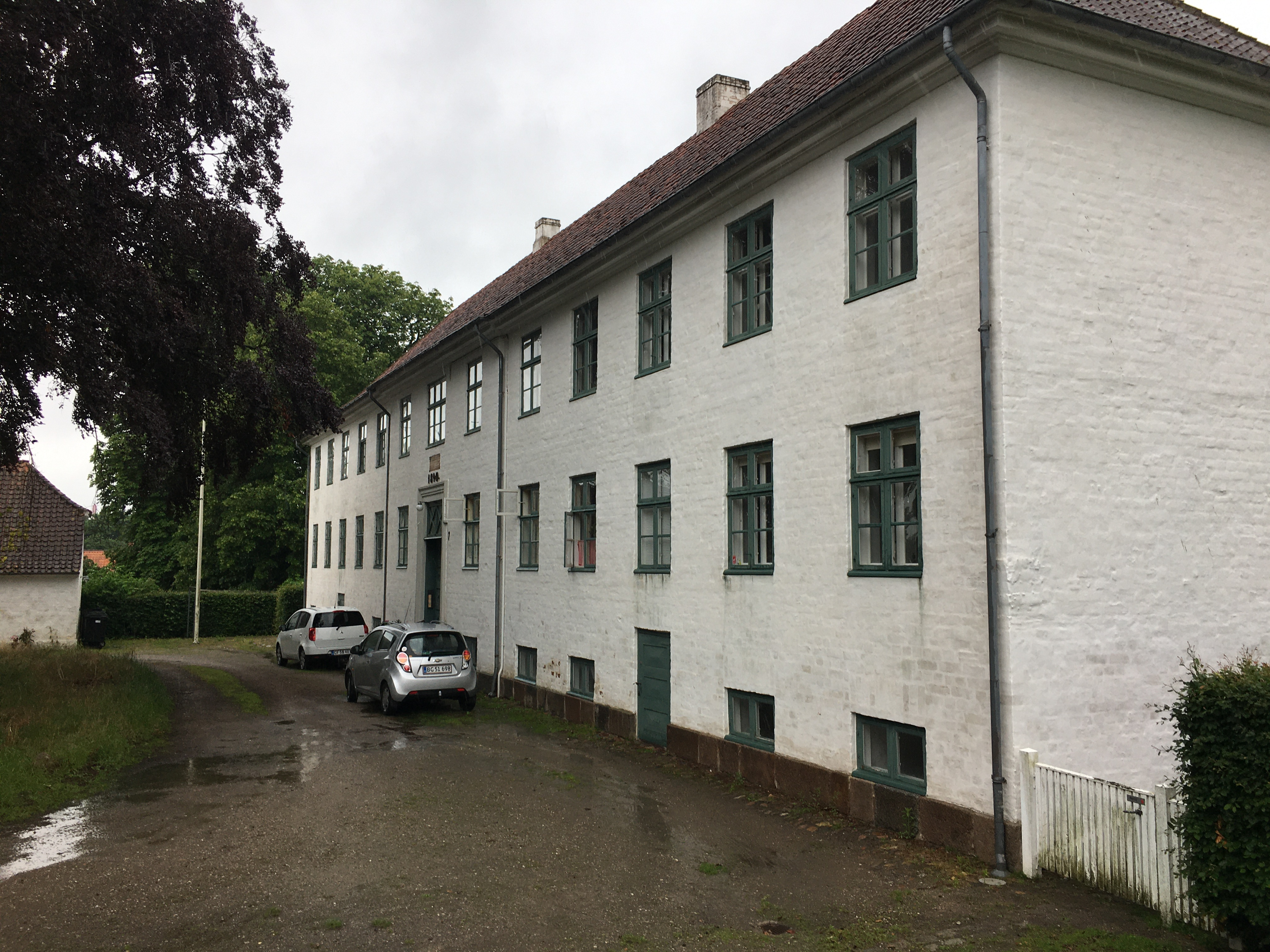
Main building

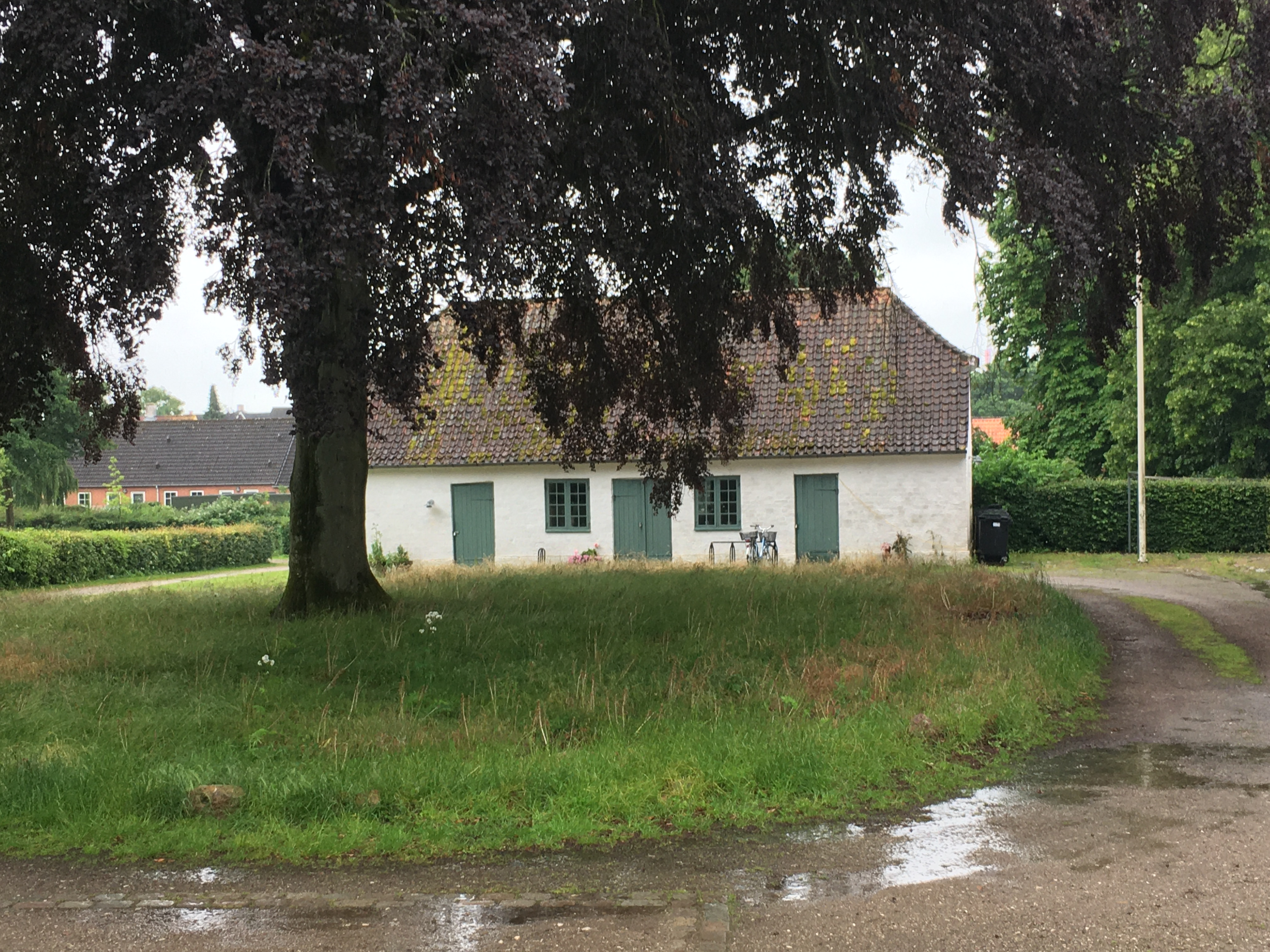
The former stable.

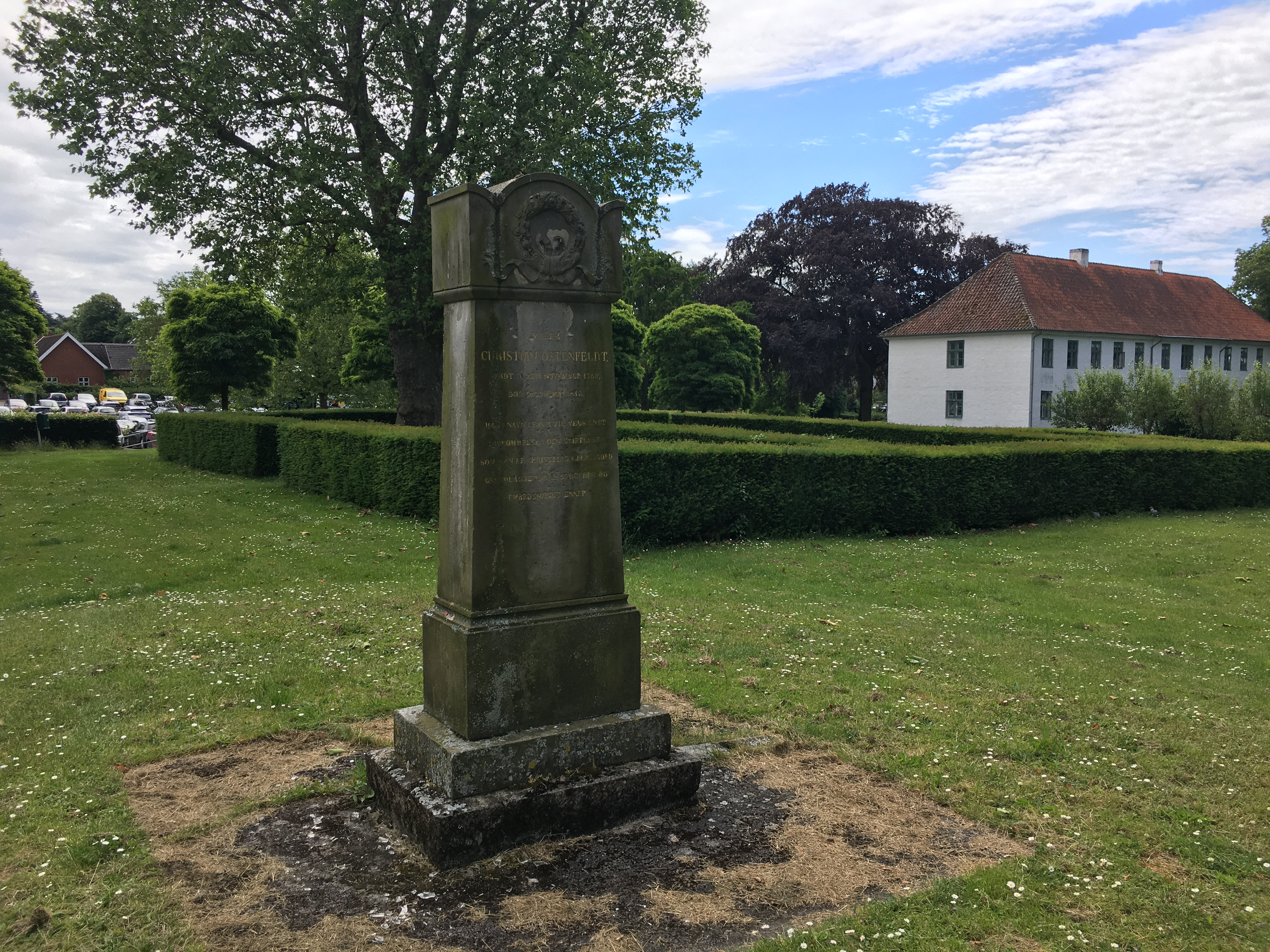
The Christian Ostenfeld memorial.
