= Farumgård =

House om Farum, Denmark

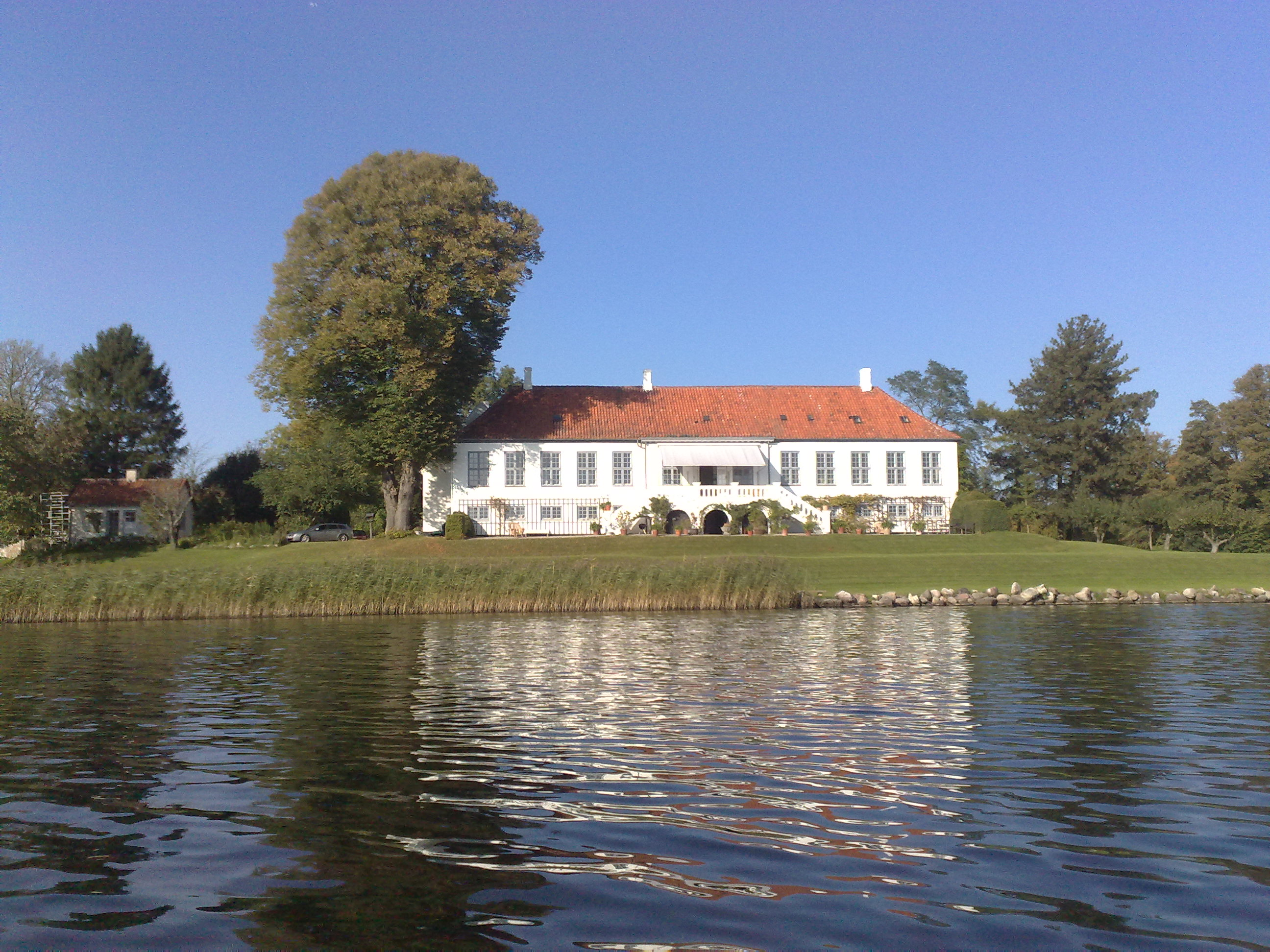
- Interactive map of the Farumgård area

General information
- Architectural style: Baroque
- Location: Søvej 8; 3520 Farum, Denmark
- Coordinates: 55°48′21.54″N 12°21′38.64″E
- Completed: 1706

Design and construction
- Architect: François Dieussart

Farumgård is a former manor house overlooking Farum Lake at Farum, Furesø Municipality, in the north-western outskirts of Copenhagen, Denmark. It is located just east of Farum Church and the original Farum village. The land has been sold off and redeveloped, except for the 6 hectares park which is laid out in the Baroque style.

== History ==
=== Church and Crown land ===
The first known reference to Farumgård is from 1370 when it was a farm under the Bishop Seat in Roskilde. It was the administrative centre of their possessions around the villages of Farum, Lynge and Lillerød. From 1456 and for the next hundred years, the estate was held in fee by members of the Skovgaard family.

Farumgård was confiscated by the Crown in connection with the Reformation. The king generally put the estate at the disposal of lower-ranked officers and court officials, such as heralds, coachmen and court apothecaries. One of them was in the 16th century granted the necessary means for building a new half-timbered main building.

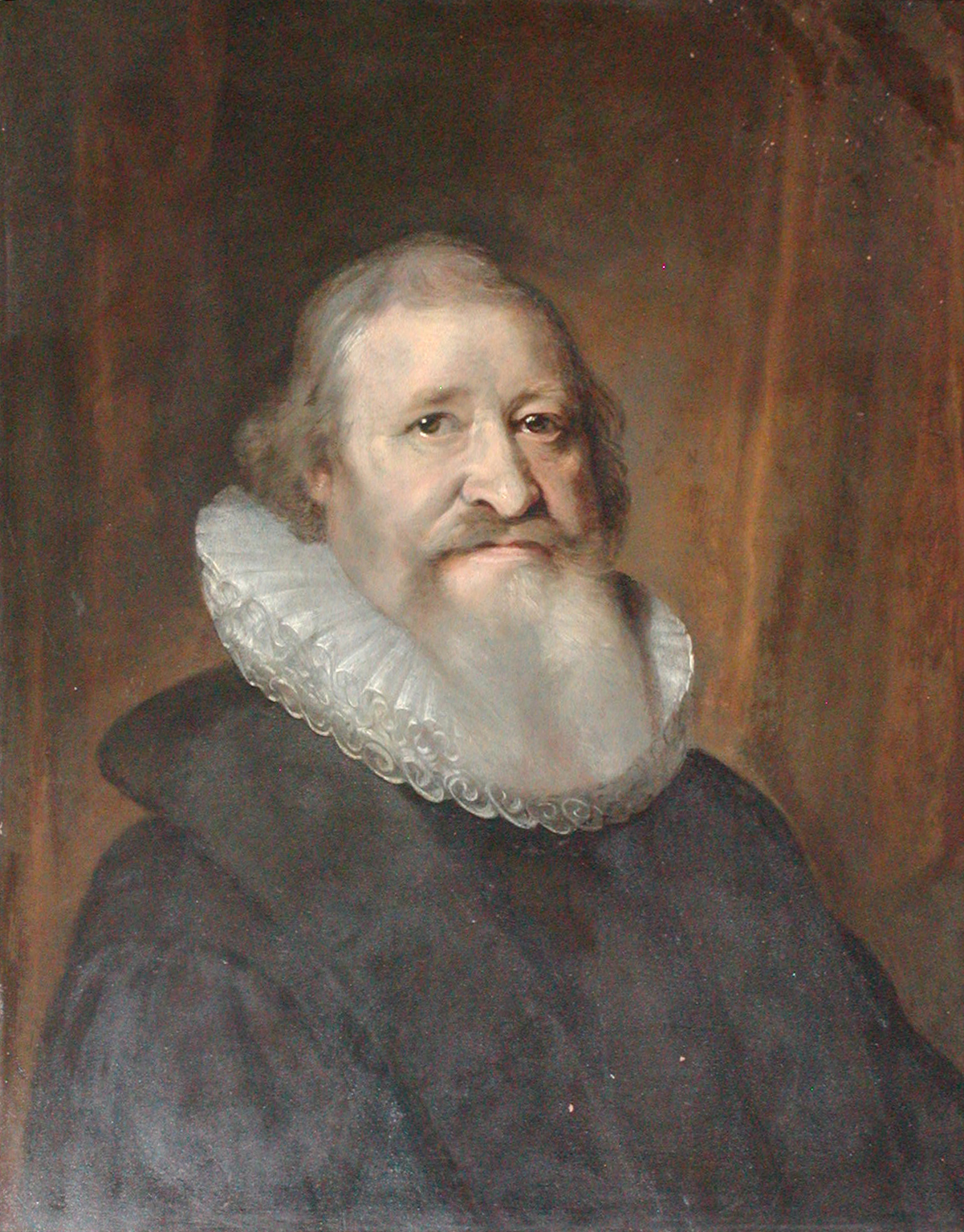
Hans Svane

=== Changing owners ===
In 1666, King Frederick III parted with the property when he ceded it to Hans Svane, who had laboured for the introduction of the hereditary monarchy in 1660, a favour he had already been generously rewarded for with appointments, titles and several other estates. Svane died just two years after he was granted Farumgaard and after that the estate changed hands numerous times.

=== 20th century ===
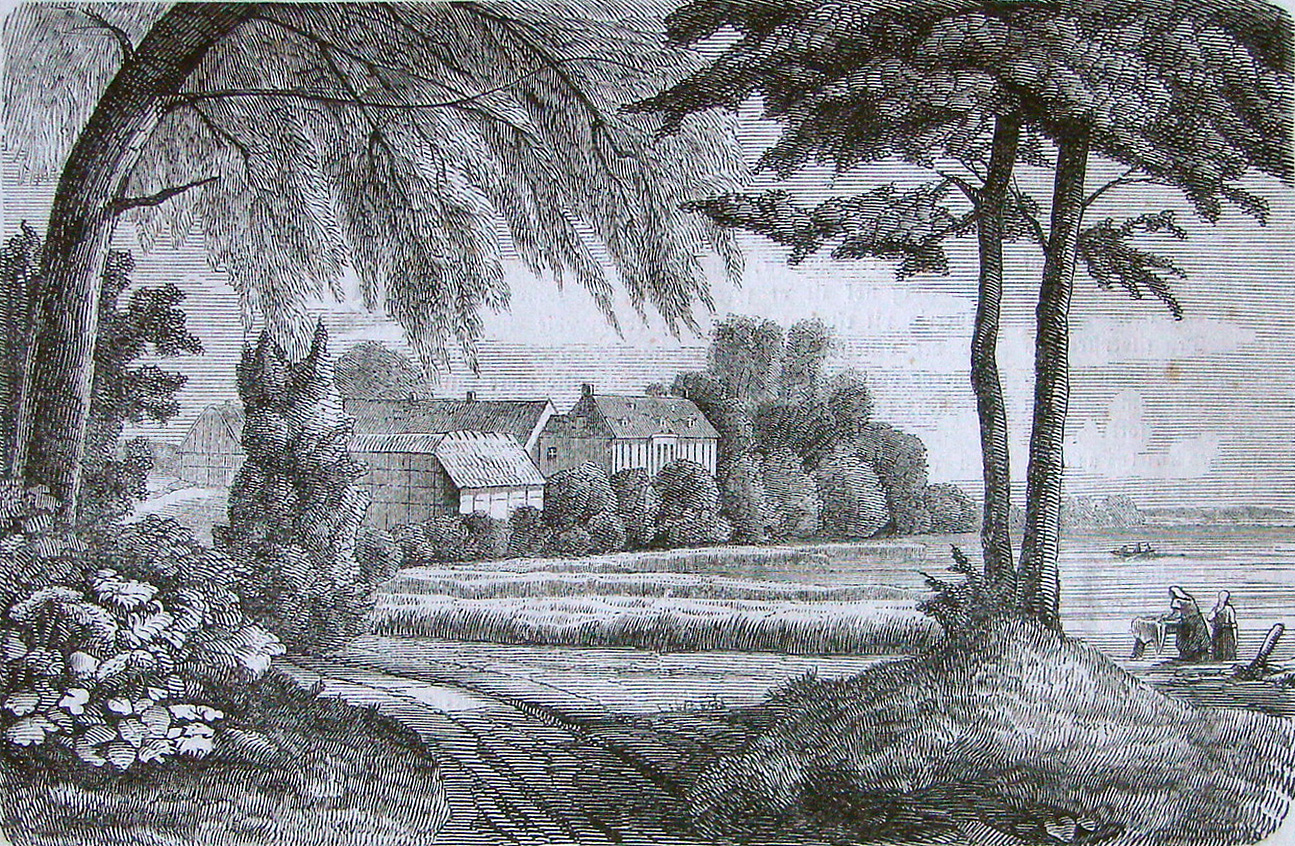
Farumgård in 1860

Most of the land was sold off in lots in 1906. In 1910 the house and remaining land were acquired by Elisabeth Mozart Jensen, a wealthy widow, who owned it until her death in 1932. The property was then purchased by the German St. Ursula Sisters who ran it as a recovery home until 1960. In 1965 it passed back into private ownership and has remained in the same family since.

== Ongoing legal battle ==
From 1949 the gardens and lakeside path of Farumgård were open to public pedestrian access. This changed in 2017 when, after an alleged altercation between a cyclist and a gardener, the owner Kresten Andersen Bergsøe blocked public access to the grounds of the property. This prompted the local council to report the owner to police for violating conservation and access laws, after which followed a public prosecution of the owner. In June 2018 the municipal court in Lyngby ruled in favour of the owner, on the grounds that the original 1949 agreement allowed him to block access on grounds of "significant inconvenience". The local council and public prosecutor decided in July 2018 to appeal this decision to a higher court. In June 2019, it was reported that the higher court had refused to process the appeal.

== Architecture ==
The current main building was completed in 1705. It was designed in 1705 by François Dieussart who was at the same time working on Sorgenfri House. It is a three-winged Rococo-style building.

== Park ==
The park covers 6 hectares and was in 1913 returned to its former Baroque style by Elisabeth Mozart Jensen who owned Farumgaard from 1910 until 1932. The park was protected in 1965 and is considered one of the finest examples of Danish Baroque gardens.

== List of owners ==
- (1370–1536) Roskilde Bispestol
- (1536–1666) Kronen
- (1666–1668) Hans Svane
- (1668–1675) Frederik Vittinghoff Scheel
- (1675–1693) Adam Levin Knuth
- (1693–1704) Povl Vinding
- (1704–1716) Jens Rostgaard
- (1716–1741) Else Iversdatter, gift Rostgaard
- (1741–1743) Johan Lorentz Carstens
- (1743–1759) Søren Jensen Elsegaard
- (1759) Johan Piper
- (1759–1768) Christian Ditlev Frederik Reventlow
- (1768–1774) Frederik von der Maase
- (1774–1776) Sophie Henriette von der Maase née Moltke
- (1776–1782) Andreas Hauch
- (1782–1785) Charles August Selby
- (1785) Søren Kierulff
- (1785–1788) Bertel Nielsen Bøgvad
- (1788) Inger Münster, gift Bøgvad
- (1788–1790) Jens Clementsen
- (1790–1792) Carl Wilhelm Bang
- (1792–1798) Jens Lowson
- (1798–1806) Jacob Rosted
- (1806–1829) Peder de Svanenskiold
- (1829–1830) Heirs of Peder de Svanenskiold
- (1830–1840) Frederik Frederiksen
- (1840–1842) Ernst Bilsted
- (1842–1871) Johan Henrik Fensmark
- (1871–1882) Thalia Dorothea Louise Holck, gift Fensmark
- (1882–1886) Ole Frederik Ernst Fensmark
- (1886–1889) Jakob Frederik Scavenius
- (1889–1891) Per Scavenius
- (1891–1906) Einar Sehested
- (1906–1910) Udstykningsselskabet A/S Farumgaard
- (1910–1932) Elisabeth Mozart Jensen
- (1932– ) St. Ursula Stiftelse
- (1965–2002) Finn Riis–Hansen
- (1965–2002) Ruth Kongshaug Henriksen, gift 1) Andersen, 2) Riis–Hansen
- (2002–2003) Anne Mette Andersen, gift Bergsøe
- (2003–present) Kresten Andersen Bergsøe
