= Ravnstrup, Næstved Municipality =

Manor house and estate in Zealand, Denmark

Ravnstrup is a manor house and estate situated north of Næstved, on the southern part of Zealand, Denmark.

== History ==
=== Origins ===
The first known owner was Esbern Pedersen Krumpen, who owned the estate from 1396 to 1407. His son, Jens Esbernsen Krumpens. inherited Ravnstrup in 1407. He had no sons, and on his death in 1438 Ravnstrup was therefore passed on to his son-in-law, Herluf Nielsen Snekken, who was married to Jens Esbernsen Krumpen's daughter Gyde Krumpen.

=== Daa family ===
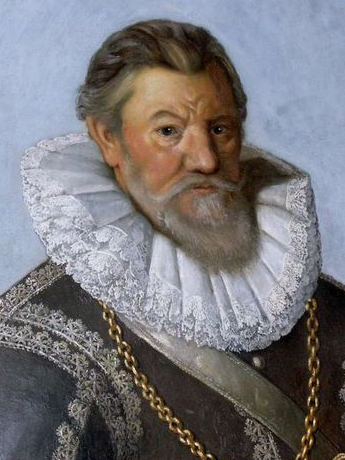
Claus Daa, who owned Ravnstrup 1600-1641 and was appointed to Admiral of the Realm in 1631

Herluf and Gyda Snekken had no sons either, and Ravnstrup was therefore passed on to their son-in-law Claus Daa through his marriage to their daughter Dorthe Herlugsdatter Snekken. Claus Daa, a knight and member of the Privy Council, owned Ravnstrup until his death in 1496, and the estate would after that remain in the hands of the Daa family for almost another 200 years. His son, Oluf Daa, was the owner from 1496–1532. His son, who was also called Claus Daa, was the owner from 1496 to 1532. His son, Oluf Daa, who was the owner from 1496 to´1532, constructed a new two-storey main building in 1595. Through his marriage, he also acquired another manor in the area, Holmegaard. His son, Claus Daa, took over both estates after his father's death in 1600. He became a major landowner after also acquiring the estates of Borreby and Fraugdegaard through his marriage to Dorthe Friis in 1618. He also expanded the Ravnstrup estate by buying up more land in the area and purchased Herlufmagle Church, where he constructed a chapel. In 1631, he was appointed Admiral of the Realm by Christian IV.

=== Changing owners, 1668–1800 ===
Christian Daa, Claus Daa'seldest surviving son by his second wife, who was the queen's avener, inherited Tavnstrup, Borreby and Fraugdegaard in 1641. He was ruined during the Swedish Wars and had to pledge his estate, which was taken over by Erik Krag, Oluf Rosenkrantz and Mathias Worm in 1668 and soon thereafter sold to Anders Jespersen Engberg. He once again expanded the estate through the acquisition of more land prior to his death in 1690. Tavnstrup was then passed on to his son-in-law Hector Gottfried Masius, a prominent theologian. He became the owner of several estates in the area. He died in 1709, and his children were ennobled by letters patent in 1712 with the name von der Maase. His son Christian von der Maase increased the number of tenant farms before selling the estate to Jacob Hjort in 1719.

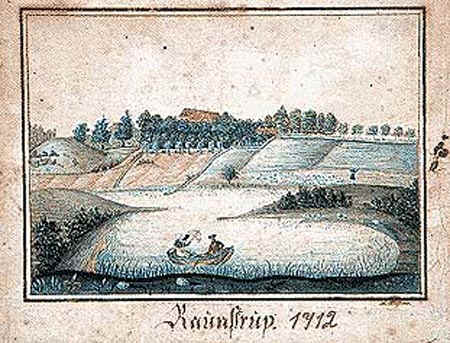
Ravnstrup in 1712

Friis sold the estate to Christian von der Maase's brother Frederiks con der Maase the following year. That same year he sold it to Edele Cathrine Kaas, the widow of Valentin von Eickstedt. The following year married Caspar Wessel, Tordenskjold's brother, who then became the owner. It was difficult times for Danish agriculture, and Wessel had to sell Ravnstrup in 1740 to pay off his debts.

In 1747, Ravnstrup was acquired by Niels de Hofman. He acquired more land and improved the buildings. In 1760, he sold Ravnstrup to count Eggert Christopher Knuth

In 1768, Ravnstrup was sold at auction to Jørgen Mauritsen. In 1778, he had to sell the estate due to economic difficulties. The buyer was Frederik Wilhelm Wedel-Jarlsberg.

=== 18th century ===
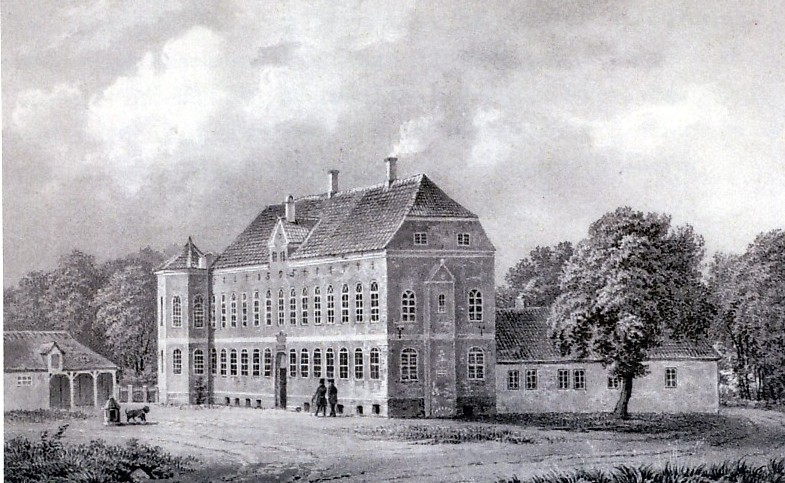
Oluf Daa's main building as it appeared before the fire

In 1805. Tavnstrup was acquired by Conrad Danneskiold-Samsøe. He was a strong supporter of the agricultural reforms of the time and made many contributions to the area. His widow, Johanne Henriette Valentine Kaas, ran the estate after her husband's death.

In 1844, Ravnstrup was sold at auction to Gustav Grüner, who acquired it for his son Georg Grüner. In 1851, he also acquired Lille Svendstrup. After his father's death, he also took over Kærup. Grüner's eldest son kept Kærup after his father's death, whereas Tavnstrup was sold to Victor Hahn. The estate changed hands many times over the next years. In 1929, G.C. Jessen sold the main building and park to G. Howden-Rønnenkamp. He rented it out as a summer camp. The main building was destroyed in a fire in 1947. It was then rebuilt to a smaller design and sold to B. Wejdling.

== Architecture ==
Oluf Daa's main building from 1494 was a two-storey building constructed in red brick, but it was rebuilt to a new design by Ole Hagen after the fire in 1947. It is now a one-storey building with a detached octagonal tower at its southeastern corner.

== Estate ==
The garden is located to the southeast of the main building and slopes down towards a small lake. To the northwest of the main building is a courtyard surrounded by farm buildings.

== Cultural references ==
Ravnstrup Manor appeared as the residence of A-38 in the 1989 DR television Christmas calendar Nissebanden i Grønland.

== List of owners ==
- (1396-1407) Esbern Pedersen Krumpen
- (1407- ) Jens Esbernsen Krumpen
- ( - ) Herluf Nielsen Snekken
- ( -1496) Claus Daa
- (1496-1532) Oluf Daa
- (1532-1575) Claus Daa
- (1575-1600) Oluf Daa
- (1600-1641) Claus Daa
- (1641-1668) Christian Daa
- (1668-1672) Erik Krag
- (1668-1672) Oluf Rosenkrantz
- (1668- ) Mathias Worm
- (1672- ) Jens Nielsen Spend
- (1672-1690) Anders Jespersen Engberg
- (1690-1709) Hector Gottfried Masius
- (1709-1719) Christian Masius von de Maase
- (1719-1720) Jakob Hjort
- (1720) Frederik von de Maase
- (1720-1721) Edele Cathrine, gift 1) Kaas, 2) Wessel
- (1721-1740) Caspar Wessel
- (1740-1747) Thomas Nielsen
- (1747-1760) Niels de Hofman
- (1760-1768) Eggert Christopher Knuth
- (1768-1778) Jørgen Mauritsen
- (1778-1805) Frederik Wilhelm Wedel-Jarlsberg
- (1805-1823) Conrad Danniskiold-Samsøe
- (1823-1843) Henriette Danneskiold-Samsøe bée Kaas
- (1843) Gustav Grüner
- (1843-1890) Georg Grüner
- (1890-1896) Rstate of Georg Grüner
- (1896-1917) Victor Hahn
- (1917-1918) Justus Ulrich
- (1918-1919) C. Jakheller
- (1919-1920) C. Wester
- (1920-1921) Johannes Berntsen
- (1921-1929) G.C. Jessen
- (1929- ) G. Howden-Rønnekamp
- (1936- ) U.O. Fischer-Rasmussen
- ( - ) E. Fischer-Rasmussen
- (2010- ) Hans Erik Larse
