= Georg Grüner (landowner) =

Danish landowner and politician (1817-1890)

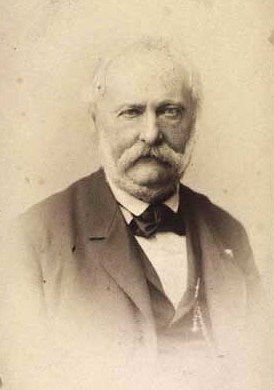
Georg Grüner

Johan Georg Røebye Grüner (26 October 1817 – 16 November 1890) was a Danish landowner, politician and co-founder of Landmandsbanken.

== Early life and education ==
Grüner was born on 26 October 1817 at Førslevgaard, the son of Gustav Grüner (1791–1869) and Mariane Birgitte Røebye (1795–1859). His father leased the estate from the owner Peter Johansen Neergaard. In 1827, his father bought the estate Kærup. Grüner matriculated from Sirø Academy in 1836 and acquired the Candidate of Law degree from the University of Copenhagen in 1842.

== Holdings ==
In 1843, Grüner's father bought Ravnstrup for him. In 1851, he also acquired Lille Svendstrup. After his father's death, he also took over Kærup.

== Politics and organisations ==
Together with Counts C. E. Frijs of Frijsenborg, J. Frijs of Juellinge and baron Otto Rosenørn-Lehn, he bought the Tersløsegård main building and garden in 1861, where the four Soranians established the Holberg Downer House (Holbergs Enkesæde). Grüner was a gifted, somewhat troubled man with many public interests. From 1844 he was a member of the Herlufmagle Parish Council and for almost a lifetime its chairman, In 1854–56, he also sat on the Præstø county council. Politically, he was distinctly conservative and as a friend of Count C. Frijs in the early and mid-1860s came to play a certain role in the nascent conservative organization. In 1861 he ran for a seat in for the Folketing in Køge and in 1864 took part in the foundation of the August Association. In 1866 he ran for the Folketing in Slagelse and in October was one of the founders of the October Association of whose board he became a member. In 1849 he established a local savings bank, In 1871 he was one of the founders of the Landmandsbanken (chairman of the bank council 1871–72 and again in -84) and in 1872 took the initiative to establish the United Municipalities' Old Age Pension Fund (De forenede kommuners alderdomsforsørgelseskasse), whose president he was until his death.

== Personal life ==
On 15 August 1867, in Copenhagen's Garrison Church, he married Clara Gudrun Simonsen (1850–1881). She was the daughter of civil servant in the Ministry for the Interior Carl Gisle Gunnar Simonsen (1813–84) and Ida Sofie Adamine Clara Rosalie Krogh-Kierulff (1824–1909).

He died on 16 November 1890 and is buried at Herlufmagle Cemetery.

== Awards ==
In 1846, he was awarded the title of jægermester. In 1971, he was awarded the title of hofjægermester ("Member of the Royal Hunt"). In 1882, he was appointed as chamberlain (hammerherre). He was created a Knight of the Order of the Dannebrog in 1865 and was awarded its Cross of Honour in 1874.
