= Claus Daa =

Danish admiral and nobleman (1579–1641)

Claus Olufsen Daa
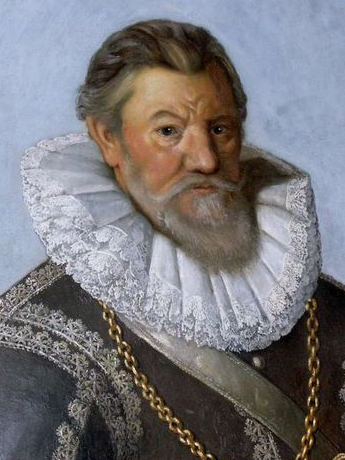

Admiral of the Realm
- In office 1631–1641
- Monarch: Christian IV

Personal details
- Born: 6 April 1579 Ravnstrup, Denmark
- Died: 30 March 1641 (aged 61)
- Profession: Rigsadmiral and landowner
- Awards: Knight of the Elephant

Claus Daa (6 or 10 April 1579 – 30 March 1641) was a Danish admiral, nobleman and landowner. He served as Admiral of the Realm from 1631 and was awarded the Order of the Elephant in 1633.

== Biography ==
Daa was born at Ravnstrup manor on Zealand, Denmark. He was the son of Oluf Daa (1547–1600) by his wife Dorthe Henriksdatter Faa née Friis (1543–1618). He went to school in Sorø and at age 12 went abroad to further his education. He spend most of the time in Geneva. He returned to Denmark for Christian IV's coronation in 1596 but travelled to Switzerland and France the following year where he stayed until 1559. He was a courtier (Hofsinde) at the royal court from 1600 to 1603. He became a Lieutenant in the heavy cavalry of Jutland in 1609, served with honour in the Kalmar War and was appointed to Ritmester. In 1625, he became a member of the Privy Council. In 1626, he was a war commissioner in Germany and a delegate to the Peace Meeting in Brunsvig but had to return to Denmark in August after falling ill.

In 1630, he was one of the members of the Privy Council that endorsed the king to reach a settlement with Hamburg. On 25 July he was appointed to Rigsadmiral. On 6 August he commanded the fleet that left Copenhagen to make an assault on the Hamburg fleet that blocked Glückstadt. The battle began on 4 September and resulted in a withdrawal of the Hamburg ships.

In 1631, Daa and Frederik Günther were sent to the Hague. He was to mediate between Great Britain and the Dutch Republic with Spain and negotiate with a British envoy about a continued alliance between Denmark-Norway and Great Britain and the payment of subsidies. In 1637, he became general commissioner for Zealand. In 1640, he was once again admiral for the fleet. He died in 1641.

== Property ==
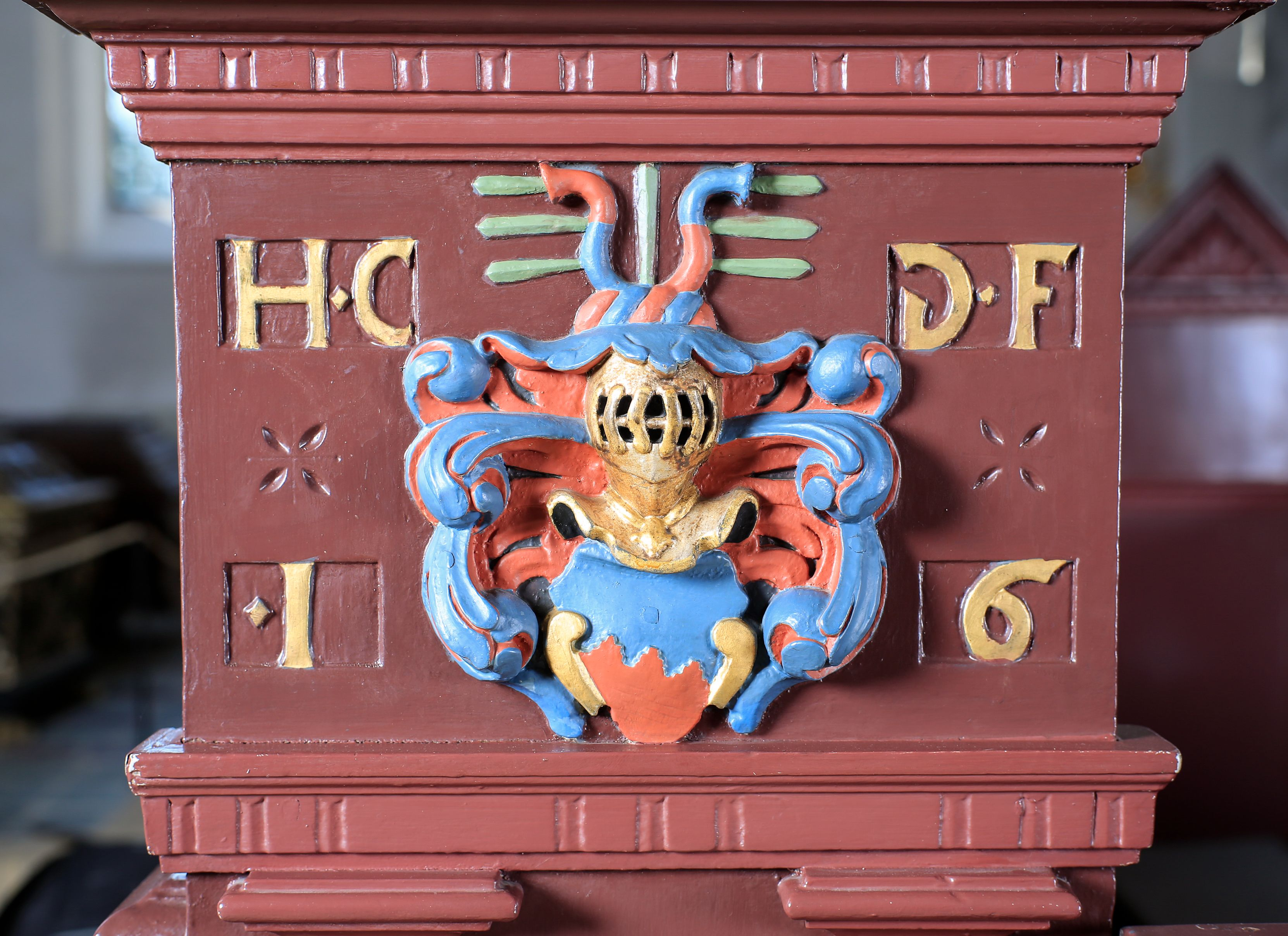
Daa's coat of arms in Fraugde Church on Funen.

Daa was a major landowner. He owned Borreby, Ravnstrup and Holmegaard on Zealand, Fravgdegaard on Funen and Bonderup in Jutland. He constructed a new main building at Holmegaard in 1635.

In 1606, he acquired Skivehus. In 1613, he exchanged Skivehus for Trondhjemgaard in Norway. It was exchanged for Vestervig in 1620 which was then exchanged for Dragsholm in 1624.

== Personal life ==
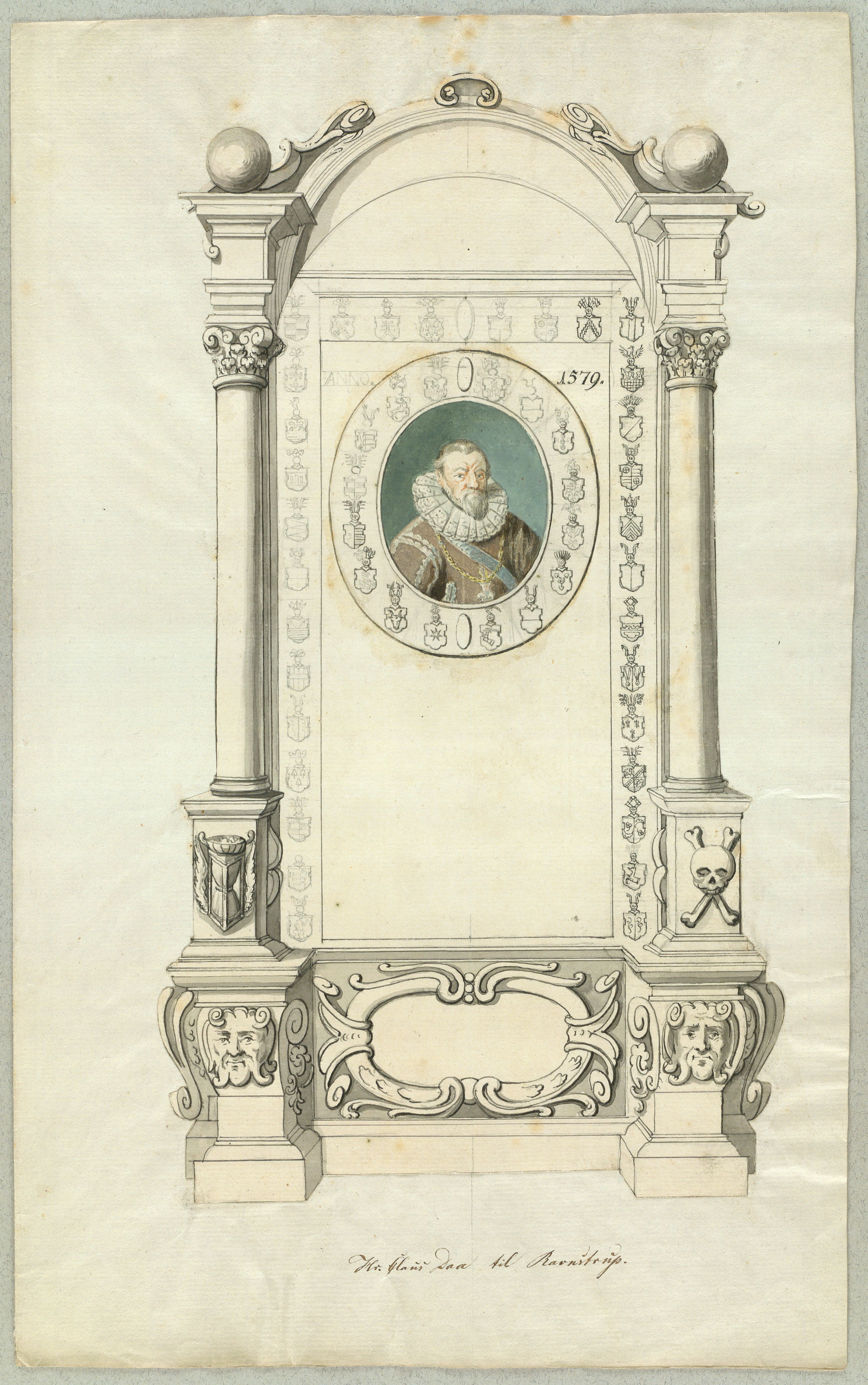
Drawing by Søren Abildgaard of epitaphium to Claus Daa and his two wives in Herlufsmagle KChurch.

He married Dorthe Henriksdatter Below (1588–1609) on 22 April 1604. After her death, he then married Ingeborg Valdemarsdatter Parsberg (1592–1641) on 2 May 1613.

He had 11 children:

- Dorte Clausdatter Daa (1 March 1614, Trondheimgård – 19 December 1616, Trondheimgård) (Age 2 år)
- Claus Daa, (born 1615)
- Valdemar Daa (15 May 1616, Trondheimgård – 15 February 1691, Viborg)
- Dorte Clausdatter Daa (14 July 1617, Trondheim – 28 May 1675)
- Hilleborg Clausdatter Daa (21 December 1618, Trondheimgård – 7 February 1662, Espe)
  - married N.N. Daa (30 January 1620, Borreby – 30 January 1620, Borreby Slot)
- Christian Daa (30 January 1620 – 20 February 1620)
- Ide Clausdatter Daa (24 November 1622, Lerkenfeldt Gods – 5 April 1668, Marsvinholm Slott)
- Christian Daa (c. 1623–1673)
- Jørgen Daa (1624–30 Jun 1652, Assens)
- Beate Clausdatter Daa (2 April 1625, Dragsholm Slot – died after 1672)
