= Maase (noble family) =

Von der Maase
- Noble family
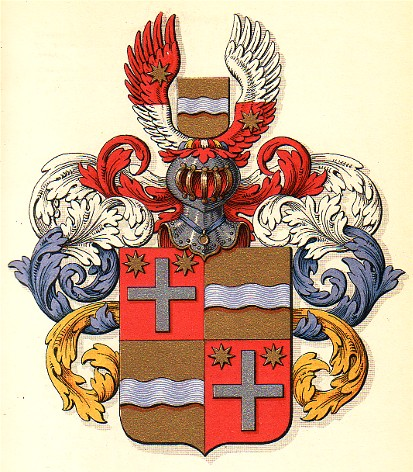
- Country: Denmark
- Founded: 1712

The Maase family or von der Maase is a Danish noble family of German origin. The family descended from the German theologian and landowner Hector Gottfried Masius, whose children were ennobled by letters patent in 1712.

== History ==
Hector Gottfried Masius was born in Mecklenburg and came to Copenhagen where he served as court preacher and professor. He achieved great wealth through his marriages to Birgitte Magdalene Engberg and acquired a number of large estates on the southern part of Zealand. His children were ennobled by letters patent with the name von der Maase in 1712.

=== Rostgaard von der Maase ===
Major Frederik Masius von der Maase (1696-1728), a son of Hector Gottfried Masius by his second wife, married Conradine Sophie Rostgaard (1704-1758), the daughter Frederik Rostgaard and granddaughter of Hans Rostgaard, thereby founding a branch of the von der Maase family that uses the name Rostgaard von der Maase.

Frederik Masius von der Maase (1696-1728) owned Tybjerggaard and Førslevgaard and acquired Stamhuset Kragerup with Krogerup Manor as well as most of the island of Anholt through his marriage.

== Property ==
Members of the family have owned a number of large estates and manor houses. These include Ravnstrup, Gunderslevholm, Førslev, Fuglebjerg, Lundbygård and Farumgård. Members of the family have also owned most of the island of Anholt since the 1820s.

== Notable family members ==
- Frederik von der Maase (1724–1774), officer, landowner and chamberlain
- Frederik Anthon Adam von der Maase (1773–1821), courtier and landowner
- Frederik Herman Rostgaard von der Maase (1800–1866), courtier
- Frederik Christian Rostgaard von der Maase (1825 –1905)
- Hans von der Maase (born 1946), physician and professor
- Jens Christian Rostgaard von der Maase (born 1949), lawyer
