= Hector Gottfried Masius =

German-Danish Lutheran theologian

Hector Gottfried Masius (13 April 1653 – 20 September 1709) was a German Lutheran theologian serving as vice-chancellor of the University of Copenhagen from 1691 to 1692 and, again, from 1700 to 1701. He acquired wealth through marriages and owned a number of estates. His children were ennobled in 1712 with the surname von der Maase.

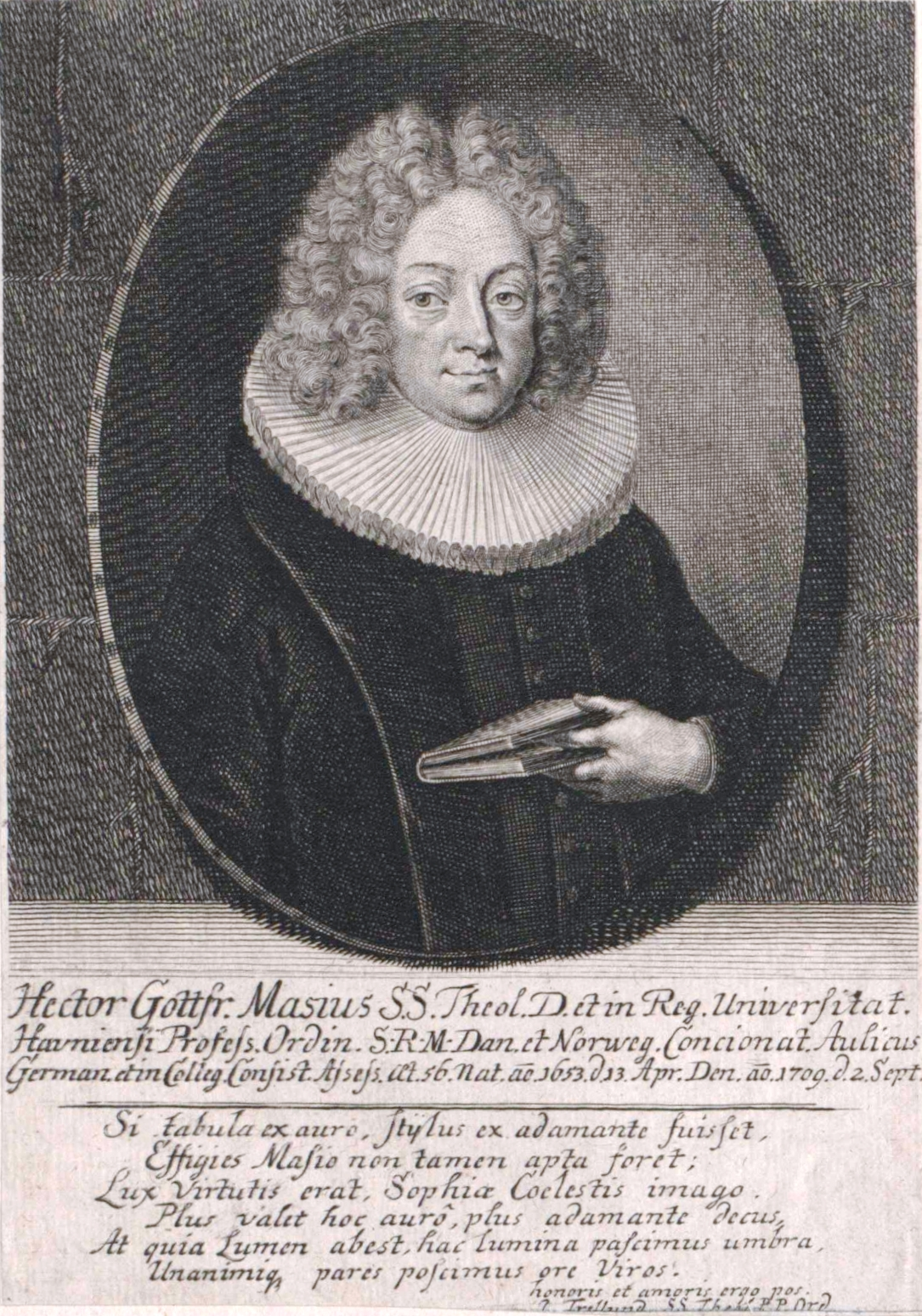
Hector Gottfried Masius

== Early life and education ==
Masius was born in Schlagsdorf in Mecklenburg. He went to school in Lübeck. In c. 1668, he came to Giessen where he obtained a theology degree in 1675. He later continued his studies in Strasbourg, Tübingen and Basel where he studied Hebrew under Johannes Buxtorf. He then went on to Leiden and Utrecht.

== Career in Danish service ==
Moving to Copenhagen, he won the favour of Grand Chancellor Frederik Ahlefeldt who arranged for him to give private lectures at the University of Copenhagen. In 1682, he was promised the next vacant professorship in theology. In 1682, Masius accompanied diplomat Henning Meyercrone to France where he served as chaplain to the Danish embassy in Paris until 1687. He published Defense de la religion luthérienne in 1685. After a short visit to Oxford, he was called back to Copenhagen and was made a professor of theology at the University of Copenhagen.

== Personal life and property ==
Masius obtained great wealth through his two marriages. In 1692, he married Birgitte Magdalene Engberg (1677-1694). In 1695, he married Anna Catharine Dröge (1661-1705). He owned the estates Ravnstrup, Gunderslevholm, Førslevgaard, Fuglebjerggaard and Lundbygård. He died during 1709 at Ravnstrup and was buried at Gunderslev Church (Gunderslev Kirke) His children were ennobled in 1712 with the surname von der Maase.

== Written works ==
- Defense de la religion lutherienne contre les docteurs de l'Eglise romaine. Où on fait voir en même temps leurs erreurs fondamentales. Pour l'usage de ceux de la veritable religion, qui sejournent en France. Frankfurt 1685 (= Verthaidigung der Evangelisch-Lutherischen Religion, wider die Römisch-Catholische Lehrer, da zugleich Deroselben Grundstürtzende Irrthümme kürtzlich angezeiget, und gründlich widerleget werden, Frankfurt 1685).
- De existentia daemonis, quatenus e naturae lumine innotescit. Kopenhagen 1682.
- Theologiæ Polemicæ Summa : In gratiam Studiosæ Juventutis XL. Disputationibus comprehensa Et In Collegio Privato ad ventilandum proposita: Kopenhagen 1687.
- Interesse Principum circa religionem Evangelicam. Kopenhagen 1687.
- Schediasma historico-philologicum de diis Obotritis seu idolis Mecklenburgensium et praecipue de Radegasto. Accessit dissertatio ejusdem de existentia daemonis, cum notis Andreae Borrichii. Kopenhagen 1688.
- Das Treue Lutherthumb, entgegengesetzet der Schule Calvini, Womit des Vermummeten Huberti Mosani Bericht von der Weltlichen Obrigkeit, so er gegen Masii Interesse principum neulich herausgegeben widerleget. 1690
- Kurtzer Bericht von Dem Unterscheid Der wahren Evangelischen Lutherischen/ und der Reformirten Lehre/ Nebst einem Anhang/ und Erörterung folgender Fragen: I. Ob zwischen den Lutheranern und Reformirten eine Religions Einigkeit und Brüderschafft zu hoffen? II. Ob nicht die Reformirten Gewissens halber verbunden seynd Krafft ihrer eigenen Lehr-Sätze/ zu uns zu treten. 1690, neuer Abdruck Gütersloh 1880 (Digitalisat, ULB Münster)
- Erinnerungs-Schreiben An Hubertum Mosanum, Wie er die Sache angreiffen müsse, wo er Doct. Masij Treues Lutherthum beantworten wolle : sampt Huberti Mosani Antwort. Franckfurt an der Oder 1691.
- Antiquitatum Mecklenburgensium schediasma historico-philologicum. Kopenhagen 1691.
- Der Abgefertigte Jesuit In Franckreich Oder Schrifftmäßige Widerlegung Päbstlicher Lehre In dreyen Puncten : I. Von der Messe II. Von der Kirchen Folge III. Von dem rechtmässigen Beruff der Evangelischen Prediger. 1695.
- Heilige Passions-Gedancken, oder Kurtze Betrachtung des Bluts Christi, so da besser redet als das Blut Abels : Hiebevor in einigen Passions-Predigten vorgestellet. Kopenhagen 1700.
- Dissertationes academicae, in II tomos distributae quorum : I. Dogmatico-historico-polemicas; II. Exegetico-dogmaticas continet, cum appendice orationum. Hamburg 1719.

Academic offices
Preceded by Holger Jacobæus	Rector of University of Copenhagen; 1691–1692	Succeeded by Caspar Bartholin the Younger
Preceded by Ole Rømer	Rector of University of Copenhagen; 1700–1701	Succeeded by Caspar Bartholin the Younger
