= Prince William Mansion, Copenhagen =

Historic property in central Copenhagen, Denmark

Prince William Mansion
- Prins Wilhelms Palæ
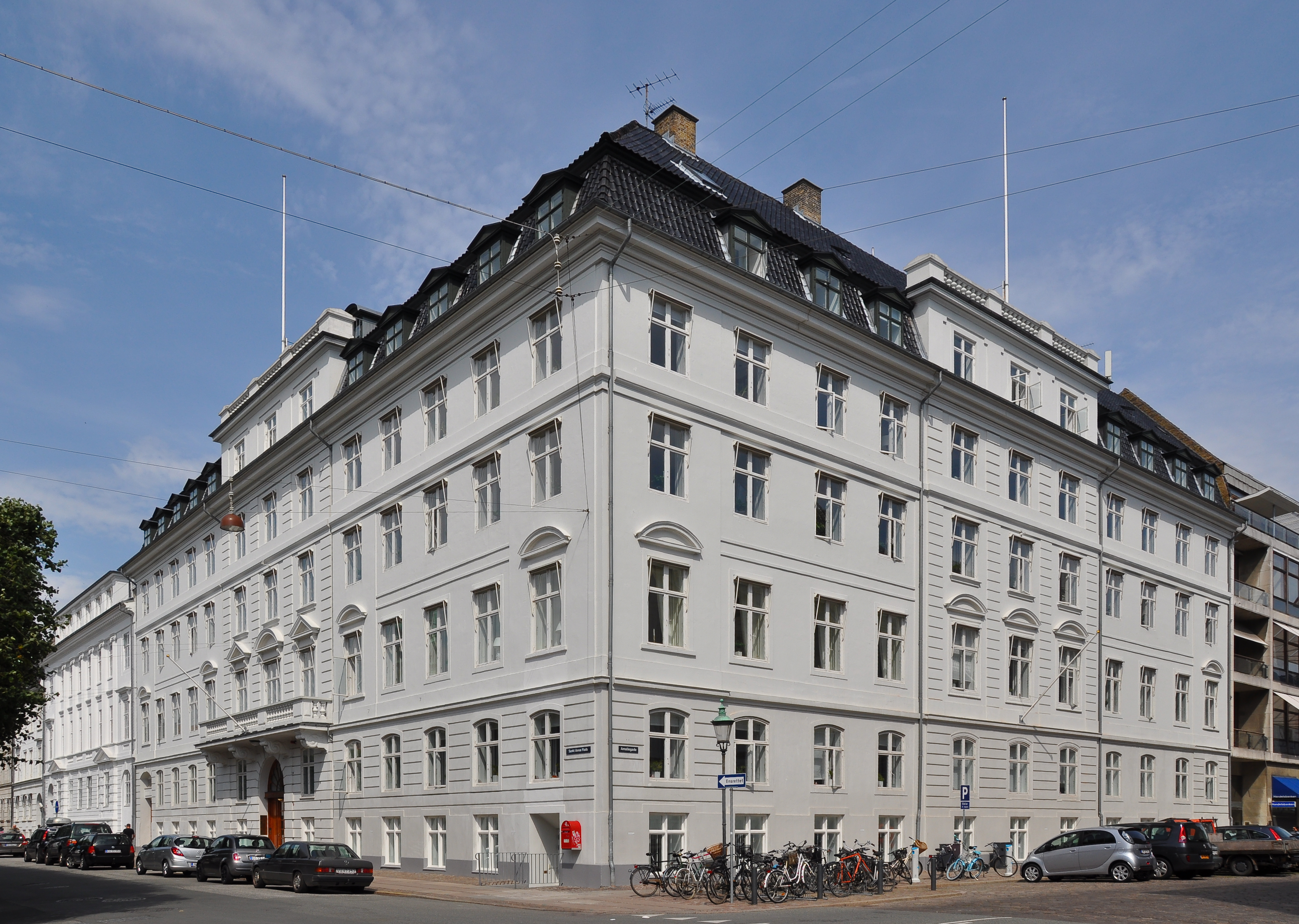
- The mansion seen from Sankt Annæ Plads
- Interactive map of the Prince William Mansion area

General information
- Architectural style: Rococo
- Location: Frederiksstaden, Copenhagen, Denmark
- Coordinates: 55°40′54.76″N 12°35′27.24″E
- Construction started: 1749
- Completed: 1751
- Client: Wilhelm August von der Osten
- Owner: Jeudan

The Prince Wilhelm Mansion (Danish: Prins Wilhelms Palæ) is a historic property on the corner of Sankt Annæ Plads and Amaliegade in central Copenhagen, Denmark. It is owned by the property investment company Jeudan which is headquartered in the building.

== History ==
=== 18th century ===
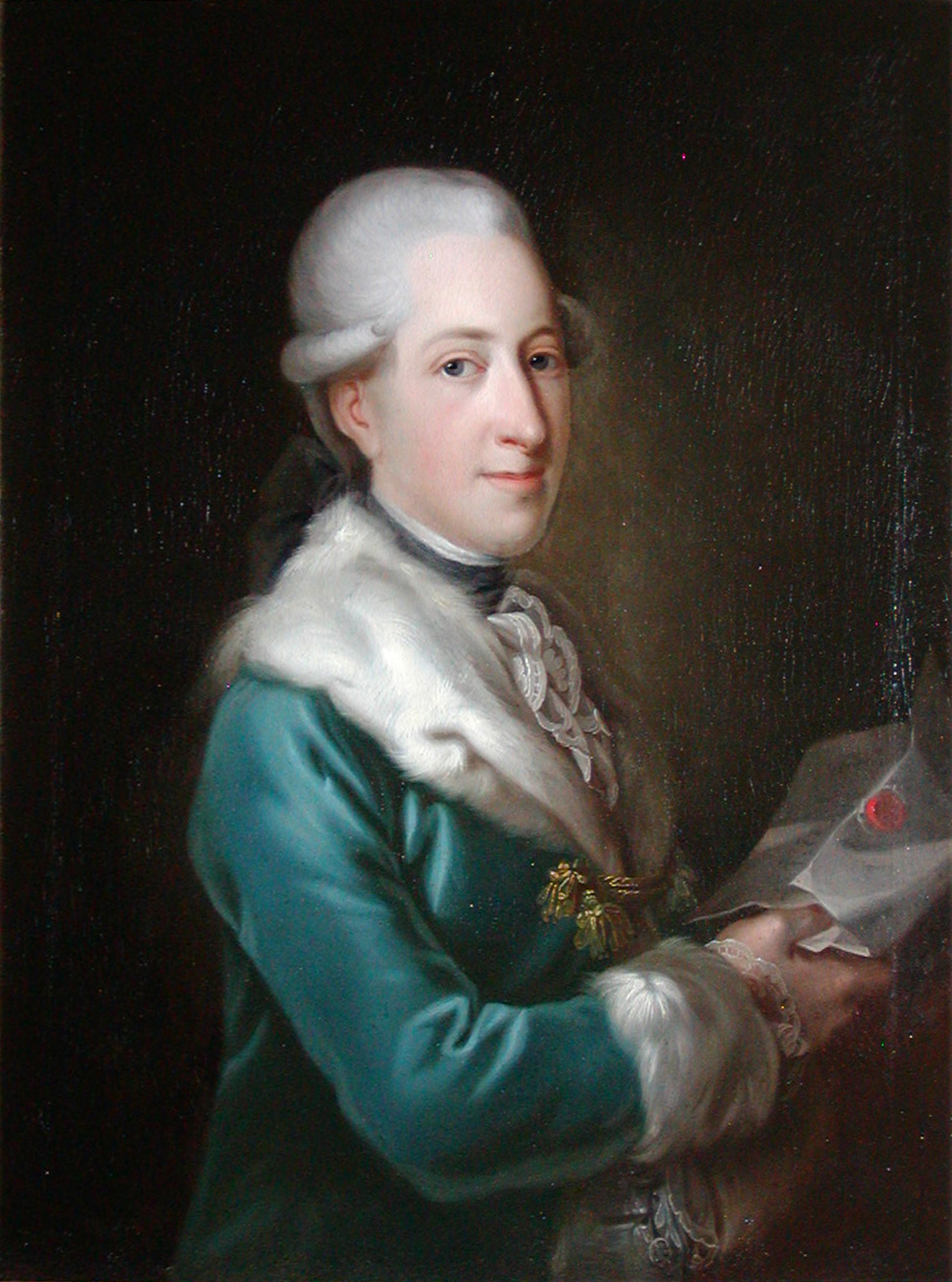
Charles August Selby, the owner from 1794 to 1804

The mansion was built from 1749 to 1752 for Wilhelm August von der Osten. It was located in the former grounds of Sophie Amalienborg which were now up for redevelopment into the new district Frederiksstaden.

Robert Tuite (1746–1811), a plantation owner from Saint Croix in the Danish West Indies, purchased the building in 1777. He also acquired the Andreas Bjørn House and an associated sugar refinery, Union House, in Christianshavn. He married Mary Ann (-1807), the widow of Robert Cotton Trefusis. in London in 1780. The couple lived in the mansion on Sankt Annæ Plads but divorced in 1787 and Tuite moved back to Saint Croiz in 1792. Charles August Selby, Tuite 's cousin and business partner, purchased the building in 1794. Selby had previously lived at Strandgade 24 in Christianshavn.

=== 19th century ===
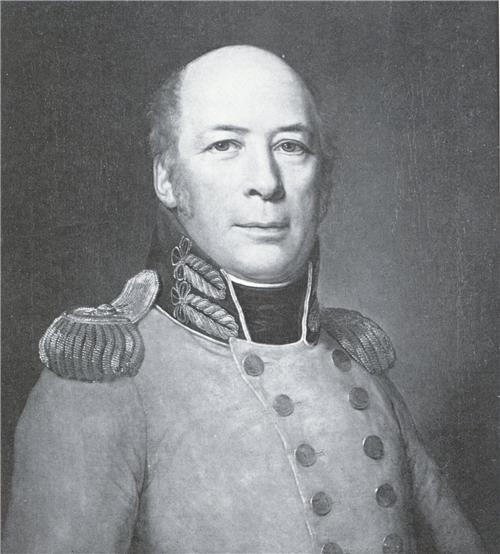
Peter Lotharius Oxholm, the owner from 1808

In 1804, Selby sold the mansion to Imperial Roman Vice consul Johan Nicolai Adam Romeis. In 1808, he sold it to Major-General Peter Lotharius Oxholm, He was the owner of several plantations on Saint Croix and served as Governor-General of the Danish West Indies from 1814 to 1816.

In 1826, the mansion was acquired by King Frederick VI who put it at the disposal of Prince William of Hesse-Kassel. He lived there until his death in 1867.

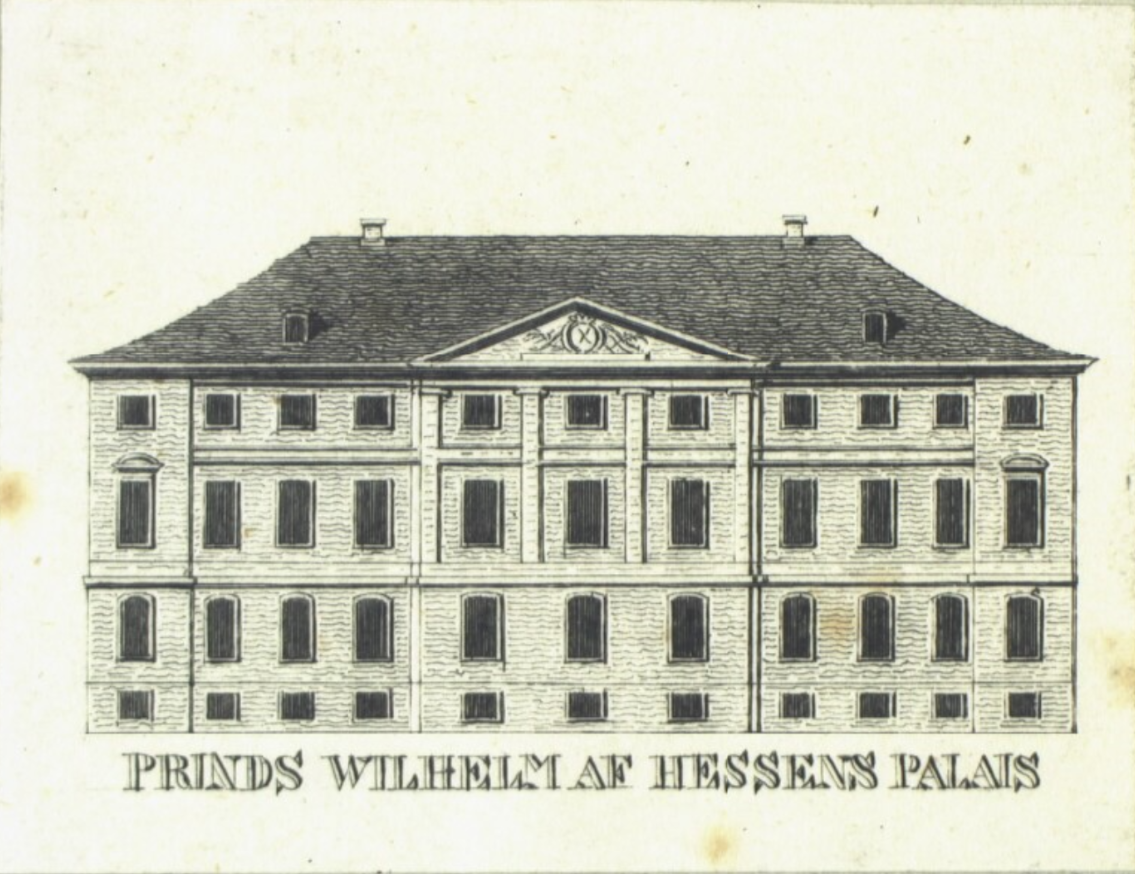
Prinds Wilhelm af Hessens Palais

After that, the building came to new use. The Nobel Prize-winning medical doctor Niels Finsen for a while lived in the building as a young student and is now commemorated with a plaque on the building's facade. In 1878, it was acquired by a restaurateur, Lars Larsen, who ran it an event venue under the name Larsens Lokaler. He later changed the name back to Prins Wilhelms Palæ which gave rise to the popular name Prins Larsens Palæ. The Medical Society for Women (Danish: Kvindelig Læseforening) was founded in the building's great hall on 28 November 1907.

=== 20th century ===
In the 1920s, the building came to serve as headquarters for the oil company Det Danske Petroleums Aktieselskab (later Danish Esso) and later Statoil's activities in Denmark.

== Today ==
The building is now owned by the property company Jeudan.

== See also ==
- Lindencrone Mansion
