= Overgaden Oven Vandet 54–56 =

Listed building in Copenhagen

Overgaden oven Vandet 54–56
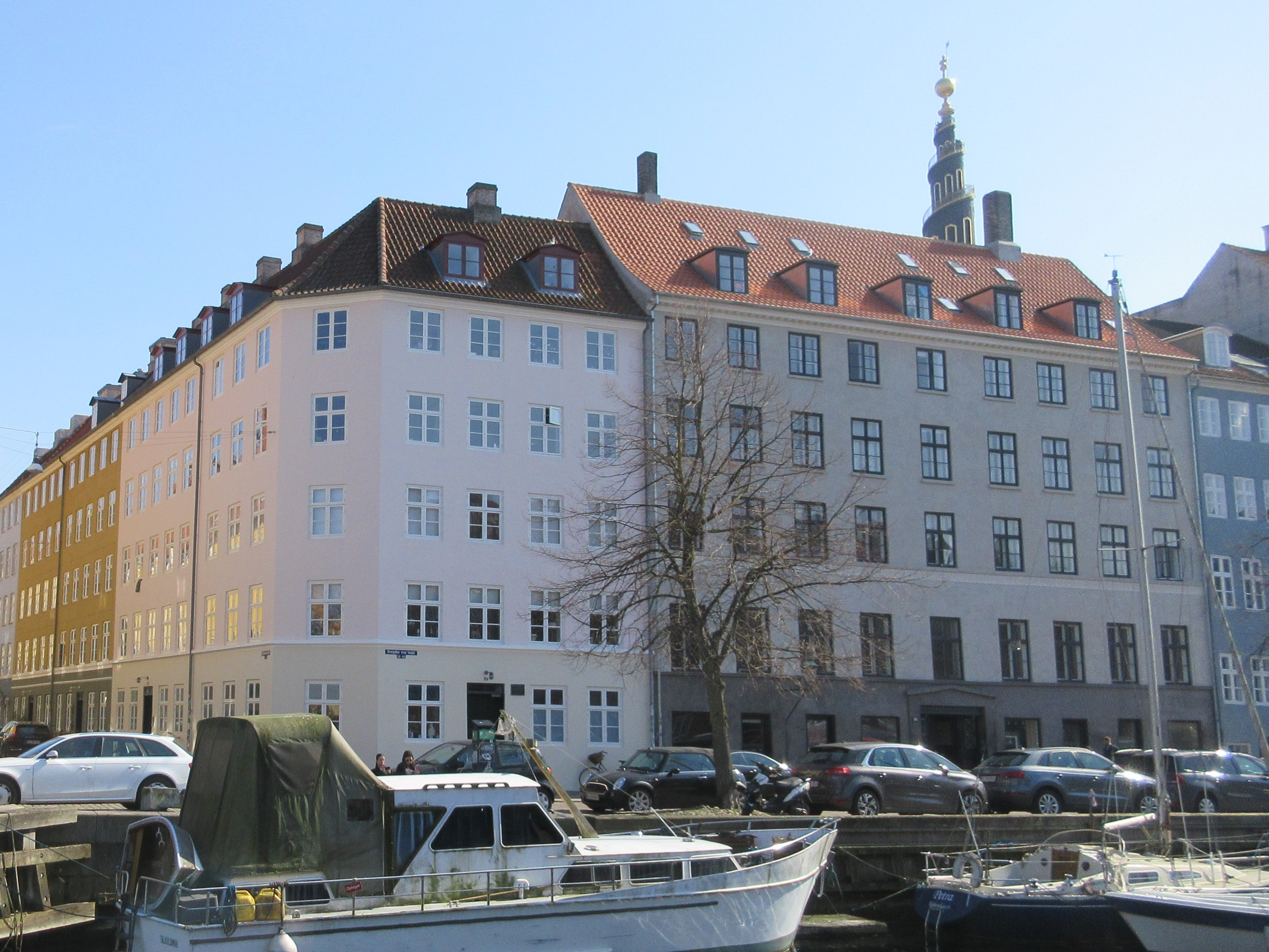
- Overgaden Oven Vamdet 54 (red building) and Overgaden Oven Vamdet 45 (white corner building) in 2018

General information
- Location: Copenhagen, Denmark
- Coordinates: 55°40′26.36″N 12°35′38.11″E
- Completed: 18th century
- Renovated: 1846 (heightened), 1904, 1980s

Overgaden oven Vandet 54–56 is a complex of Late Neoclassical buildings situated at the corner of Overgaden Oven Vandet and Bådsmandsstræde, adjacent to Søkvæsthuset, in the Christianshavn neighborhood of central Copenhagen, Denmark. The two buildings originate in a two-storey bourgeois townhouse from the first half of the 18th century but were both heightened to five storeys by silk hat manufacturer and developer H.P. Lorentzen in the 1840s. The two buildings were individually listed in the Danish registry of protected buildings and places in 1945.

== History ==
=== 17th and early 18th century ===
The site was originally part of a large lot owned by the crown. In 1641, it was ceded to Peder Gregersen. The property was listed as No. 96 in Christianshavn Quarter in Copenhagen's first cadastre of 1689 and was at that time owned by Hans Nansen the Younger (1635-1713). He was active in trade in Iceland. On 27 December 1670, he was appointed as member of Kommercekollegiet. In 1671, he was also appointed as a member of Admiralitetskollegiet. In 1688, he was appointed as the president of Copenhagen.

The large property continued all the way to Bådsmandstsræde in the northeast and Dronningensgade in the southeast. It is unclear when the first buildings were constructed, but an old glass manufactory is mentioned in 1708, and the property was home to a family of four people before the Copenhagen Fire of 1728. They were joined by nine families with a total of 53 family members who had been left homeless by the devastating fire on the other side of the harbour.

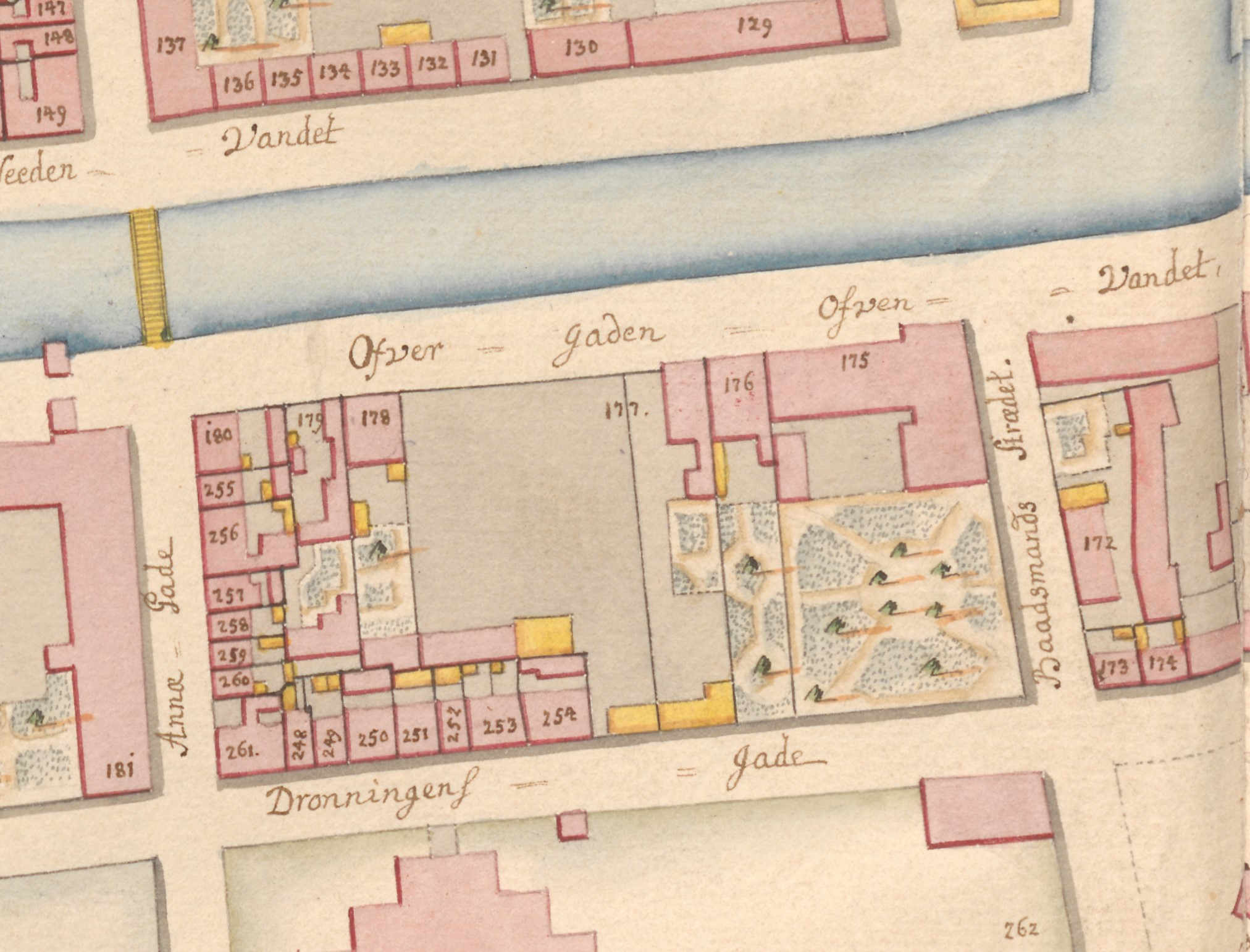
No. 175 seen in a detail from Christian Gedde's map of Christianshavn Quarter, 1757

The first description of the building is from 1745. The main wing along the Canal Street was constructed in brick with one storey over a walk-out basement. The facade was crowned by a three-bay gabled wall dormer. A two-storey secondary wing extended along Bådsmandstræsde and was followed by an eight-bays-long, one-storey, half-timbered building. On the other side of the courtyard was a five-bays-long and two-storeys-high half-timbered side wing. A garden with fruit trees, other plants, statues, and a pavilion is also described in connection with the sale. The building may at some point have replaced an earlier timber-framed building.

In 1753, the property was sold to the pastor at the Church of Our Saviour Hans Leming. His property was listed as No. 175 in the new cadastre of 1756.

In 1760, Leming sold the property to the English merchant William Chippendale. He was one of the founders of the nearby Union House sugar refinery. The half-timbered buildings were demolished in 1761. The main wing along the canal was at the same time heightened to two storeys.

In 1766, Niels Halkier (1745-1801) purchased the property. He served as master shipbuilder at the General Trading Company's shipyard from 1760 to 1768 and then as master shipbuilder at Peter Appleby's shipyard.

=== Buntzen family ===
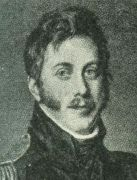
Andreas Buntzen Jr.

The property was later acquired by Anders Buntzen (1733–1810). On 17 June 1772, he was granted citizenship as a merchant (grosserer) in Copenhagen. On 29 December 1774, he married Marie Margrethe Ache (1752–1811). Their household comprised their daughter Anne Bolette Buntzen, their son Andreas Buntzen (1781–1830), the wife's mother Bolette Achem Anne Cathrine Buurmeister, an office clerk in the family's trading firm, a caretaker and two maids at the time of the 1787 census. Andreas Buntzen Jr. was still living with his parents in the building at the 1801 census. His sister had married the military officer Frederik (Friederich) Julius Christian de Saint-Aubain (1754–1819) in 1798 and they were now residing in an apartment at the corner of Torvegade and Strandgade. On 6 April 1800, Buntzen Jr. married Camilla Cécilie Victoire Du Puy (1790–1871). She was a daughter of the composer Edouard Du Puy (c. 1770–1822) and the actress Julie Henriette Pauline Moulineuf (aka Montroze, died 1833).

The family's property was listed as No. 177 in the new cadastre of 1806. Ownership of it passed to Andreas Buntzen Jr. following his father's death in 1810. His home was a lively meeting place for members of the extensive Buntzen family. It was also frequented by some of the prominent cultural figures of the time, including Jens Baggesen, Thomasine Gyllembourg (née Buntzen, his cousin) and Peter Andreas Heiberg. Buntzen's nephew Andreas Nicolai de Saint-Aubain, who published his books under the pseudonym Carl Bernhard, has described life in the building in Et år i København ("One Tear in Copenhagen").

Buntzen's trading firm ran into economic difficulties during the economic crisis that followed the war with England, culminating with its bankruptcy in 1820. He therefore had to sell the property in 1822.

=== 1840 census ===
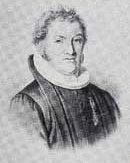
Nicolai Clausen Schack

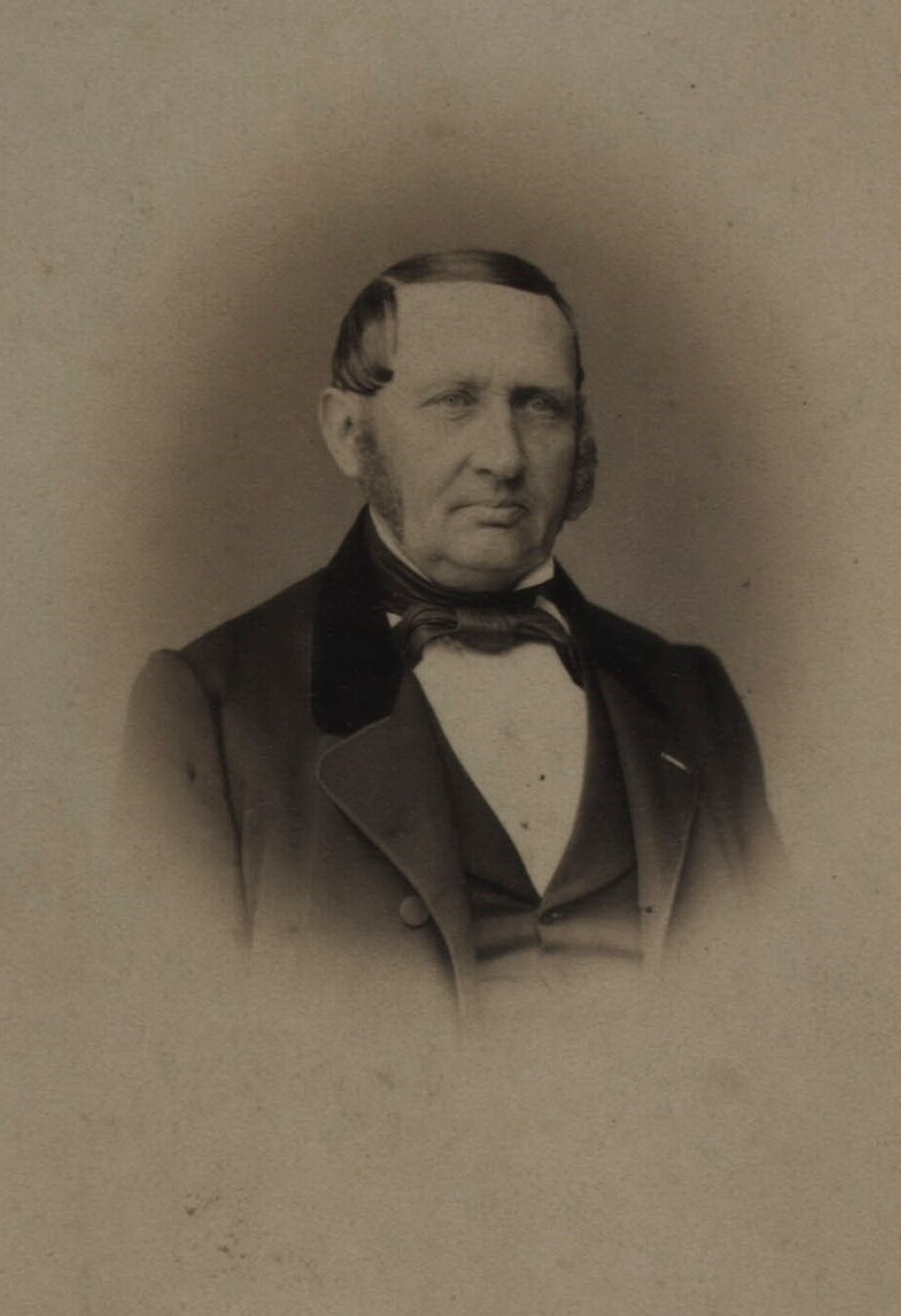
Hans Arreboe Clausen

The property was home to 17 residents in three households at the 1840 census. Nicolai Clausen Schack (1781–1944), pastor of Our Saviour's Church, resided on the first floor with his wife Tagea Dorothea Schack (née Erasmim 1786–1841), three of their children (aged 20 to 24), one male servant and one maid. Hans Arreboe Clausen (1806–1891), a merchant trading on Iceland, resided on the first floor with his wife Asa Sandholdt (1815–1899), their nine-year-old son Holger Peter Clausen, his sister-in-law Madam Høling and her three-year-old daughter, one apprentice and one maid. Peter Christian Abildgaard Holten, an employee at the Hambroske Møller, resided on the ground floor with the seamstress Karen Marie Hansen.

=== H. P. Lorentzen's 1844-46 redevelopment project ===
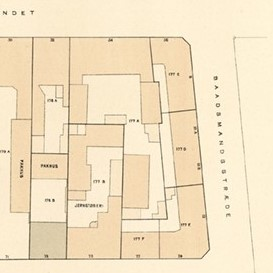
Overgaden Oven Vandet 54 seen in a district plan from 1886

The property was acquired by H.P. Lorentzen in the mid-1840s. He had made a fortune on the production of silk hats and saw a lucrative business opportunity in investing his money in creating new homes for Copenhagen's booming population through densification of old low-density sites. The city had still not been allowed to develop outside its old bastioned fortification ring and new homes for the fast-growing population were therefore in very high demand. Lorentzen's redevelopment plans for the property were therefore aimed at exploiting the site to the utmost. In 1845, No. 177 was divided into No. 177 A (Overgaden Oven Vandet 54) and No. 166B (Dronningensgade 75). In 1846, he heightened the existing building along the canal to five storeys. He also constructed two new side wings, attached to the main wing via two secondary staircases, flanking a central courtyard. In 1846–147, he used a strip of land along Bådsmandsstræde for the construction of four new five-storey apartment buildings. These buildings were converted into separate properties as No. 177 C (Overgaden Oven Vandet 56), No. 177 D (Bådsmandsstræde 10), No. 177 E (Bådsmandsstræde 12/Dronningensgade 79) and No. 177 F (Dronningensgade 77). No. 177 C contained a corner shop flanked by two apartments on the ground floor and two times two apartments on each of the upper floors.

Lorentzen would later engage in a number of other redevelopment projects, most notably on the east side of Nikolah Plads (seven new apartment buildings) and in Nyboder.

=== 1860 census ===
The property was home to 61 residents at the 1860 census. Niels Jensen Lund, a hotelier, resided on the ground floor with his wife Oline Lund, their two-year-old daughter and one maid. Christian Christensen, a firewood retailer, resided on the ground floor with his wife Hanne Rosine Christensen. Hans Nic. Hoff Bay, an auctioner, resided on the first floor with his wife Severine Andrea Bay, their two daughters (aged 12 and 14) and one maid. Johan Frederik Looft, a helmsman, resided on the first floor with his wife Emma Sophie Looft, their two children (aged one and three) and the wife's sister Augusta Heinrich. Anders Andersen, a former farmer, resided on the second floor with his wife Adelaide Andersen and four children (aged one to six). Ove T. Krarup, a senior clerk in the office of Amager Birk, resided on the second floor with his wife Christiane Krarup, one maid and the lodger Henrik Chr. Berg. Johan P. Rosendahl, a royal customs assistant, resided on the third floor with his wife Elise Marie Rosendahl, their four children (aged 17 to 24), a 10-year-old foster daughter and a lodger (student). Michael Fr. Schrøder, a retired hosier (hosekræmmer), resided on the third floor with his wife Wilhelmine Schrøder, their seven children (aged three to 18) and one lodger. Søren Moritz Høyer, a retired infantry captain, resided on the fourth floor with his wife Martha Marie Høyer and two sons (aged 26 and 40). Peter L. Wamberg, a cantor at the Church of Our Saviour, resided on the fourth floor with his wife Henriette Wamberg and their three children (aged five to 12). Rasmus P. Rasmussen, a cooper, resided in the garret with his wife Frederikke Caroline Rasmussen and their nine-year-old daughter. Søren W. Starup, a carpenter, resided in the garret with his wife Karen Starup (née Rasmussen), their two children (aged three and five) and his mother-in-law Susanne Rasmussen.

The side wing was home to another 25 residents. Ane Christine Michelsen, widow of a master weaver, resided on the ground floor with her seven children (aged 10 to 25). Hans Jacob Jacobsen, a warehouse worker, resided on another floor with his wife Ane Marie Jacobsen and their four children (aged three to 12). Hans Christian Poulsen, a prison guard, resided on a third floor with his wife Lovise Poulsen and their three children (aged seven to 13). Marie Kirst. Henriksen, a woman retailer, resided in the side wing with her 12-year-old daughter.

=== 1880 census ===
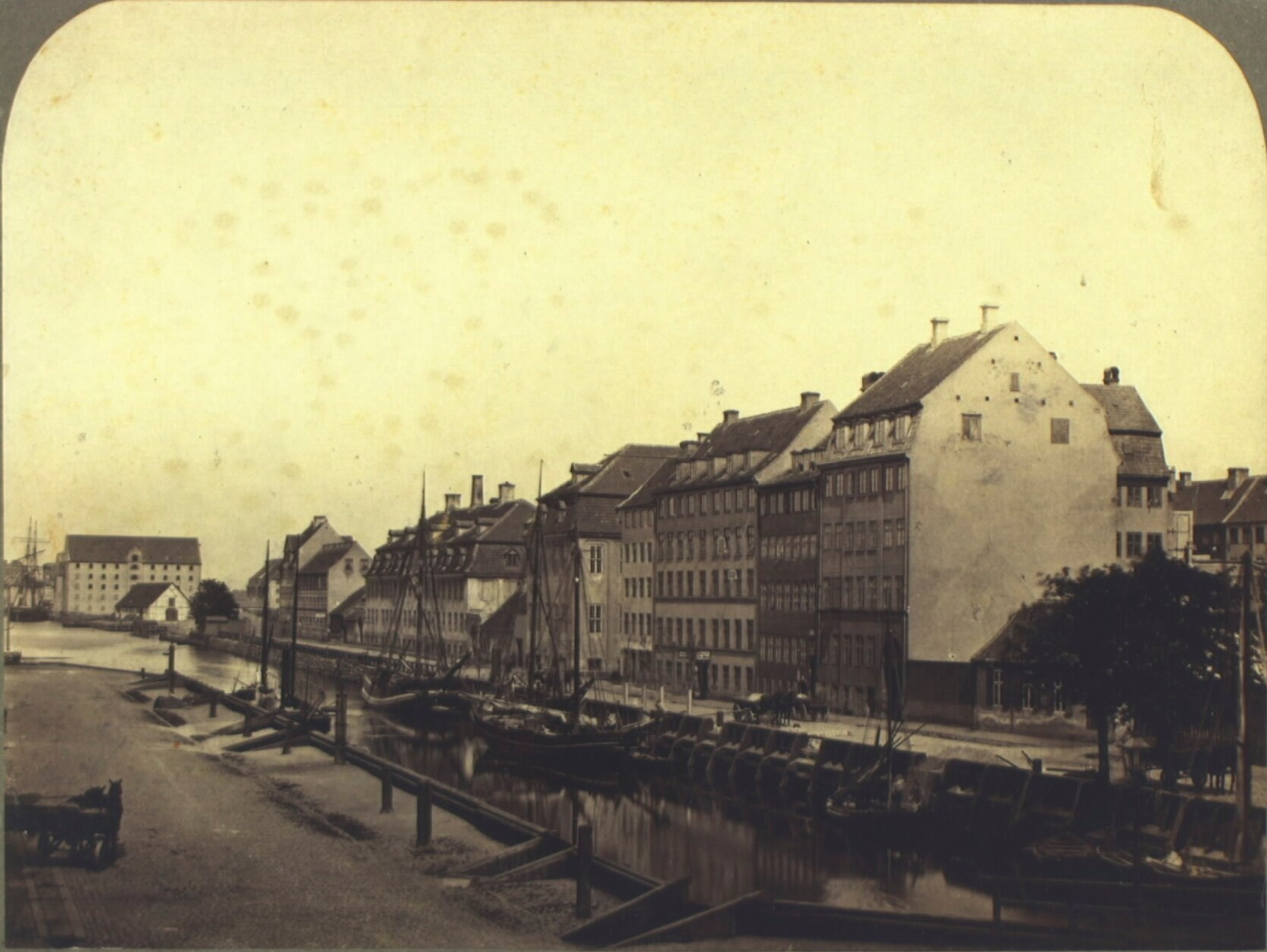
The site in 1975. The building with the exposed gable in the foreground is No.51.

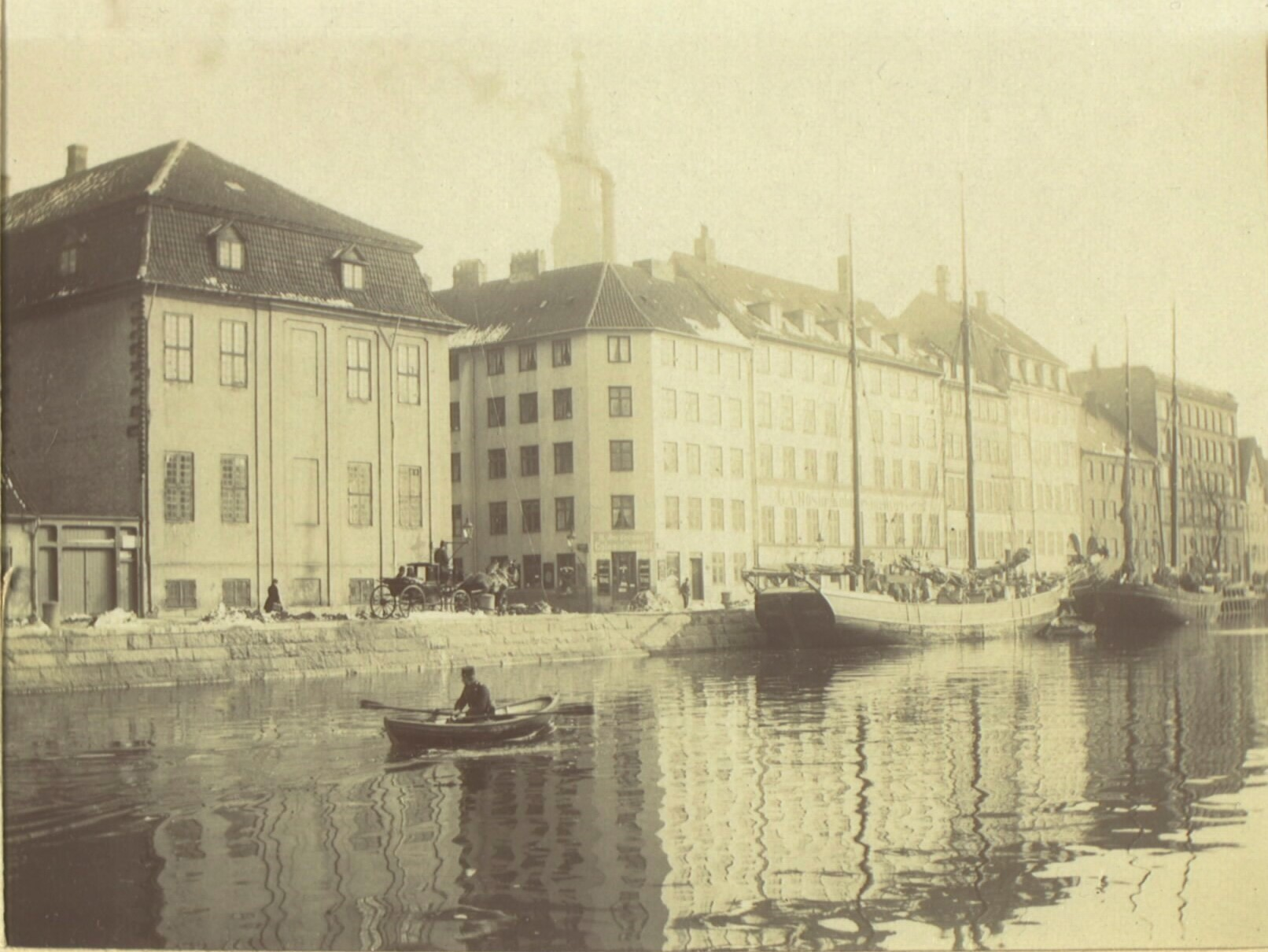
The corner building in the late 19th century. The two display windows flanking the shop entrance can still be seen.

The property was home to 65 residents at the 1880 census. Jacob Peder Jacobsen, a businessman, resided on the first floor with his wife Eleidse Jacobsen, their four children (aged one to 11) and one maid. Peter Christian Sørensen, a cooper, resided on the ground floor with his wife Margrethe Sørensen (née Andersen) and their two children (aged one and three). Jacob Jensen Larsen, a retailer, resided on the ground floor with his wife Johanne Marie Larsen, f. Nielsen, their two children (aged one and three) and one maid. Karen Helene Elise Sørensen, a laundry woman, resided on the ground floor with one maid. Julius Villiam Olsen, a blacksmith, resided on the first floor with his wife Augusta Severine Boelsine Olsen and their three children (aged 12 to 22). Ida Mathilde With, widow of civil servant Peter N. With, resided on the second floor with her four children (aged one to 14), a 22-year-old woman and her nephew Henrik Lindemann. Georg Adolph Bosin, a master coppersmith, resided on the first floor with his wife Sophie Frederikke Glies, a 17-year-old coppersmith's apprentice and one maid. Young Harald Dahlstrøm, a machine manufacturer, resided on the third floor with his wife Clara Emilie Dahlstrøm, their four children (aged one to 11) and one maid. One of the children was the later engineering professor Young Harald Dahlstrøm (1878–1928). Johan Henrik Preüss, an artillery sergent, resided in the other third floor apartment. Peter Ludvig Wamberg, a cantor at the Church of Our Lady, resided on the fourth floor with his wife Henriette Louise Wamberg and two children (aged 25 and 28). Sophie Vilhelmine Nielsen, widow of a machine master, resided on the fourth floor with her son Jarl Frederik Nielsen /machinist). Niels Frederik Nielsen, a coppersmith, resided in the garret with his wife Ellen Nielsen /née Sørensdatter). Jens Jensen, a coal worker, resided in the garret with his wife Else Nielsdatter and his 13-year-old stepson Carl Vilhelm Rotkjær.

Jens Christian Groth, a pensioner, resided in one of the apartments on the first floor of the side wing with his wife Dorthea Groth (née Skrøder), their two children (aged 10 and 11) and one lodger. Niels Peter Olsen. a master cooper, resided in the other first floor apartment with his wife Vilhelmine Conradine Olsen. Vilhelmine Sophie Knudsen and Sigrid Nilsdatter, a 60-year-old nurse and a 24-year-old factory worker, resided on the second floor of the wide wing. Carl Vilhelm Lindgren, a cigar manufacturer, resided on the third floor of the side wing with his wife Caroline Vilhelmine Lindgren.

=== 20th century ===
In 1904 the ground floor apartment at Overgaden Oven Vamdet 56 was converted into an extra shop. The ground floor apartment towards Bådsmandsstræde was at the same time incorporated into the corner shop. A grocery shop was still located at the corner in the 1960s. The shop was converted into a residential apartment in connection with a renovations of the building in the 1980s.

== Architecture ==
=== Overgaden Oven Vamdet 54 ===
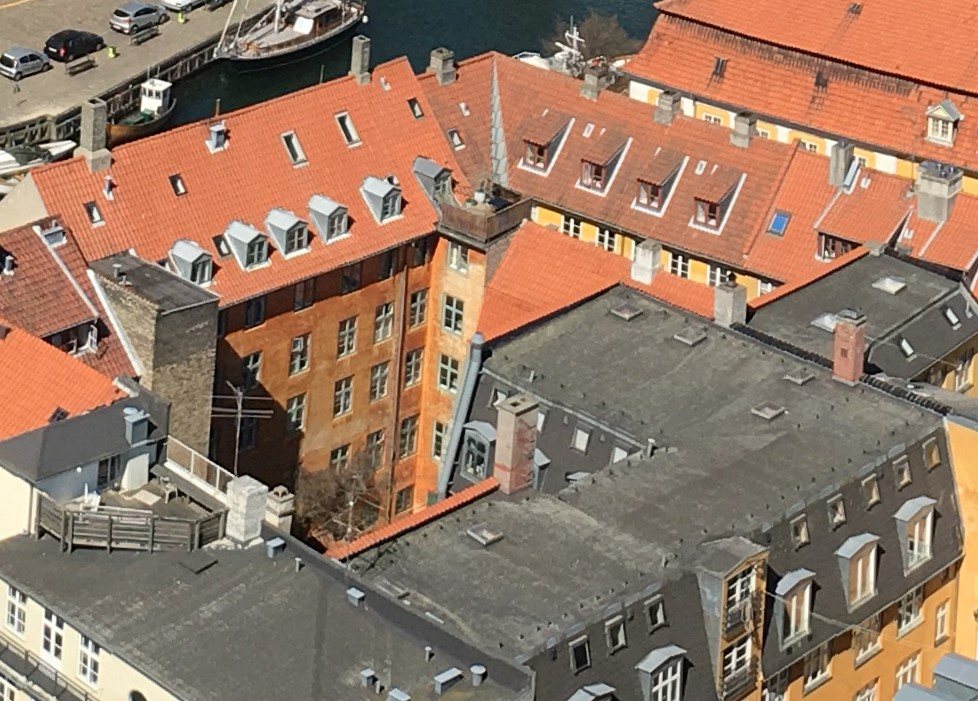
The courtyard side of Overgaden Oven Vamdet 54-56, viewed from the tower of Our Lady's Church

Overgaden Oven Vandet 54 is constructed with five storeys in a plinth of granite ashlars. Two side wings extend from the rear side of the building. They are attached to the main wing via two secondary staircases. The main wing is nine bays wide, of which the central gateway wing is wider than the others. The facade is plastered and red painted with white-painted sill courses below the windows on the first and second floor and a white-painted modillioned cornice. A now red-painted frieze with arcanthus motif runs below the second floor sill course. The tile roof features five dormer windows towards the street. The roof ridge is pierced by two tall chimneys.

=== Overgaden Oven Vamdet 56 ===
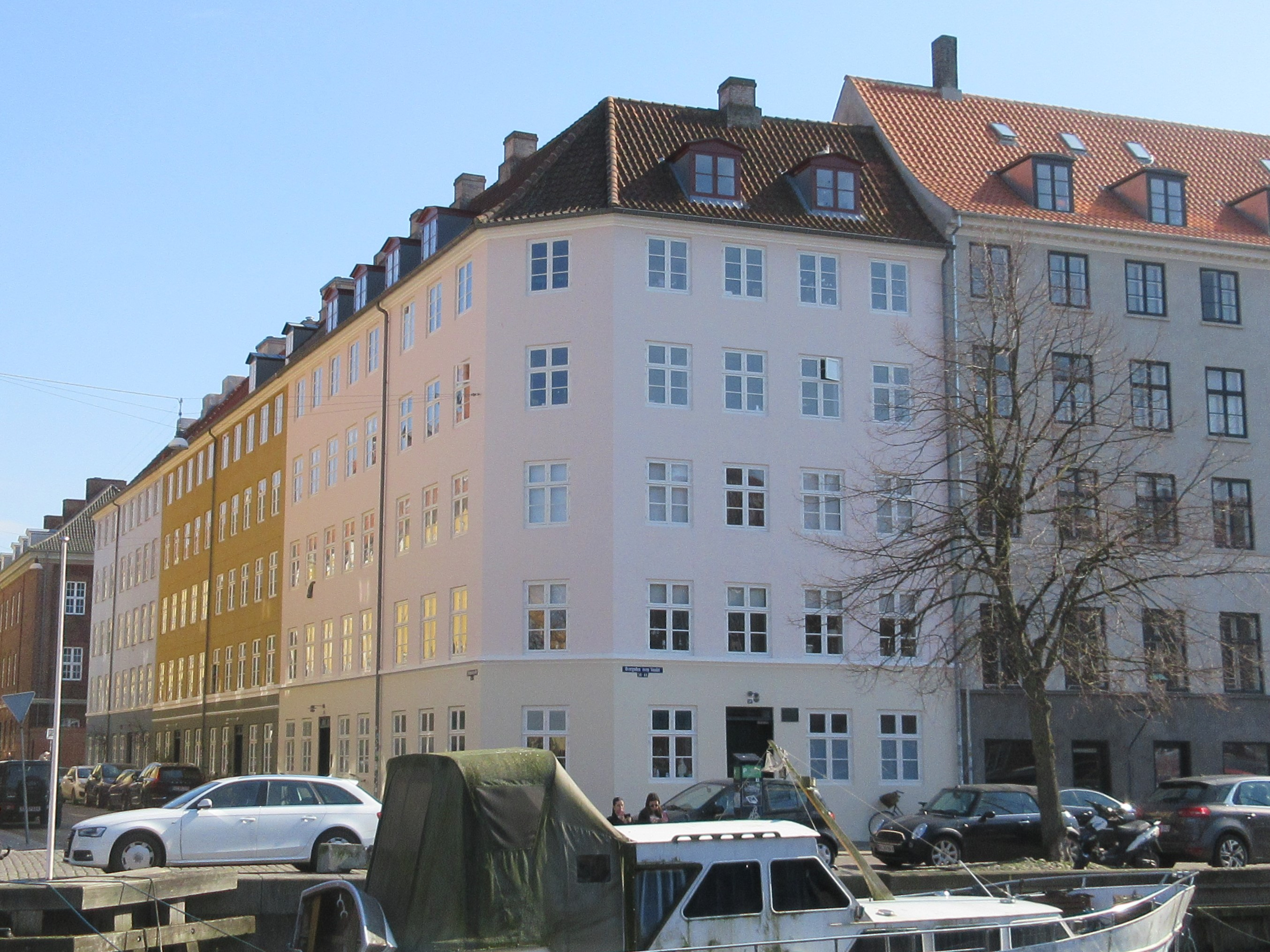
Overgaden Oven Vandet 56 in 2018

Overgaden Oven Camdet 56 is also constructed with five storeys over a walk-out basement. The wing on Overgaden has a faive-bays-long facade on Overgaden, a three-bays long facade on Bådsmandsstræde and a chamfered corner bay. It is followed by a five-bays-long Bådsmandsstræde wing (Nådsmandsstræde 8), whose bays are more narrow than those of the Overgaden wing. The building has a belt course above the ground floor while a frieze similar to that of No. 54 has been removed. The courtyard (or light well) between the building and the northeastern side wing of No. 54 is extremely narrow, testifying to how Lorentzen's 1840s redevelopment of the site made an effort to make the most out of the site.

== Today ==
Overgaden Oven Vamdet 56 is owned by Ejerforeningen Overgaden oven Vandet 54. It contains two shops on the ground floor and two condominiums on each of the upper floors of the front wing. The northeastern side wing contains three more condominiums and the southwestern side wing contains a single condominium.

Overgaden Oven Vamdet 56 is owned by E/F Overgaden Oven Vandet 56. The two times two apartments on each floor were merged into two times one apartment on each floor. The shops in the ground floor have also been converted into residential apartments.

== Commemorative plaque ==
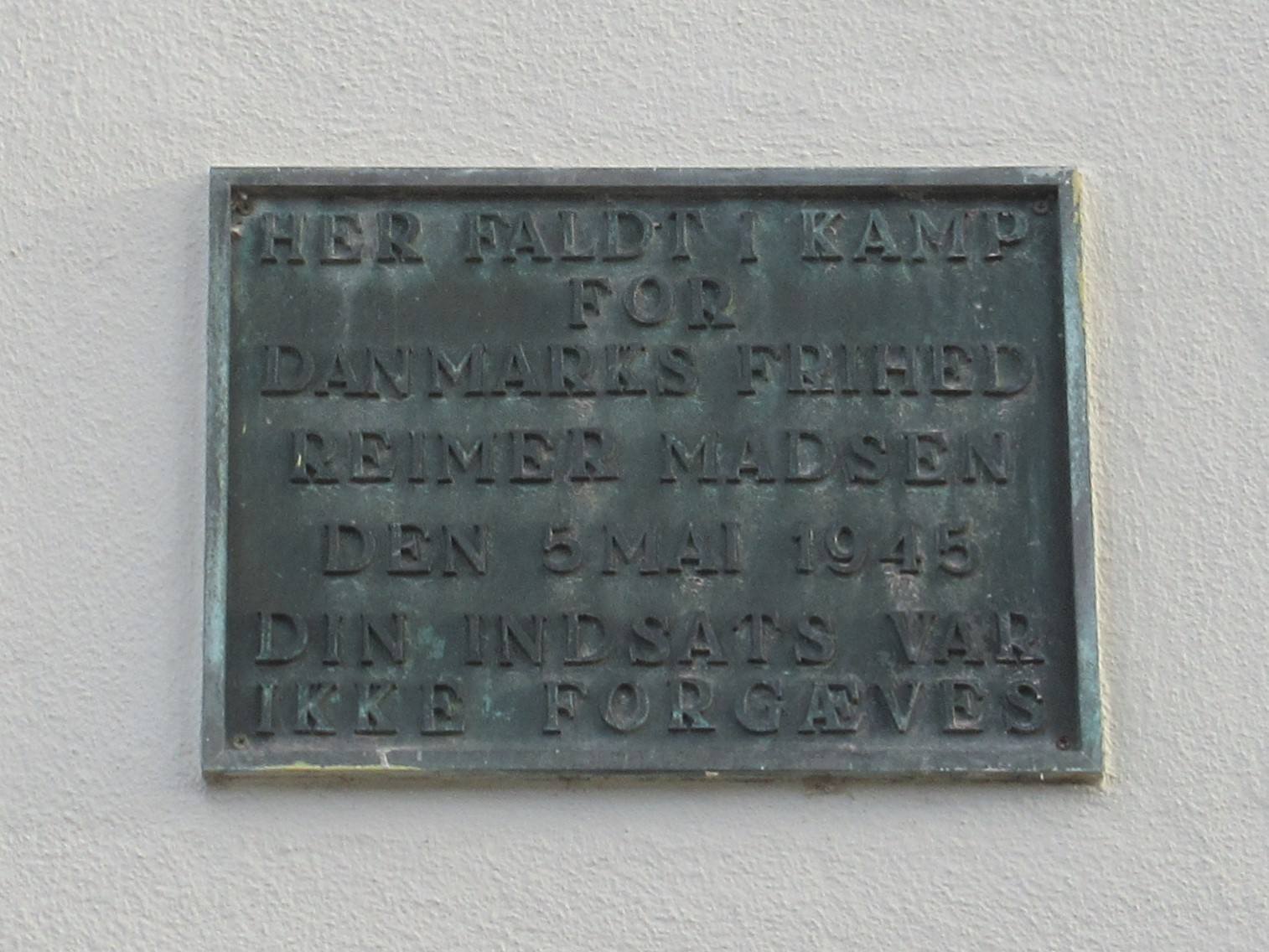
Commemorative plaque

A bronze plaque on the facade of No. 45 commemorates Aksel Hugo Reimer Madsen (1923–1945), a member of the Danish resistance movement, who was killed at the site on 5 May 1945. The inscription reads "Here died in combat / for / Denmark's independence / Reimer Madsen / on 5 May 1945 / your fight was / not in vain".

== Gallery ==
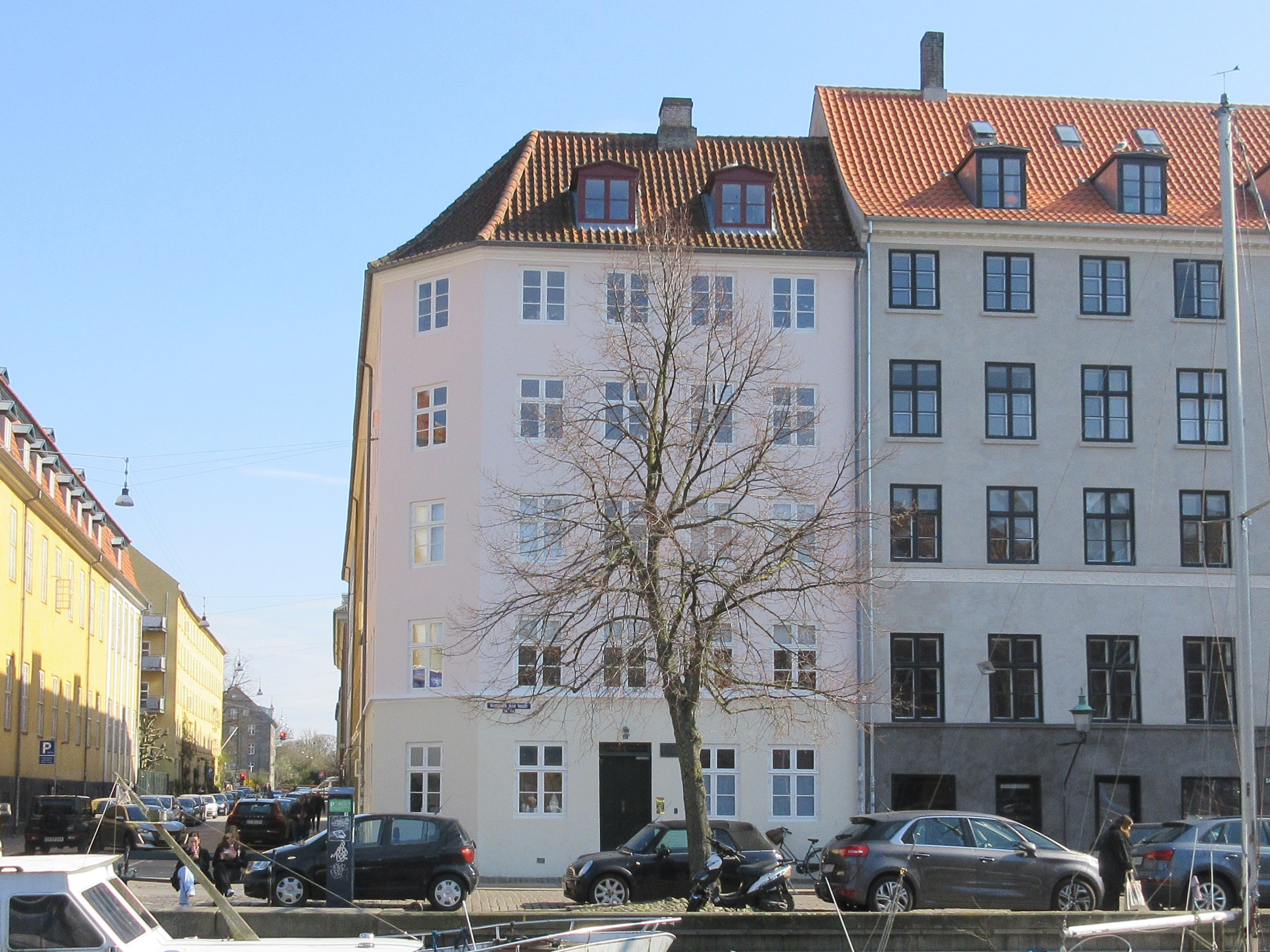
Overgaden Oven Vandet 67, viewed from across the canal

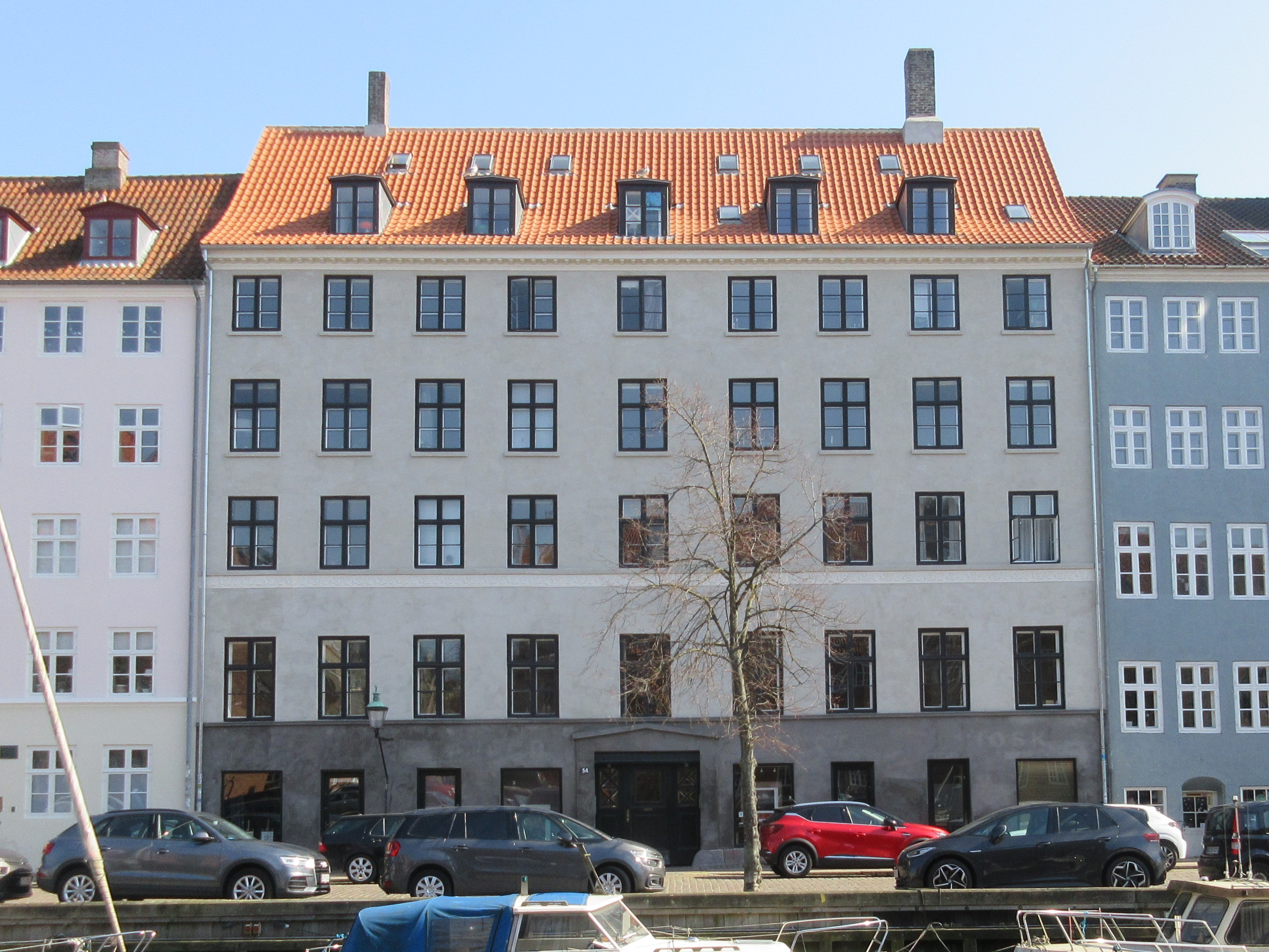
Overgaden Oven Vandet 54
