= William Chippendale =

English merchant

William Chippendale (1730s–1802) was an English merchant who was active in Copenhagen from the late 1750s through the mid-1780s. His firm traded on the Danish West Indies. He owned the Andreas Bjørn House at Strandgade 46 in Copenhagen from 1766 and established the sugar refinery Union House on the property in collaboration with a group of planters from St. Croix in the Danish West Indies.

== Biography ==
Chippendale was born in England, possibly Yorkshire. in the 1730s. He came to Copenhagen in the late 1750s where he purchased the property Overgaden Oven Vandet No. 175 in Christianshavn from the vicar at Church of Our Saviour Hans Lemming (1707–1788).

He sold it to ship builder Niels Halkiær after purchasing the larger Andreas Bjørn House at Strandgade 46. His company traded on the Danish West Indies. He obtained an investment from Nicolas Tuite, a wealthy planter on St. Croux, in return for Tuite's son Robert Tuite and nephew Charles August Selby joining the firm. In 1771, Chippendale, Selby, Tuite and two more planters from St. Croix established the sugar refinery Union House on the property. skipper Peter Ibsen Dahl completed five voyages to the Danish West Indies for Chippendale in the 1770s.

Chippendale bought a property in Gothersgade from Friederich Ludvig Brøer after selling his share of Strandgade 46 to Robert Tuite in 1777. In 1779, Chippendale reacquired the house and sugar refinery in Strandgade from Tuite, now in a partnership with John Duncan.

Chippendale sold his house in Gothersgade to Erich Christian Dan in 1783 and his share of Strandgade 46 to Duncan in 1784, most likely before returning to England.
