= Bredeshave =

Former manor house at Tappernøje, Denmark

- Interactive map of the Bredeshave area

General information
- Location: Strandvejen 11; 4733 Tappernøje, Denmark
- Coordinates: 55°9′20″N 12°0′50″E
- Completed: 1782

Bredeshave is a former manor house located at Tappernøje, Næstved Municipality Denmark. The estate was established as a farm under Bækkeskov in 1786 and granted status of a manor in 1802. Its most notable former owner is Charles August Selby. It is now owned by a foundation and operated as a social institution. All the land has been sold.

== History ==
=== Origins ===
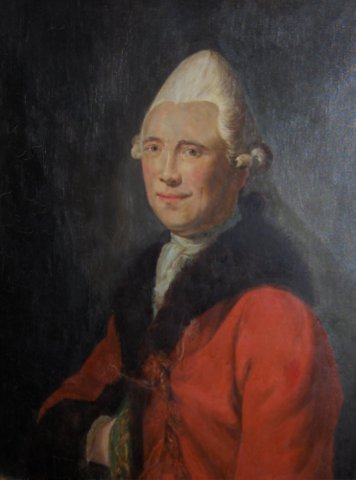
Otto Christopher von Munthe af Morgenstierne

Bredeshave originates in a farm under Bækkeskov. Bredo von Munthe af Mogenstierne had created a garden at the site. It was later passed to his son Otto Christopher von Munthe af Morgenstierne. In 1781, he planted the land with fruit trees. The present main building was constructed for him in 1782. He have it the name naming it renaming it Bredeskov ("Bredo's Forest") in memory of his father. In 1796, Bekkeskov (with Bredeshave) was sold to Charles August Selbye. In 1796, he was ennobled with rank of baron.

=== 18th century ===
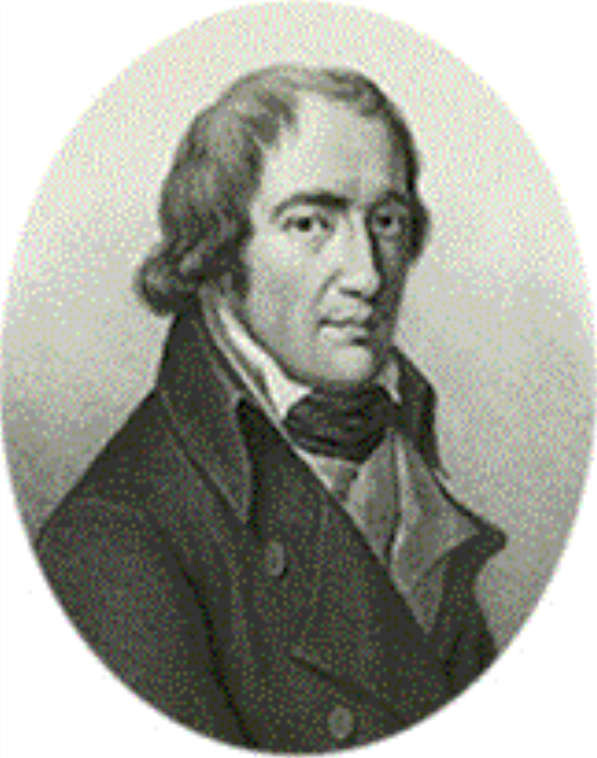
Heinrich Christian Valentiner

In 1802, Bredeshave was sold to Georg Johannes Rubye. At the same time, it was granted status of a manor. In 1805, Rubye sold the estate to Jens Ludvig Christensen- As a consequence of the economic crisis, it then changed hands a number of times over the next one and a half decades.

In 1821, Bredeshave was bought for 44,000 Danish rigsdaler by Heinrich Christian Valentiner. He was originally from Holstein. In 1922, he also purchased Gjeddesdal at Yåstrup hwre he settled with his family. He established his own slaughterhouse at Gjeddesdal, salting the meat and exporting it to France and the Netherlands. From 1828 he also kept dairy cattle and opened a dairy on the estate shortly before his death.

On Valentiner's death, Bredeshave passed to his son C. Ulrik Valentiner. In 1856, he sold Bredeshave to captain P. E. Bjørn.

=== 20th century ===
In 1902, Bredeshave was bought by S.F. Gede. In 1906, he sold the estate to Christian Suenson (1761-1856). His father Jean André Suenson had thus leased Anneberggaard in Odsherred. His wifeMargrete (née Lacoppidan) had been born at Lehnskov. Their first son, who was born at Bredesgave in October 1917, was given the name Jean Nicolai Bredo Lacoppidan Suenson, probably as a reference to the estate's first owner. In 1819, Suenson sold Bredeshave to A.G.C. Jessen. The estate changed hands many time over the next decades.

== Today ==
Bredeshave is now owned by Marjattahjemmenes Støttefond and operated as an institution for people with a mental handicap.og fungerer som en selvstændig institution for udviklingshæmmede.

== List of owners ==
- ( -1796) Otto Christopher von Munthe af Morgenstierne
- (1796-1802) Charles August Selby
- (1802-1805) Georg Johannes Røbye
- (1805-1810) Jens Ludvig Christensen
- (1810) Frederik Raben-Huitfeldt
- (1810-1821) Christen Sørensen
- (1821- ) Henrik Chr. Valentiner
- ( -1836) Chr. Ulrik Valentiner
- (1836-1851) P.E. Bjørn
- (1851-1856) Joachim Nicolai Nohr
- (1856-1860) J.G.H. Gutzon Münster
- (1860-1876) P.G. Münster
- (1876- ) C.E.H. Münster
- (1902-1916) S.F. Gede
- (1916-1919) Chr. Suenson
- (1919-1921) A.G.C. Jessen
- (1921-1924) J. Berntsen
- (1924-1928) E.V. Hoffmann
- (1928-1937) V. Kruse
- (1937- ) P. Fugmann
- (2005- ) Marjattahjemmenes Støttefond
