= Christoffer Godskesen Lindenov =

Christoffer Godskesen Lindenov (c. 1612 – 1679) was a Danish naval officer and landowner. He served as chief of Holmen from 1645 to 1657 with rank of admiral. He was the owner of the estates Lindersvold, Bækkeskov and Store Restrup.

== Early life and education ==
Lindenov was born in circa 1612, the son of Godske Christoffersen Lindenov and Karen Gyldenstjerne. His father had been appointed as chief of Holmen in 1610 but fell ill and died shortly after his son was born. Lindenov studied at Sorø Academy from 1629. In 1635, he was granted an annual royal allowance to train as a naval officer abroad.

== Career ==
In 1645, Lindenov followed in his father's footsteps when he was appointed as chief of Holmen with rank of admiral. Holmen had fallen into disrepair under his predecessor, Erik Ottesen Orning, and bringing it up to date was made difficult by rigshofmesteren Corfitz Ulfeldt's hiring of incompetent and dishonest suppliers. Lindenov secretly briefed Christian IV about the situation through chancellery Secretary Otte Krag but it is not known how the king responded to the accusations.

He commanded a fleet in the Kattegat in 1653 and another one in the Baltic Sea in 1656. After being accused of embezzlement, in February 1657, he was fired and expelled from the court by Frederick III. In February 1658, during the Assault on Copenhagen, he was put in charge of the defence of Christianshavn.

== Property ==
Lindenov inherited Lindersvold after his parents. He purchased Bækkeskov and Store Restrup. He was also granted the fiefs of Helgeland (1646–51) and Utstein kloster (1652–55) in Norway by the king. Shortly after falling out of favor at the court, in 1657, he was granted the fief of Nykøbing Len and kept it until 1661.

== Personal life ==
Lindenov married Dorthe Tønnesdatter Friis (19 March 1624 – 1652) in circa 1646. She was a daughter of Tønne Friis of Hesselager. They had two children, Anne Elisabeth Lindenov (died 1714) and Christian Lindenov (1647-1692).
