= Lindersvold =

Manor house near Faxe, Denmark

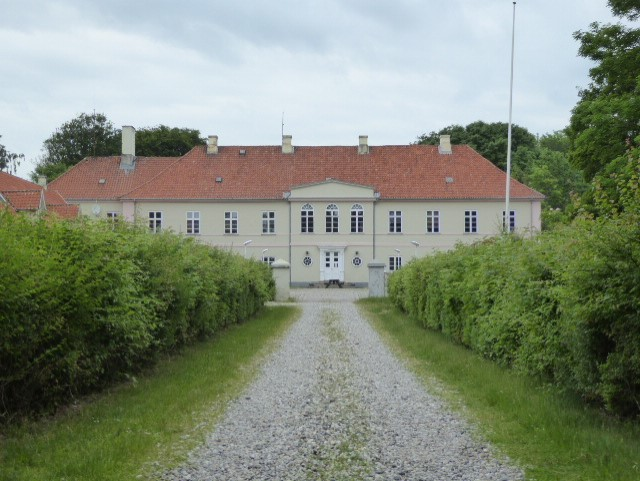
- Interactive map of the Lindersvold area

General information
- Location: Lindersvoldvej 5; 4640 Faxe, Denmark
- Coordinates: 55°11′0.61″N 12°4′44.42″E
- Completed: 1830

Lindersvold is a former manor house and estate located just north of Præstø Fjord, Faxe Municipality, some fifty kilometres south of Copenhagen, Denmark. The estate was founded by Christoffer Lindenov and remained in the hands of the Lindenoc family for almost one hundred years. It was later owned by the Thott/Reedtz-Thott family between 1732 and 1923, from 1705 as part of the Barony of Gavnø. The current main building is from 1830. Lindersvold is now owned by Den selvejende institution Fælleseje and operated as a private primary school for children with special challenges under the name Heldagsskolen Lindersvold.

== History ==
=== 1593–1672: Lindenov family ===
Lindersvold was established by Christoffer Clausen Lindenov (died 1593) and his wife Sophie Hartvigsdatter Pless (died 1602) from land that had until then belonged to the villages of Akselhoved and Hyllingeskov. The estate is first mentioned in 1580. Christoffer Clausen Lindenov was already lensmand of Koldinghus and Hindsgavl and therefore spent little time on his estate at Faxe. It is unclear who owned the estate after Lindenov's death in 1593. Godske Lindenov, who was Admiral and Head of Bremerholm, acquired Lindersvold in 1606. He expanded the estate through the acquisition of more land, for instance the village of Axelhoved with eight farms and eight houses. Lindersvold was after his death passed first to his widow and then to his son. Christoffer Godskesen Lindenov succeeded his father as Head of Bremerholm with rank of Admiral in 1645. In 1657, he fell out of favour at the Court when he was strongly opposed to the war against Sweden. After being accused of embezzlement, in February 1757, he was fired and expelled from the court by Frederick III. In February 1658, during the Assault on Copenhagen, he was put in charge of the defence of Christianshavn. The buildings on the Lindersvold estate were destroyed by Swedish troops during the wars in 1657–58 and 1658–1660. Lindenov constructed a new two-storey, half-timbered main building in 1671.

=== 1672–1732: Urne, von Schildern and Krabbe ===
In 1672, Lindenov sold Lindersvold to his son-in-law, Axel Urne. Just one year later, Urne sold Lindersvold to his brother-in-law, Rabe von Schildern, who was married to Merete Sophie Urne. She managed Lindersvold with great skill after her husband's death in 1680 and for the next 44 years. She also increased the size of the estate through barters or the acquisition of more land.

=== Thott family ===
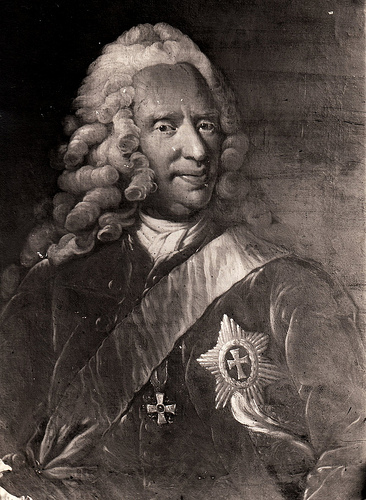
Otto Thott

After Merete Sophie Urne's death, in 1724, Lindersvold passed to her daughter Hedvig Sophie von Schildern Lindersvold. In 1728 she sold it to Kirstine Marie Krabbe, the widow of Ulrik Kruse. Their daughter married Otto Thott. It was later part of Stamhuset Thott-Redtz and the Barony of Gavnø.

The estate was from 1871 to 1897 leased by Ingo Marius Friis. He was a pioneer of cattle breeding in Denmark and in 1884 founded the Association for the Improvement of Cattle Breeding in the Parish of Roholte.

=== Later history, 1923-present ===
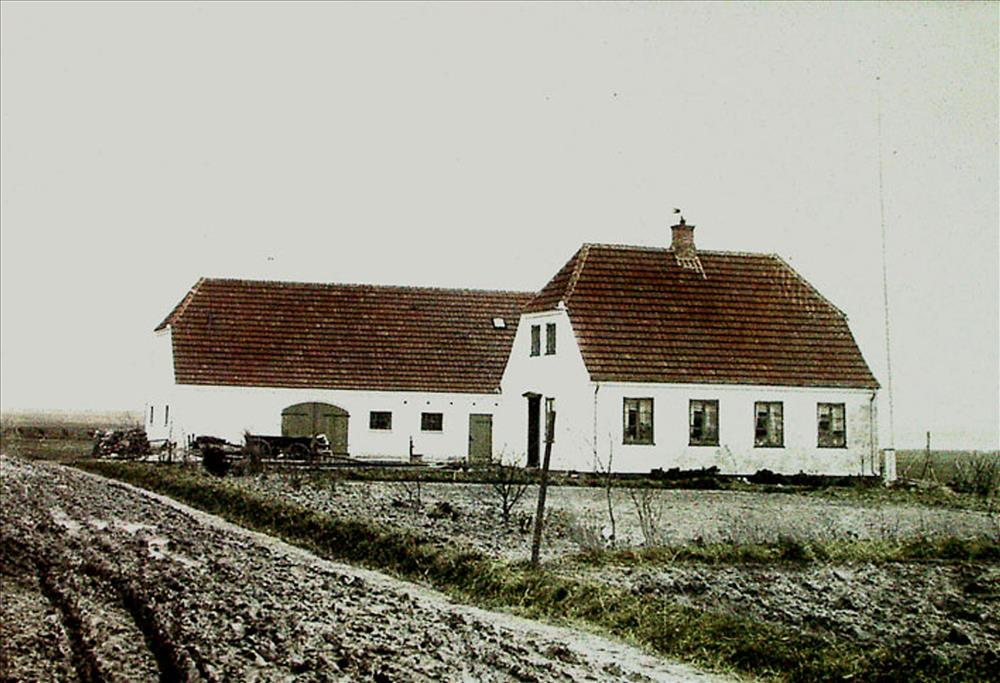
One of the first smallholdings built at Lindersvold in 1922

In 1821, the Barony of Gavnø was dissolved as a result of the lensafløsningslov of 1919. In 1923, Lindersvold was acquired by John Petersen. He sold off most of the land for smallholdings. His widow sold the main building and tremaining land to the Christmas Stamp Committee. Lindersvold was then operated as the Christmas Stamp Foundation's fourth Christmas Stamp Home until 1959. It was from 1946 headed by Poul Billgren. A drawing of the main building featured on the foundation's official 1934 Christmas stamp. It was printed in 16.5 copies and raised DKK 261,609.

== Today ==
In 1994, Lindersvold was acquired by Den selvejende institution Fælleseje. It is now operated as a primary school for children with special challenges and also serves as a training center for the Humana Volunteers program, where participants prepare for international development projects focused on sustainability, education, and community development in collaboration with Humana People to People.

== Cultural references ==
Fru Merthe til Lindersvold is a so-called hjemstavnsspil about Merete Sophie von Schildern, née Urne.

== List of owners ==
- ( -1593) Christoffer Lindenov
- (1593-1606) Forskellige ejere
- (1606- ) Godske Lindenov
- ( - ) Karen Henriksdatter Gyldenstierne, gift Lindenov
- ( -1672) Christoffer Godskesen Lindenov
- (1672-1673) Axel Urne
- (1673-1680) Rabe von Schildern
- (1680-1724) Merete Sophie Urne, gift von Schildern
- (1724-1728) Hedevig Sophie von Schildern, gift Kalckreut
- (1728-1732) Kirstine Marie Krabbe, gift Kruse
- (1732-1785) Otto Thott
- (1785-1797) Holger Reedtz-Thott
- (1797-1862) Otto Reedtz-Thott
- (1862-1923) Kjeld Thor Tage Otto Reedtz-Thott
- (1923- ) John Petersen
- ( -1927) Widow of John Petersen
- (1927- ) Julemærkekomiteen
- (1994- ) Den selvejende institution Fælleseje
