= Bredo von Munthe af Morgenstierne =

Norwegian lawyer and judge

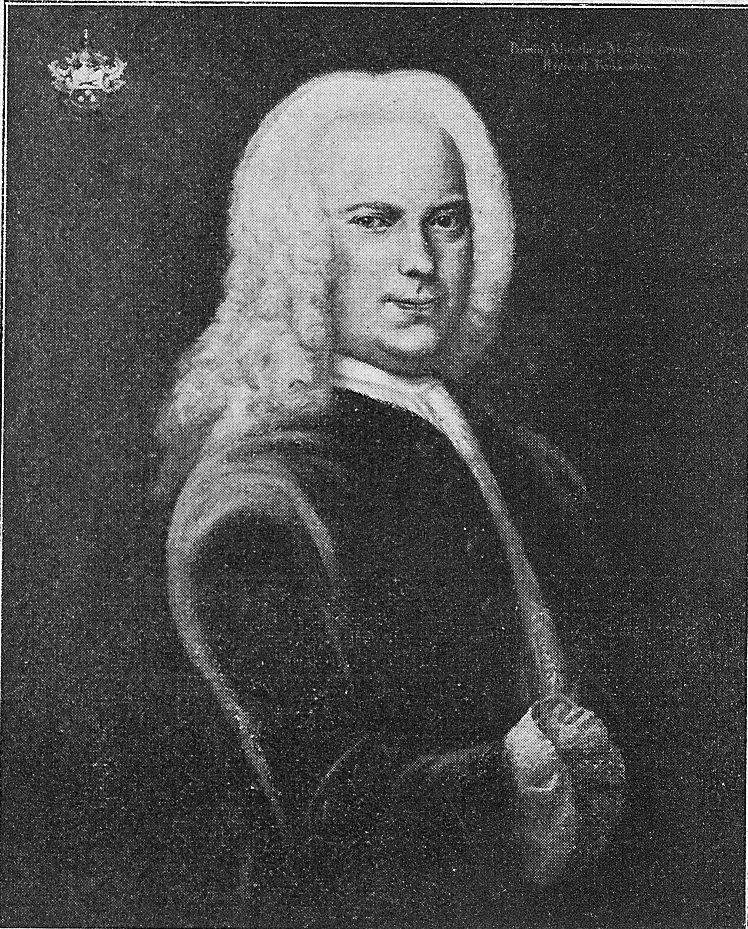
- Bredo von Munthe af Morgenstjerne painted by A. Brünniche
- Born: 23 September 1701; Gudbrandsdalen, Norway
- Died: 13 January 1757 (aged 55); Bækkeskov, Denmark
- Occupation: Supreme Court justice

Bredo von Munthe af Morgenstierne (23 September 1701 – 13 January 1757), born Bredo Munthe, was a Norwegian-Danish civil servant, Supreme Court justice and landowner who was raised to the peerage under the name Munthe af Morgenstjerne in 1755. He owned Bækkeskov Manor at Præstø from 1742.

== Early life and education ==
Munthe was born in the local rectory at Froen, Gudbrandsdalen, Norway, the son of provost Otto Munthe (1659–1733) by his second wife Else Cathrine Hammer (1669–1736). His great-grandfather was Bishop Ludvig Munthe. He attended Kristiania Latin School and enrolled at the University of Copenhagen in 1718 where he graduated in theology in 1720 before studying law.

== Career ==
Munthe was employed at the Supreme Court in 1728. In 1735, he was appointed as attorney ("kammeradvokat"). He was appointed as Supreme Court justice in 1747 and was in 1747–49 and again in 1753–57 also a member of the economy and commerce college. He worked on a revision of Danish law from 1737, initially alone and later as part of a commission, but with meagre results.

== Property ==
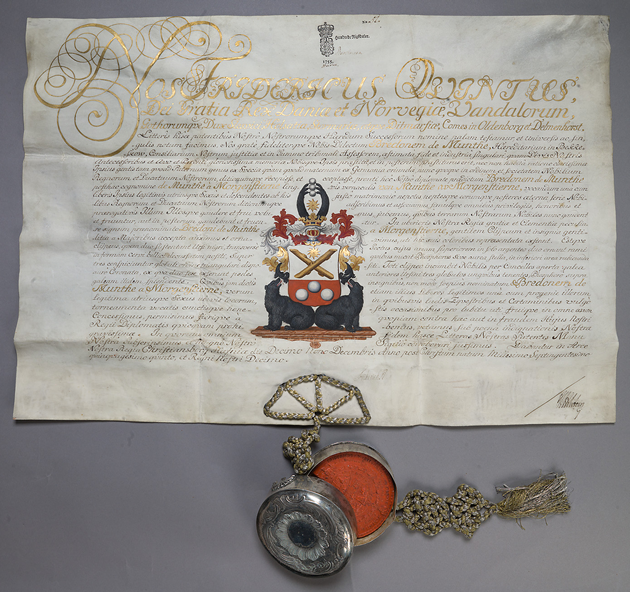
Munthe af Morgenstjerne's letters patent from 1755

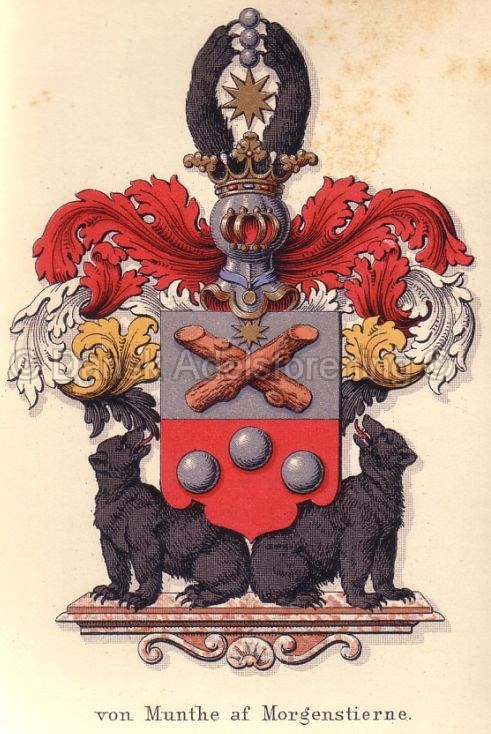
Munthe af Morgenstjerne's coat of arms

Munthe was from 1741 also the owner of Bækkeskov at Præstø. He was for a while the owner of the estate Petersborg at Høsterkøb where he established a plantation of mulberry trees before selling it in 1752.

He was appointed as Kancelliråd (lit.: Chancellery Counsel) in 1737 and counsellor ("Justitsråd") in 1747. He was ennobled by letters patent under the name Munthe af Morgenstjerne in 1755.

== Personal life ==
Munthe married Anna Dorothea Smith (10 September 1713 – 18 February 1777), a daughter of Fiscal-General Troels Smith (1672–1730) and Ellen Kaasbøll (1682–1748), on 25 May 1730 in the Church of Our Lady in Copenhagen.

He died on 13 January 1757 at Bækkeskov and is buried in Everdrup Cemetery. He was survived by one daughter and three soms: Helene Elisabeth von Munthe af Morgenstjerne (1733–1802), Otto Christopher von Munthe af Morgenstierne (1748–1787), Caspar Wilhelm von Munthe af Morgenstierne (1744–1811) and Truels Smith Munthe af Morgenstierne (1745–1810).
