= Strandgade 24 =

Listed Neoclassical townhouse on Strandgade in Copenhagen, Denmark

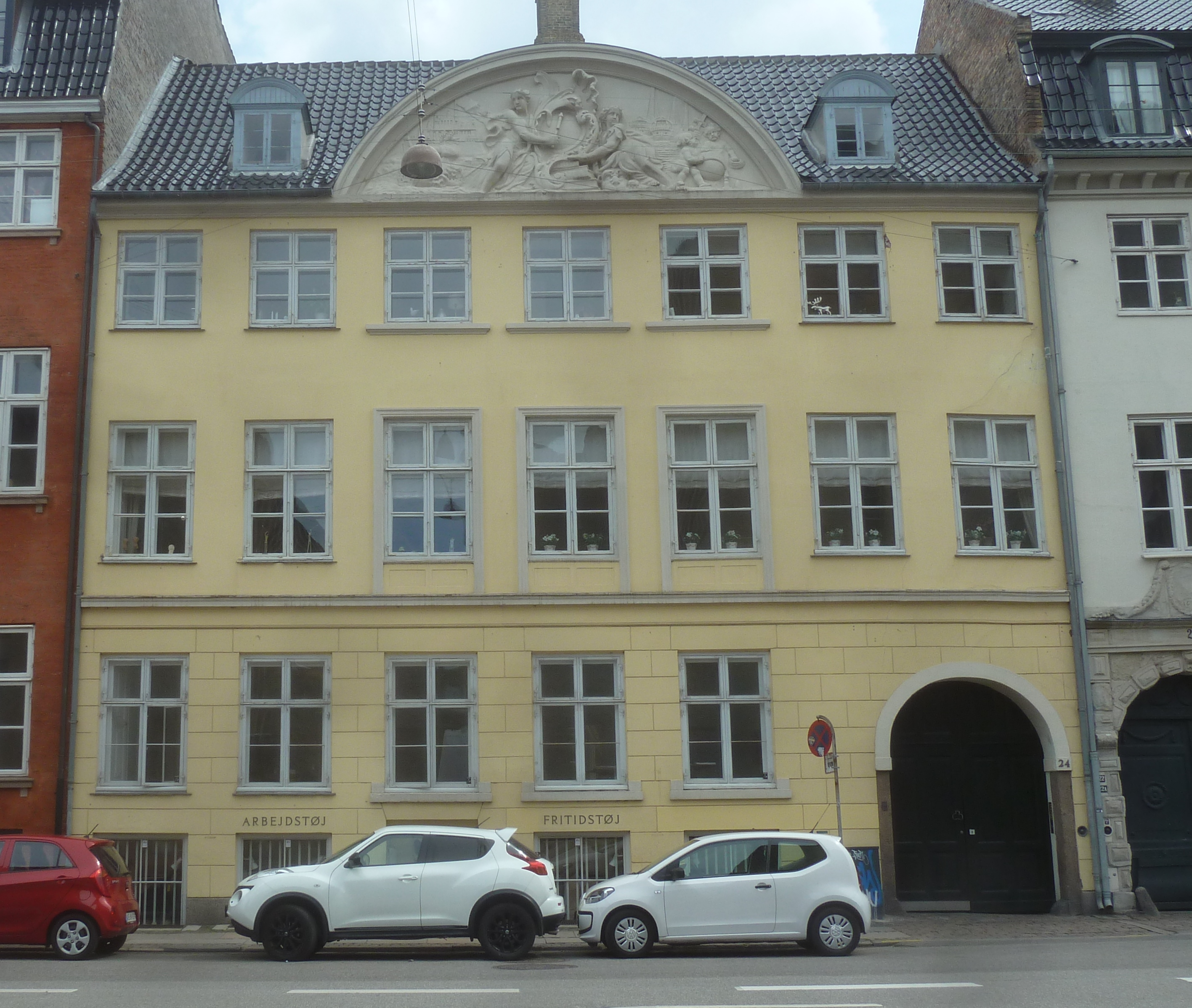
- The building seen from across the street
- Interactive map of the Strandgade 24 area

General information
- Architectural style: Neoclassical
- Location: Copenhagen, Denmark, Denmark
- Coordinates: 55°40′26″N 12°35′23″E
- Completed: 1769

The Strandgade 24 is a listed Neoclassical townhouse located on Strandgade in Copenhagen, Denmark.

== History ==
=== 17th and 18th centuries ===
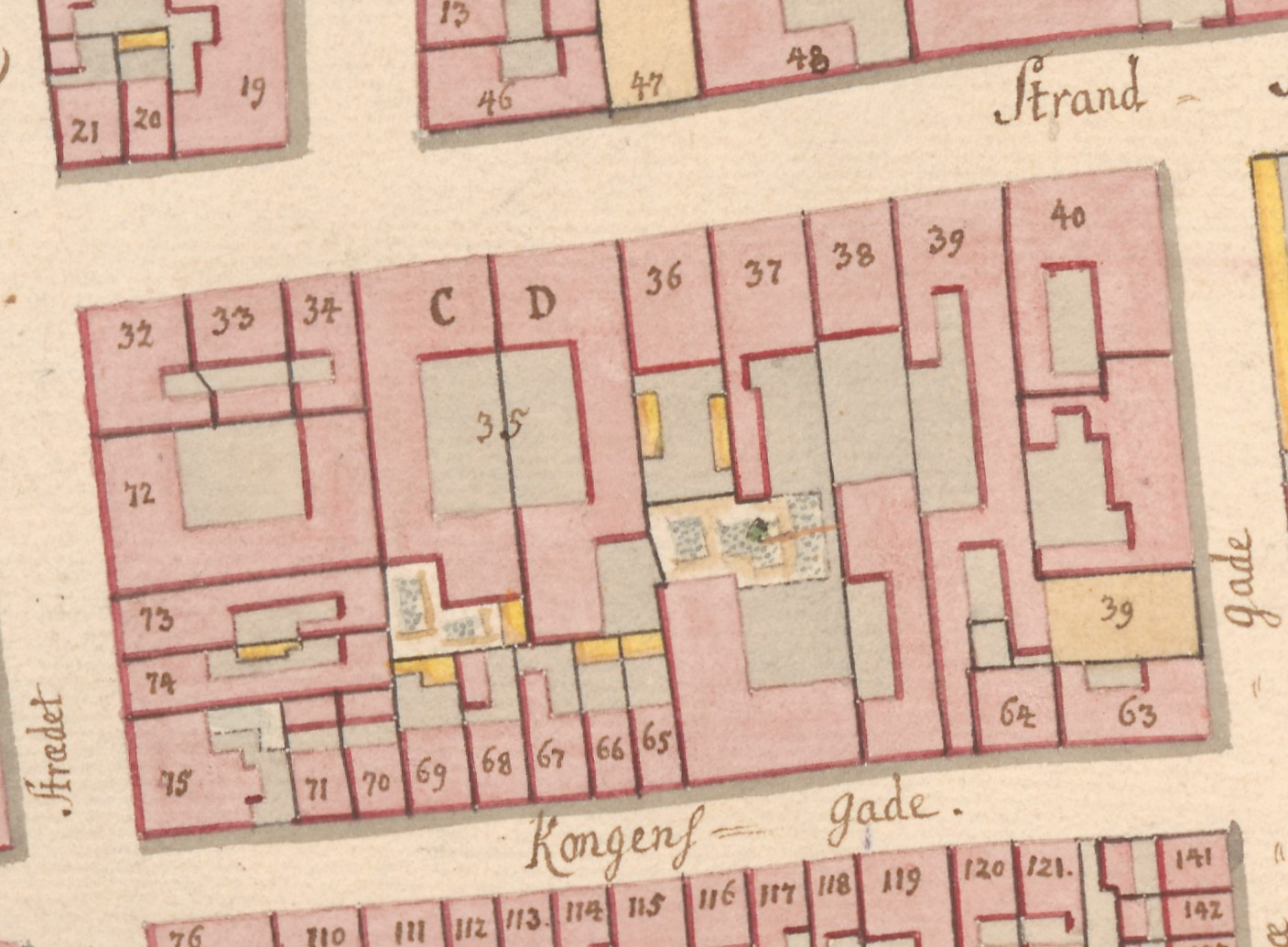
No. 35 C seen in a detail from Christian Gedde's map of Christianshavn Quarter, 1757

The site was originally part of the same property as Strandgade 22. In 1749, it was sold separately to Franz Fæddersens. He worked for the Danish Asiatic Company on the other side of the street. He heightened the building with one floor.

The property was marked as No. 35 C on Christian Gedde's 1757 map of Christianshavn but later referred to as No. 35B. It was owned by general war commissioner Høyer in 1756.

In 1790, No. 35B was acquired by Charles August Selby, an Englishman who had settled in Copenhagen in 1753 and set up his own trading company in 1777.

=== Niels Brock Hansen ===
The property was home to a single household at the 1801 census. Niels Brock Hansen (1765-1818), a merchant (grosserer), resided in the building with his wife Lene Maria Hansen (née Sommerfeldt, 1779–1847), their six children (aged one to nine), four office clerks, a coachman, a caretaker, a maid, a wet nurse and a female cook.

Hansen's property was listed as No. 46 in the new cadastre of 1806. He owned it until his death in 1818.

=== Heinricy family, 1828–1911 ===
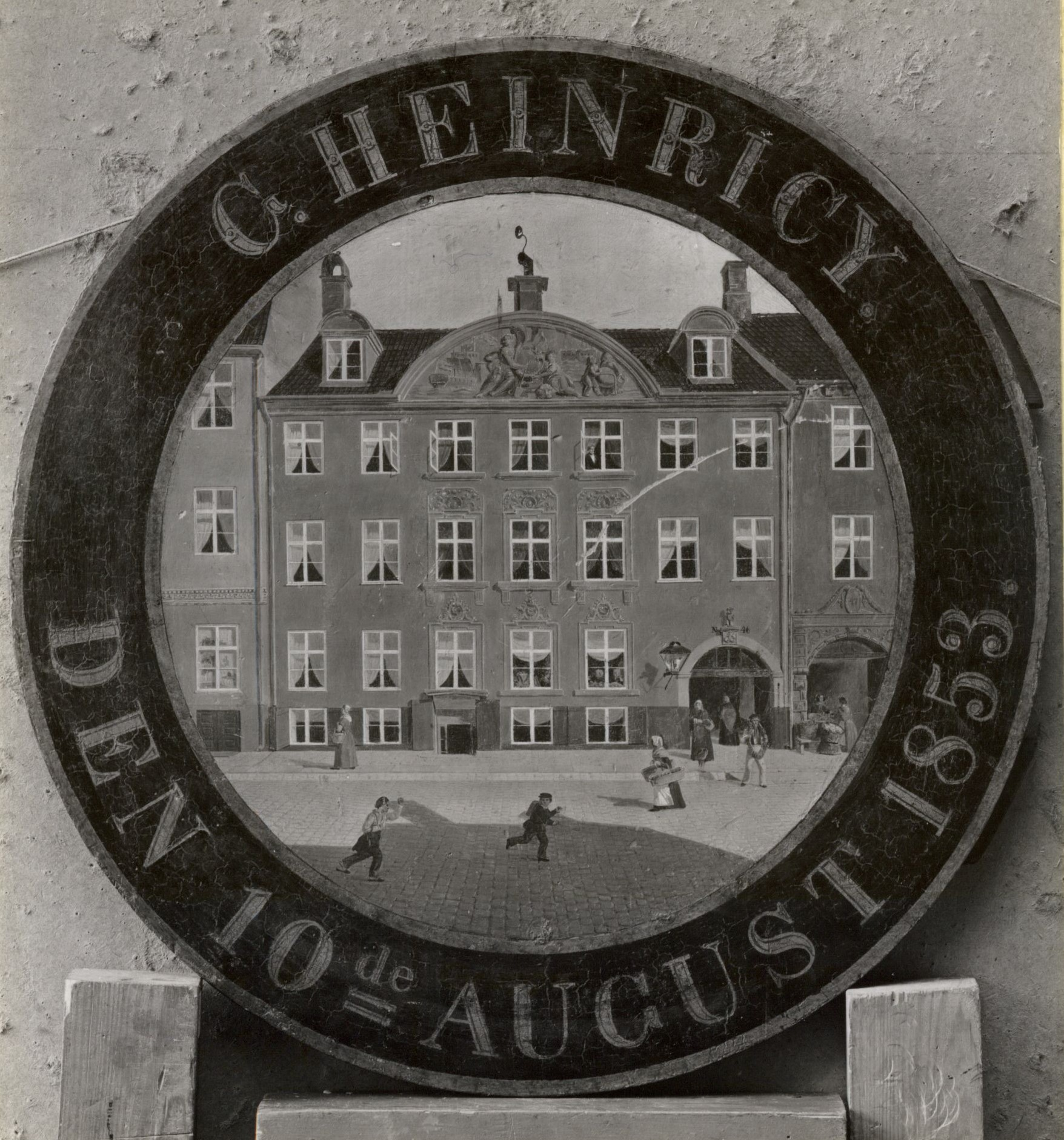
The building seen on C. Heinricy's membership target from the Royal Danish Shooting Society, 1853

Georg V. A. Heinricy (1796–1869) established a bakery in the building in 1928.

The property was home to 37 residents in four households at the 1840 census. Georg Heinricy resided on the ground floor with his wife Maria Sally, their six children (aged one to 13), a housekeeper (the wife's sister), one lodger, three maids, four bakers, two baker's apprentices and a caretaker. Johan Christian von Osten, a judge and skriver of Amager Birk, resided on the first floor with his wife Maria Magdalene von Osten and one maid. Georg Henrik Mossin, a manor in the Civilian Infantry, resided on the second floor with his wife Anna Chatarine Mossin, their 31-year-old daughter Pauline Madsine Mossin, their 29-year-old son Andreas Michael Mossin (master metalworker, gørtlermester), a lodger, two metalworker's aopprentices (gørtlerlærlinge) and a maid. Magretha ...?? Hansen, the proprietor of a tavern in the basement, resided in the associated dwelling with a foster child, three lodgers and two maids.

The property was home to 27 residents in the three households at the 1850 census. Georg Wilhelm Albert Heinving's household on the ground floor accounted for 18 of the residents. Johan Christian v Østen was now residing on the first floor with the housekeeper Frederikke Henriette Evert and one maid. Christian Harboe, a civil servant in the Ministry of Defence with the title of justitsråd, resided on the second floor with his wife Ida Amalie Charlotte Harboe (née Hahn), their three sons (aged 16 to 18) and one maid.

=== 20th century ===
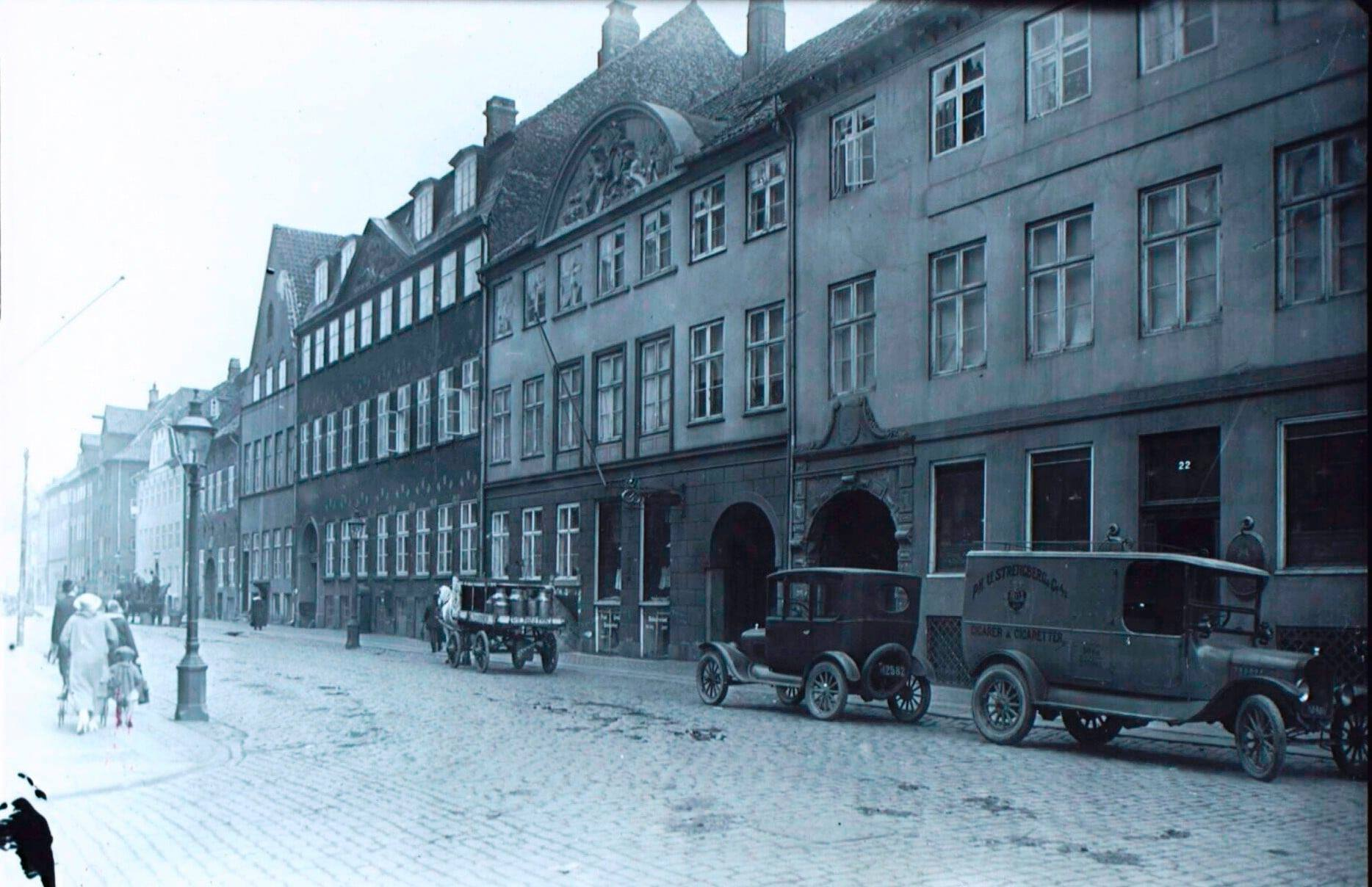
Strandgade 24.

In 1911, Strandgade 24 was acquired by H. P. Wittenkamp. The Wittenkamp family operated the bakery under the name H. P. Wittenkamp & Søn until the 1970s.

The architects H. Christiansen and Jens Ladegaard undertook a renovation of the building in 1988–1989 which received an award from the City of Copenhagen.

== Architecture ==
The house is seven bays wide.

The building owes much of its appearance to an adaption undertaken by Fædersen in the years after 1743. He heightened the building by one storey and also added the rounded pediment as well as the two flanking dormers. The rounded pediment matches the similar feature on the Danish Asia Company's former headquarters on the other side of the street. It features a relief of Mercury and Neptune, representing trade and seafaring. The relief is attributed to I. C. Petzhold. The building's Rococo-style main staircase was installed by Fædersen.

The secondary staircase to the rear dates from the 1940s. The rustication on the ground floor, the secondary cornice and the niche under the window of the central bay on the first floor date from 1864. The rear and cross wings were also built for Fæddersen. The wall towards No. 22 was constructed when this part of the property was sold off in 1743.

== See also ==
- List of listed buildings in Christianshavn
