= Otto Christopher von Munthe af Morgenstierne =

Danish judge

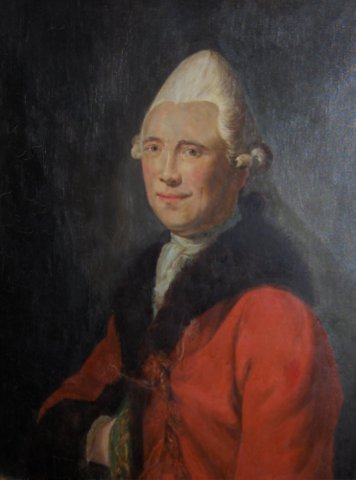
- Born: 6 January 1735; Copenhagen, Norway
- Died: 17 March 1809 (aged 73); Bækkeskov, Denmark
- Occupation: Supreme Court justice

Otto Christopher von Munthe af Morgenstierne (6 January 1735 – 17 March 1809) was a Danish civil servant, judge and landowner. He was the owner of Bækkeskov at Præstø.

== Early life and education ==
Munthe was born in Copenhagen, the son of Bredo von Munthe af Morgenstierne and Anna Dorothea Smith. He graduated in law from the University of Copenhagen in 1753. His father was ennobled by letters patent under the name Munthe af Morgenstjerne in 1755.

== Career ==
Ub 1657, Munthe af Gyldenstjerne was employed as a secretary in Danish Chancellery. In 1758, he became deputy judge on Zealand and Møn. In 1767, he was appointed as War and Land Commissioner of Zealand, Lolland, Falster and Møn. He became a member of the Generalitets- og Kommissariatskollegiet in 1783 but was dismissed in 1789, possibly due to his opposition to the abolition of the Stavnsbånd.

== Property ==
Munthe af Morgenstjerne's mother ceded Bækkeskov to him in 1759. He shut down the small village of Bækkeskov and placed the land directly under the manor. He sold the estate to English-born merchant and shipowner Charles August Selbye in 1795.

== Personal life ==
Munthe af Morgenstierne married three times. His first wife was Marie Bolette Reichard (1741–1765), a daughter of naval officer Jesper Hansen Reichard (died 1752) and Margrethe Marie née Berg. They married on 26 June 1760. His second wife was Christine Bodille Birgitte de Flindt (1748–1787), a daughter of konferensråd Henrik de Flindt by his first wife Johanne Christine née Riis (died 1755). They married on 22 February 1768. His third wife was Elisabeth Flindt (1743–1819), the widow of kammerråd Thor Hansen Wederkinch and a daughter of major Henrik Flindt and Vilhelmine Elisabeth Charlotte née Merchel.

Otto Christopher von Munthe af Morgenstierne died at Hillerød on 17 March 1809. He is buried at Nyhuse.

A son by his second wife was judge (sorenskriver) in Bamble, Bredo Henrik von Munthe af Morgenstierne (1774–1835). He established a branch of the Munthe af Morgenstjerne family in Norway.
