= Charles August Selby =

English-Danish merchant and landowner

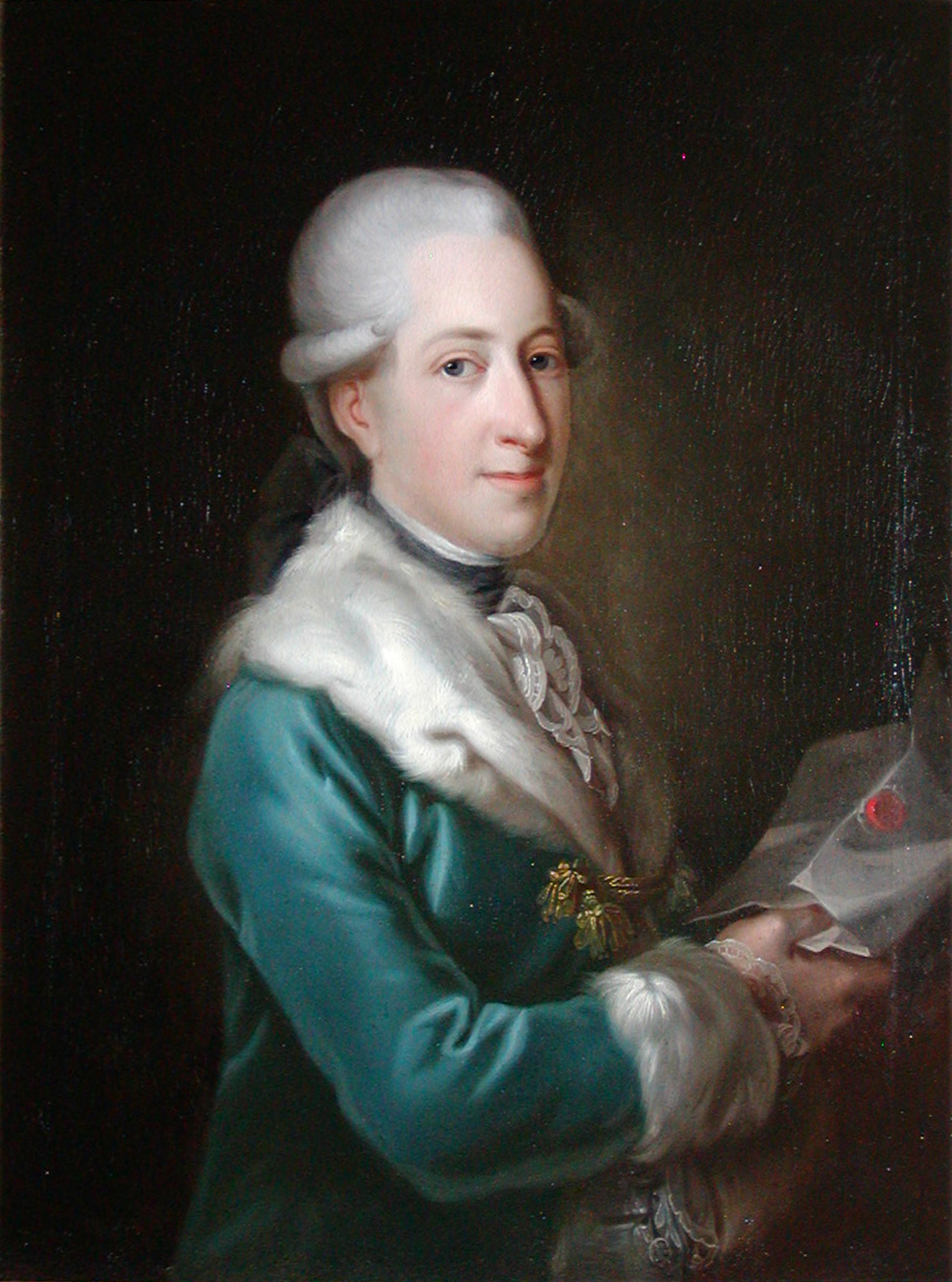
- Charles August Selby
- Born: 24 October 1755; Biddlestone Hall, Northumberland, England
- Died: 15 March 1823 (aged 67); Güldenstein, Holsten
- Occupation: Merchant

Charles August Selby (24 October 1755 – 15 March 1823) was an English-Danish merchant and landowner. He built the Bækkeskov manor house at Præstø and Orupgaard on Falster. The Baron's oldest son, the politician and landowner, Charles Borre Selby, inherited the estate.

== Early life ==
Selby was born in London, the son of Thomas Selbye (1711-1787), the owner of Biddlestone, Northumberland. He was educated by English Benedictine monks in Douai in Flanders,

== Career in commerce ==
Selby came to Copenhagen in around 1770 and in 1771 became a partner in William Chippendale's firm which had interests in the Union House sugar refinery. He was also associated with the Copenhagen firm of Selby & Co., which later became Selby & Ter-Borch, and in 1795, the company was taken over by Selby's partner, the Austrian consul Thomas Ter-Borch. Selby developed a profitable interest in West-Indian trade until 1795-

== Personal life and property ==
Charles Selbye married Birgitte Kirstine Borre (1757-1809) on 26 November 1777. She was a daughter of Selbye's neighbor, tobacco manufacturer Peter Borre and Sophia Aagaard.

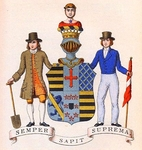
Orupgaard was built by Selby.

In 1795, he bought Bækkeskov and the Bredeshave farm. There, he was successful in introducing English and Flemish methods of farming. He built a Neoclassical manor at Bækkeskov but surprisingly sold it again in 1805 for reasons unknown. Selby was styled as Baron in 1796.

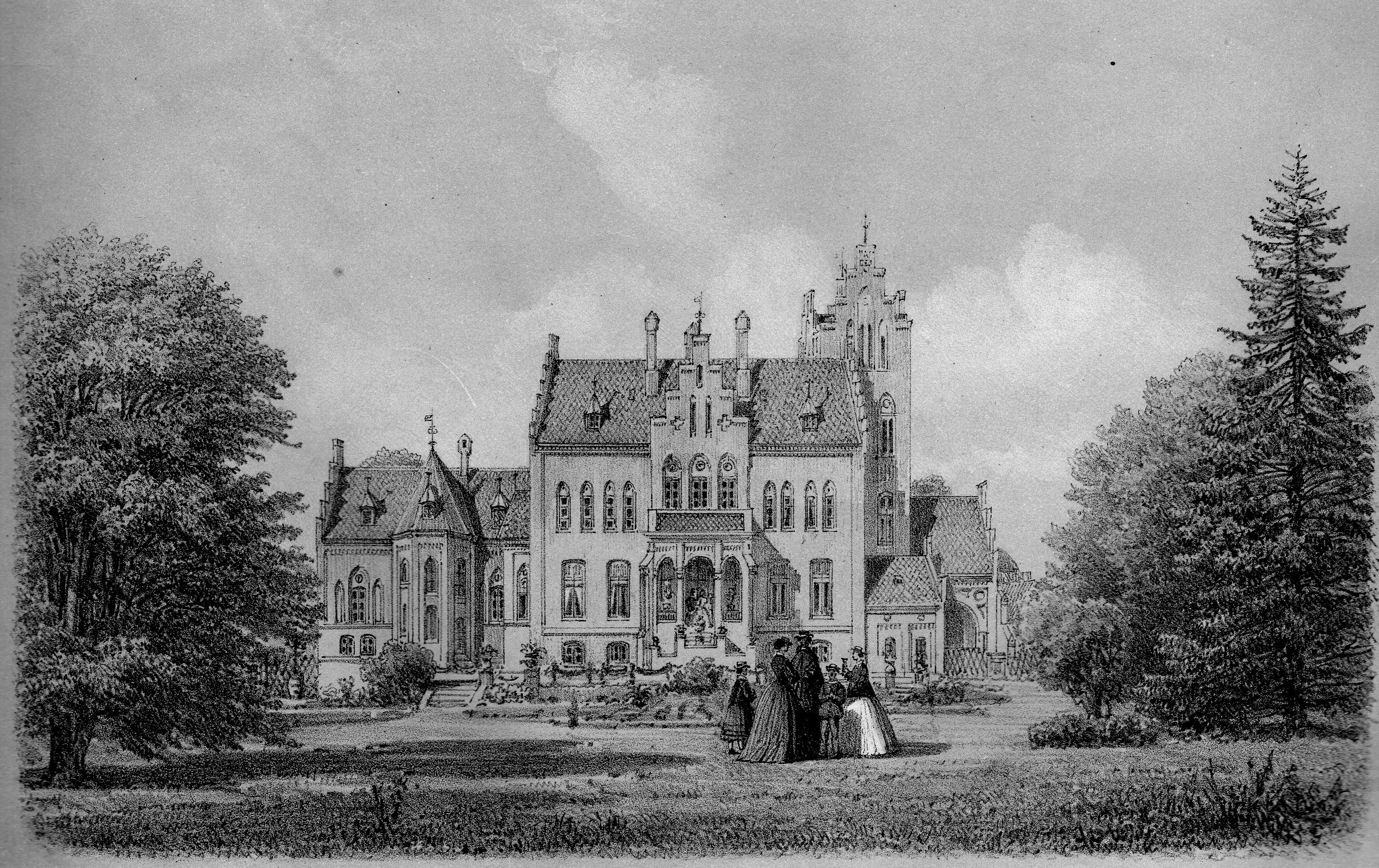
Orupgaard was built by Selby.

After his first wife died in 1809, he bought Orupgård on the island of Falster, redesigning the manor and developing farming there. Through his second wife, he acquired Güldenstein in Holstein together with several farms in the vicinity where he applied model approaches to cattle farming and forestry for the remainder of his life.

Selbye purchased the house at Strandgade 24 in 1780. He sold it in 1785 but reacquired it in the first half of the 1790s. From his correspondence, it can be seen Selby was a well-educated, gentlemanly figure with an interest in art and aesthetics. He demonstrated strong affinities with Denmark, donating considerable sums for the reconstruction of its fleet.
