= Andreas Bjørn House =

Historic property in Copenhagen, Denmark

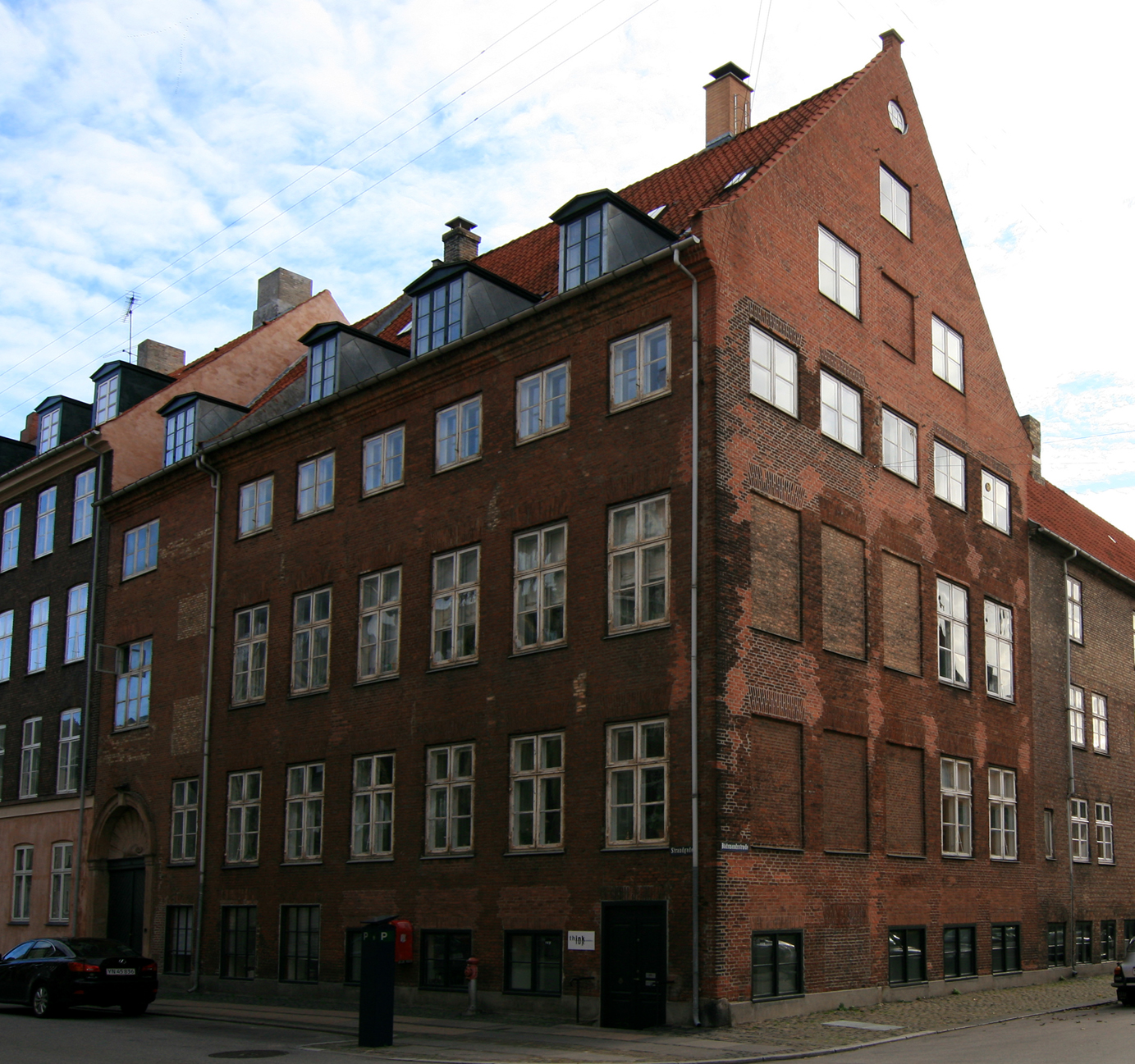
- The Andreas Bjørn House
- Interactive map of the Andreas Bjørn House area

General information
- Location: Copenhagen, Denmark
- Coordinates: 55°40′31.05″N 12°35′31.75″E
- Inaugurated: 1734; 292 years ago

The Andreas Bjørn House is a historic property located at the corner of Strandgade (No. 46) and Bådsmandsstræde in the Christianshavn neighbourhood of Copenhagen, Denmark. It was built for Andreas Bjørn in 1734 and listed on the Danish registry of protected buildings and places in 1918. A sugar refinery named Union House was from 1771 to 1811 located in a now demolished warehouse adjacent to the building by a group of British merchants and plantation owners from St. Croix in the Danish West Indies.

== History ==
=== Andreas Bjørn and his dockyard ===
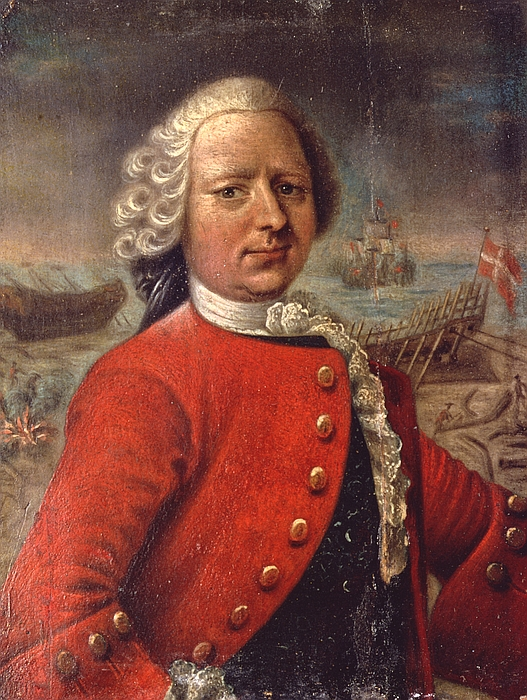
Andreas Bjørn in 1834

Bådsmandsstræde was the northernmost street in Johan Semp's original masterplan for Christianshavn from 1617. The narrow tract of land on the north side of Bådsmandsstræde was in the beginning of the 18th century the site of a lumberyard owned by Niels Alsing. It reached all the way from Strandgade to Christianshavn Canal and was partly lined with a row of wooden warehouses along the street. The property was in 1732 acquired by Andreas Bjørn. He demolished most of the buildings and constructed the Andreas Bjørn House at the corner of Strandgade and Bådsmandsstræde in 1834. He was also granted permission to establish a dockyard on reclaimed land to the north of his new property. Separated from the rest of Christianshavn by a branch of Christianshavn Canal (now Wilders Kanal), his dockyard became known as Bjørnsholm (Bjørn's Isle).

Andreas Bjørn died in 1750. His widow kept the property after her husband's death. It was listed as No. 53 in the new cadastre of 1756. After her death in 1758, it passed to their daughter Karen Bjørn (1742–1795). On 22 April 1761, she married writer and philosopher Thyge Rothe (1731–1795) in the Church of Our Saviour. In 1763, he purchased Tybjerggaard.

=== British owners and the Union House sugar refinery ===
In 1766 the property was purchased by William Chippendale (1747–1802). Originally from England, he had settled as a merchant in Copenhagen in 1760. He instantly sold part of the garden (closest to Christianshavn Caal) to ship builder Ole Gad.

Chippendale's company traded on the Danish West Indies with its own fleet of merchant ships. Chippendale developed a good relationship to a number of Irish and English plantation owners on St. Croix. One of them, Nicolas Tuite, made a significant investment in his company. Robert Tuite and Charles August Selby, his son and nephew, were in return secured positions in the enterprise. Selby established his own trading house after a couple of years.

In 1771, Chippendale, Selby, Tuite and two more investors from St. Croix established a sugar refinery in the warehouse located adjacent to Chippendale's House in Strandgade. The two new partners were Theobald Bourke and Christopher MacEvoy Sr.. The name of the sugar refinery was Union House.

In 1777, Robert Tuite became the sole owner of the house and sugar refinery in Strandgade. This happened on the same day that he purchased the Prince William Mansion on Sankt Annæ Plads in the fashionable Frederiksstaden. In 1779, he sold the Strandgade property back to Chippendale, Selbye and John Duncan. John Duncan and John Good, a merchant based in Helsingør, were the owners in 1784. John Good and Charles Selbye owned it from 1792 and John Good owned it alone from 1802.

The sugar refinery closed in 1801. Count Knud Bille Schack and Lauritz Berth purchased the building in 1812.

== See also ==
- Christopher MacEvoy Sr.
