= Albert, Duke of Schleswig-Holstein =

Albert
- Duke of Schleswig-Holstein
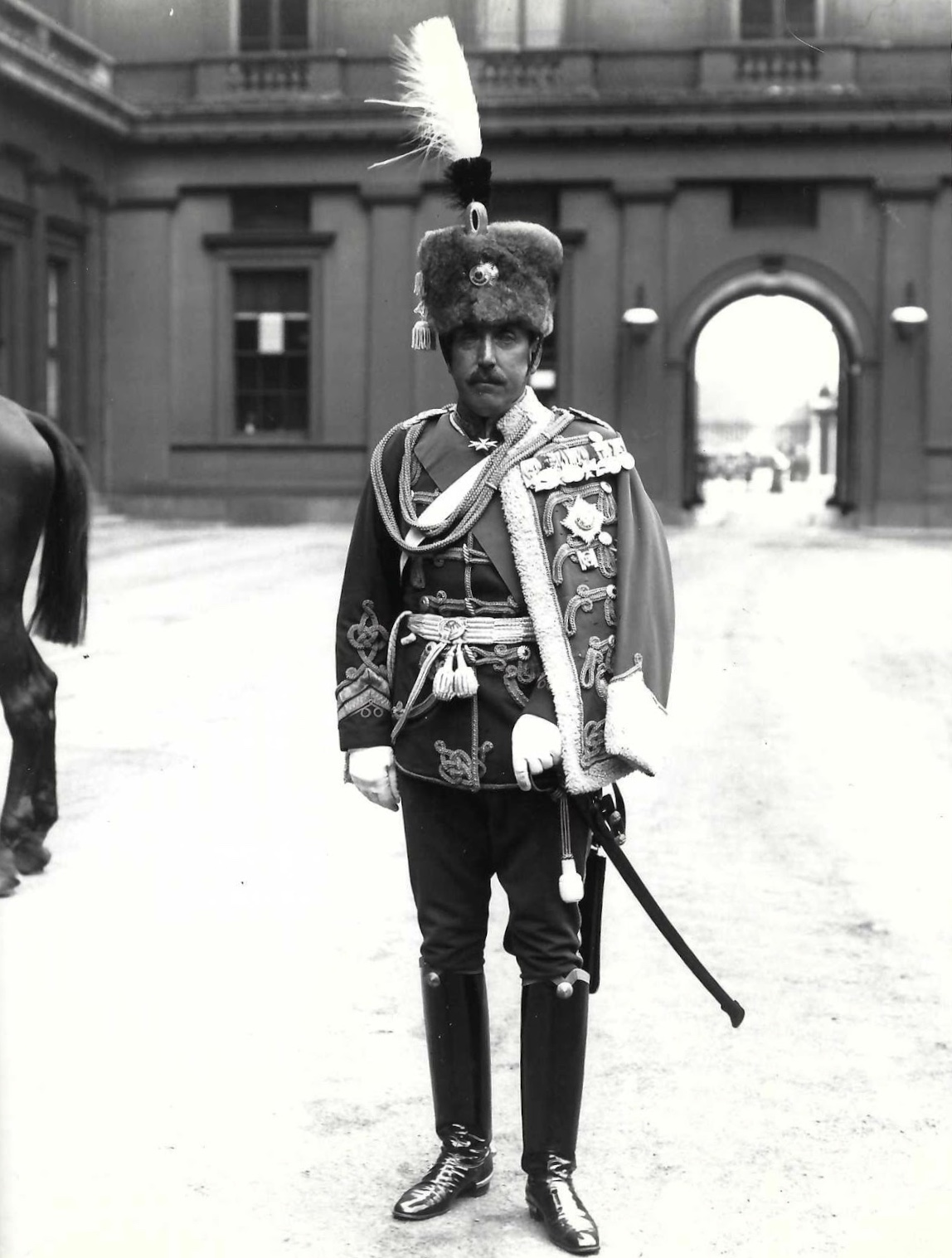
- Albert in 1914
- Born: 26 February 1869; Frogmore House, Windsor, Berkshire
- Died: 27 April 1931 (aged 62); Primkenau, Germany
- Issue: Valerie zu Schleswig-Holstein (illegitimate)
Names
- Albert John Charles Frederick Alfred George
- House: Schleswig-Holstein-Sonderburg-Augustenburg
- Father: Prince Christian of Schleswig-Holstein
- Mother: Princess Helena of the United Kingdom
- Occupation: Military officer

Albert, Duke of Schleswig-Holstein (Albert John Charles Frederick Alfred George; 26 February 1869 – 27 April 1931), was a grandson of Queen Victoria. He was the second son of Victoria's daughter Princess Helena by her husband Prince Christian of Schleswig-Holstein. Prince Albert was the head of the House of Oldenburg, and also the House of Schleswig-Holstein-Sonderburg-Augustenburg and the fourth Duke of Schleswig-Holstein between 1921 and 1931.

== Early life and military career ==
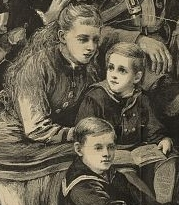
Prince Albert (upper right) in around 1877 with his cousins Princess Charlotte and Prince Ernest

Prince Albert grew up at Cumberland Lodge in Windsor Great Park. He was known as "Abby" to his family. He was baptised in the private chapel at Windsor Castle on 31 March 1869. His godparents were the Dowager Queen of Denmark (represented by Queen Victoria), the Princess of Wales (represented by Princess Louise), Princess Louis of Hesse and by Rhine (represented by the Duchess of Roxburghe), the Duke of Edinburgh (represented by Prince Arthur), the Duke of Schleswig-Holstein (represented by Prince Leopold), the King of Saxony (represented by Baron Oswald von Fabrice) and the Duke of Cambridge.

Like his elder brother, Prince Christian Victor, whom he followed to Lambrook Preparatory School in Berkshire, later attending Charterhouse School. Albert was destined for a military career. However, while Christian Victor's was in the British Army, Albert served with the Prussian Army. He was commissioned Lieutenant into the 1st Hessian Dragoon Guards eventually reaching the rank of lieutenant colonel in the 3rd Uhlans of the Guard. During World War I he was excused from service against the British by the German Emperor, and spent the war in Berlin on the staff of the Governor of the city.

== Duchy ==
In 1921, the Prince succeeded as the head of the Schleswig-Holstein-Sonderburg-Augustenburg of the House of Schleswig-Holstein, following his childless cousin Duke Ernst Gunther of Schleswig-Holstein-Sonderburg-Augustenburg. This was the senior branch of the House of Oldenburg, to which the Duke of Schleswig-Holstein, the Emperor of Russia, the King of Denmark, the King of Norway, the King of the Hellenes and the Grand Duke of Oldenburg belonged.

== Succession ==
As the Duke of Schleswig-Holstein and as the Head of the House of Oldenburg, Duke Albert was succeeded by his distant cousin Friedrich Ferdinand, Duke of Schleswig-Holstein-Sonderburg-Glücksburg (who happened to be also the husband of a daughter of Albert's uncle Frederick VIII, Duke of Schleswig-Holstein-Sonderburg-Augustenburg).

== Issue ==
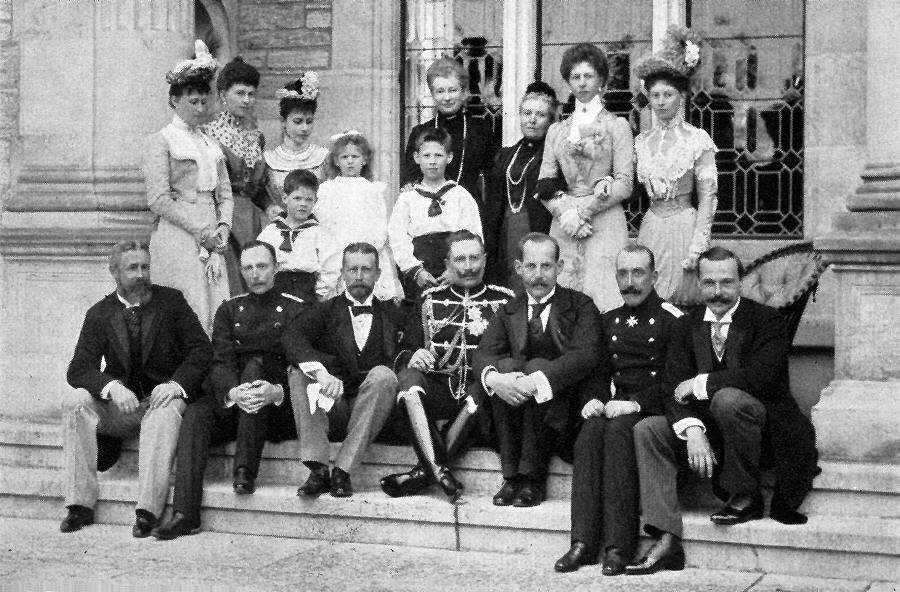
Prince Albert (bottom row, second from right) with members of his family in May 1900

Prince Albert never married, but he fathered an illegitimate daughter, Valerie Marie. Born 3 April 1900 in Liptovský Mikuláš, Hungary, Austria-Hungary, she was placed almost immediately after her birth with Anna Rosenthal and her husband Rubin Schwalb, of Jewish origin. On 15 April 1931, shortly before his death, Albert wrote to her, admitting to her his paternity. After this, on 12 May she changed her surname from Schwalb, the name of her foster family, to "zu Schleswig-Holstein".

The name of Valerie Marie's mother was never made public and has never been identified. Albert told no one. He did inform his two sisters that the woman was of "high noble birth".

On 28 June 1925, in Vienna, Valerie Marie (before Albert's acknowledgement of paternity) married the lawyer Ernst Johann Wagner, but divorced him on 14 February 1938; the childless marriage was formally annulled in Salzburg on 4 October 1940. When she intended to marry again, it became important to establish her parentage officially, as the Nuremberg Laws prohibited marriages between Jews and Aryans. This was done with the assistance of her aunts, Princesses Helena Victoria and Marie Louise; they signed a statement attesting to her paternal lineage on 26 July 1938, officially acknowledging her.

In Berlin-Charlottenburg on 15 June 1939, a civil marriage took place between her and Prince Engelbert-Charles, 16th Duke of Aarschot and 10th Duke of Arenberg, Head of the (formerly Sovereign) House of Arenberg (1899-1974) and, after the annulment of her first marriage, a religious ceremony took place in Münster near Westfalen, on 9 October 1940; like her first marriage, this union was childless too. Valerie Marie died in Mont-Baron, Nice, France, on 14 August 1953 in an apparent suicide.

== Honours and awards ==
=== Orders and decorations ===
- United Kingdom:
  - Knight Grand Cross of the Royal Victorian Order, 30 June 1897
  - Knight Grand Cross of the Order of the Bath (civil division), 27 November 1900
  - Knight of Justice of the Venerable Order of Saint John
- Kingdom of Prussia:
  - Grand Cross of the Order of the Red Eagle
  - Service Award Cross
- Duchy of Anhalt: Grand Cross of the Order of Albert the Bear, 1891
- (Saxe-Coburg and Gotha) (Duchy of Saxe-Altenburg) (Saxe-Meiningen) Ernestine duchies: Grand Cross of the Saxe-Ernestine House Order
- Grand Duchy of Hesse: Grand Cross of the Ludwig Order, 25 November 1898
- Russian Empire: Knight of the Order of Saint Vladimir, 4th Class
- Saxe-Weimar-Eisenach: Grand Cross of the Order of the White Falcon

=== Military appointments ===
- Major general à la suite of the Prussian Army

== Ancestry ==
Ancestors of Albert, Duke of Schleswig-Holstein

8. Frederick Christian II, Duke of Schleswig-Holstein-Sonderburg-Augustenburg
4. Christian Augustus II, Duke of Schleswig-Holstein-Sonderburg-Augustenburg
9. Princess Louise Augusta of Denmark
2. Prince Christian of Schleswig-Holstein
10. Count Christian Danneskiold-Samsøe
5. Countess Louise Danneskiold-Samsøe
11. Henriette Kaas
1. Albert, Duke of Schleswig-Holstein
12. Ernest I, Duke of Saxe-Coburg and Gotha
6. Prince Albert of Saxe-Coburg and Gotha
13. Princess Louise of Saxe-Gotha-Altenburg
3. Princess Helena of the United Kingdom
14. Prince Edward, Duke of Kent and Strathearn
7. Victoria, Queen of the United Kingdom
15. Princess Victoria of Saxe-Coburg-Saalfeld

Albert, Duke of Schleswig-Holstein House of Schleswig-Holstein-Sonderburg-Augustenburg Cadet branch of the House of Oldenburg Born: 26 February 1869 Died: 27 April 1931
German nobility
Preceded by Ernst Gunther	Duke of Schleswig-Holstein; 1921–1931	Succeeded by Friedrich Ferdinand
