= Prince Christian Victor of Schleswig-Holstein =

English cricketer and member of the royal family (1867–1900)

Prince Christian Victor
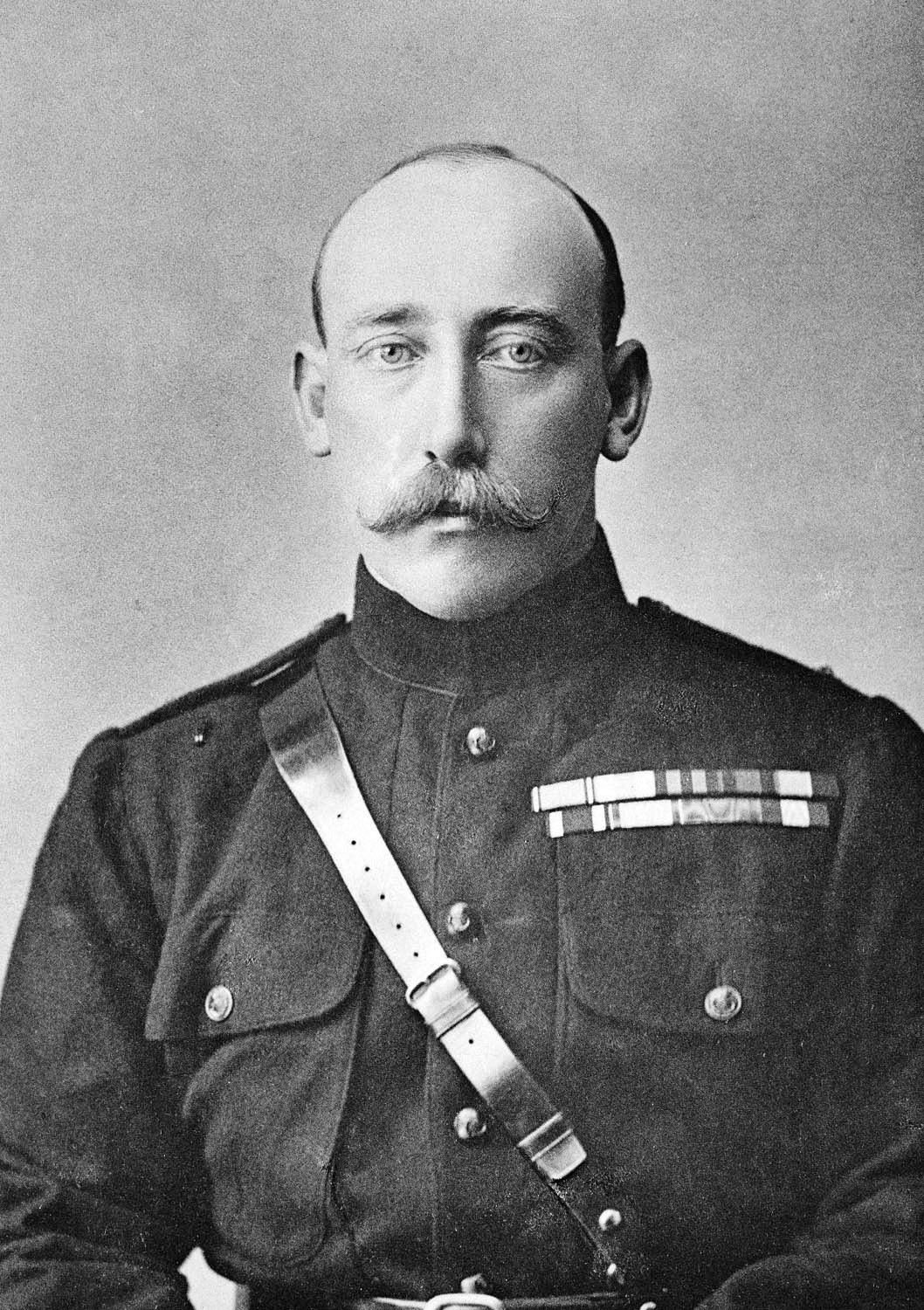
- Christian Victor, circa 1900
- Born: 14 April 1867; Windsor Castle, Berkshire
- Died: 29 October 1900 (aged 33); Pretoria, South African Republic
- Burial: 1 November 1900; Pretoria, South Africa
Names
- Christian Victor Albert Louis Ernst Anton
- House: Schleswig-Holstein-Sonderburg-Augustenburg
- Father: Prince Christian of Schleswig-Holstein
- Mother: Princess Helena of the United Kingdom
- Military career
- Allegiance: United Kingdom
- Branch: British Army
- Service years: 1888–1900
- Rank: Major
- Unit: King's Royal Rifle Corps
- Conflicts: North West Frontier; Ashanti Expedition; Reconquest of Sudan; Second Boer War

Prince Christian Victor Albert Louis Ernst Anton of Schleswig-Holstein (14 April 1867 – 29 October 1900) was a member of the British royal family. He was the eldest son of Princess Helena, third daughter of Queen Victoria.

== Early life ==
Christian Victor was born on 14 April 1867, at Windsor Castle. His father was Prince Christian of Schleswig-Holstein, the third son of Christian, Duke of Augustenborg, and Countess Louise Sophie of Danneskiold-Samsøe. His mother was Princess Helena, the fifth child and third daughter of Queen Victoria of the United Kingdom and Prince Albert. His parents resided in the United Kingdom, at Cumberland Lodge, and he was considered a member of the British royal family. Under letters patent of 1866, he was styled His Highness Prince Christian Victor of Schleswig-Holstein.

He was baptised in the private chapel at Windsor Castle. His godparents were Queen Victoria (his maternal grandmother), the Duke of Augustenburg (his paternal grandfather; represented by Prince Arthur), the Prince of Wales (his maternal uncle), the Crown Princess of Prussia (his maternal aunt; represented by Princess Louise), the Duke of Saxe-Coburg and Gotha (his maternal great-uncle; represented by the Duke of Edinburgh), and the Dowager Princess of Hohenlohe-Langenburg (his maternal half-great-aunt; represented by Lady Churchill).

== Education ==
Christian Victor was educated at Lambrook, Wellington College, Magdalen College, Oxford, and the Royal Military College, Sandhurst. He was commissioned into the King's Royal Rifle Corps (60th Rifles) in 1888, serving in the 4th Battalion King's Royal Rifle Corps.

"Christle", as he was known in the family, was the first member of the Royal Family to attend school instead of being educated by a tutor at home. That he studied at Wellington College made Queen Victoria very happy, as Prince Albert had helped to establish the institution many years before. At Wellington he played for the college First Eleven in 1883 and was captain of the cricket team in 1885. He was also captain of the cricket team while at Magdalen College and at Sandhurst, and made a single first-class appearance, for I Zingari against Gentlemen of England in 1887. He remains the only member of the British royal family to play cricket at such a high level.

== Military career ==
Upon leaving Sandhurst in 1888, Christian Victor became a British Army officer in the King's Royal Rifle Corps. Posted to India, he participated in the Hazara and Miranzi expeditions in 1891 and the Isazi expedition in 1892. Moving to West Africa, in 1895 he participated in the Ashanti Expedition in the Gold Coast, now Ghana.

Upon his return, he was elevated to the rank of Major and then served under Lord Kitchener in 1898 when British and Egyptian troops defeated the Dervishes at Omdurman near Khartoum and recovered the Sudan.

The following year he served as a staff officer in the Second Boer War, being involved in the relief of Ladysmith under General Sir Redvers Buller and later was with Lord Roberts in Pretoria.

== Cricket ==
Christian Victor was a keen amateur cricketer, and played a single first-class match for I Zingari in 1897. He scored 35 and 0. In lesser cricket, he represented Wellington College and also founded his own eponymous cricket team.

== Death ==
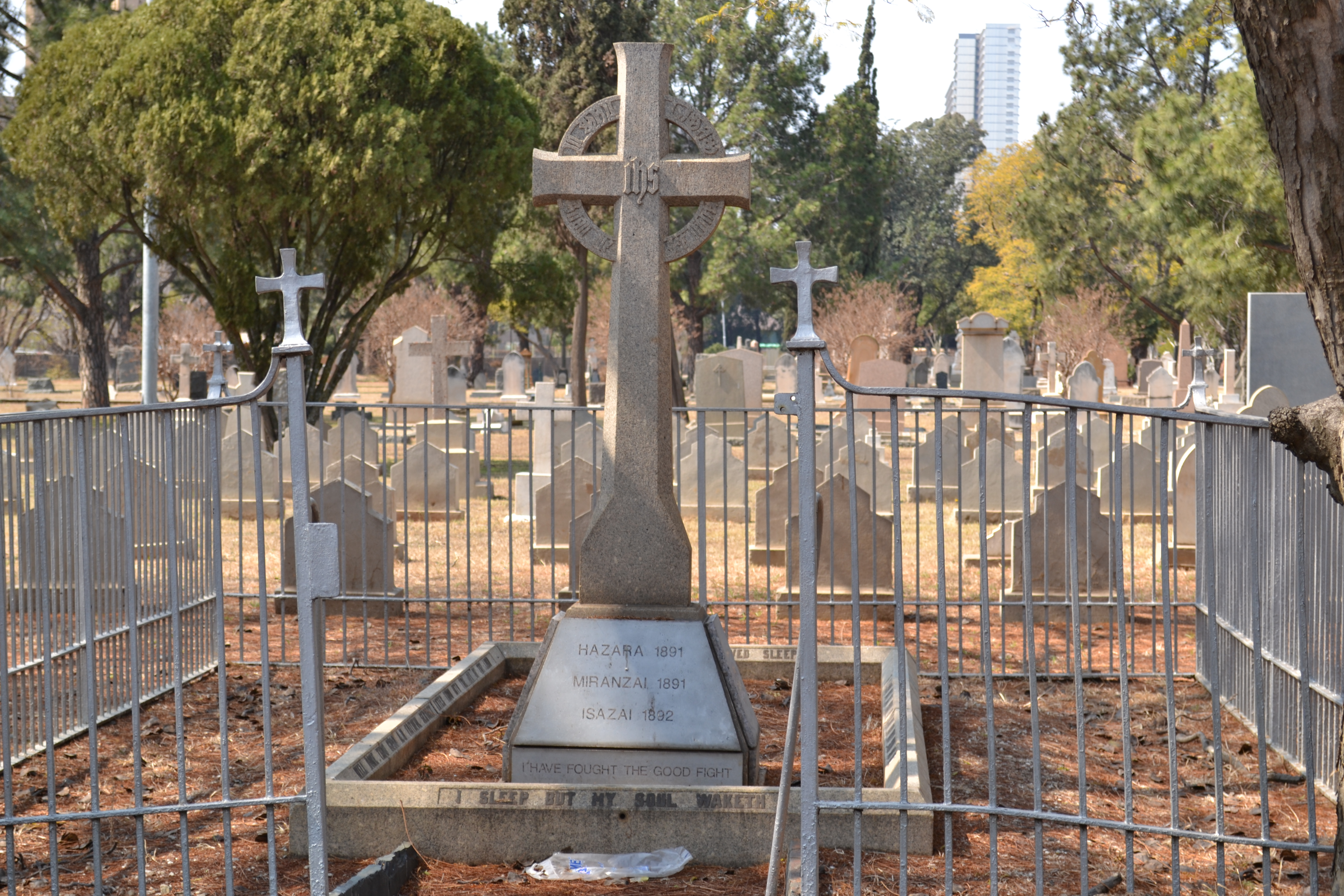
Grave of Prince Christian Victor in Pretoria

In October 1900, while in Pretoria, Christian Victor came down with malaria, and died of enteric fever, on 29 October, aged 33, after receiving Holy Communion in the presence of Lord Roberts and Prince Francis of Teck. He was interred in the Pretoria cemetery on 1 November 1900. His grave is marked with a granite cross and a cast-iron railing.

Christian Victor's grandmother Queen Victoria wrote of her grandson's death in her journal:

"I went upstairs, Thora came in & in a faltering voice said "He is gone". I could not believed it, it seemed too dreadful & heart breaking, & this dear excellent, gallant Boy, beloved by all, such a good, as well as brave & capable officer, gone! To think that he had gone through the Indian campaign, Ashanti, (where our beloved Liko was taken) the Soudan, (going down in his ship) & now again in S. Africa had passed through endless hardship, & dangers, without being ill, or getting a scratch, – to fall a victim to this horrid fever, just on the eve of his return home, – oh! it is really too piteous."

— Queen Victoria, Journal, 29 October 1900

His sister, Princess Marie Louise, wrote in her memoir My Memories of Six Reigns that she was visited by the ghost of Prince Victor while at home in South Kensington, 18 months after his death. She said that he told her that he had come "to see that you were all right and happy" and that she was not to follow him downstairs. She greeted him as 'Kicky' as that was the nickname his siblings called him. He was seated with his favourite dachshund on his knee and was dressed in his army khaki. She only remembered that he had died after he had left the room.

== Legacy ==
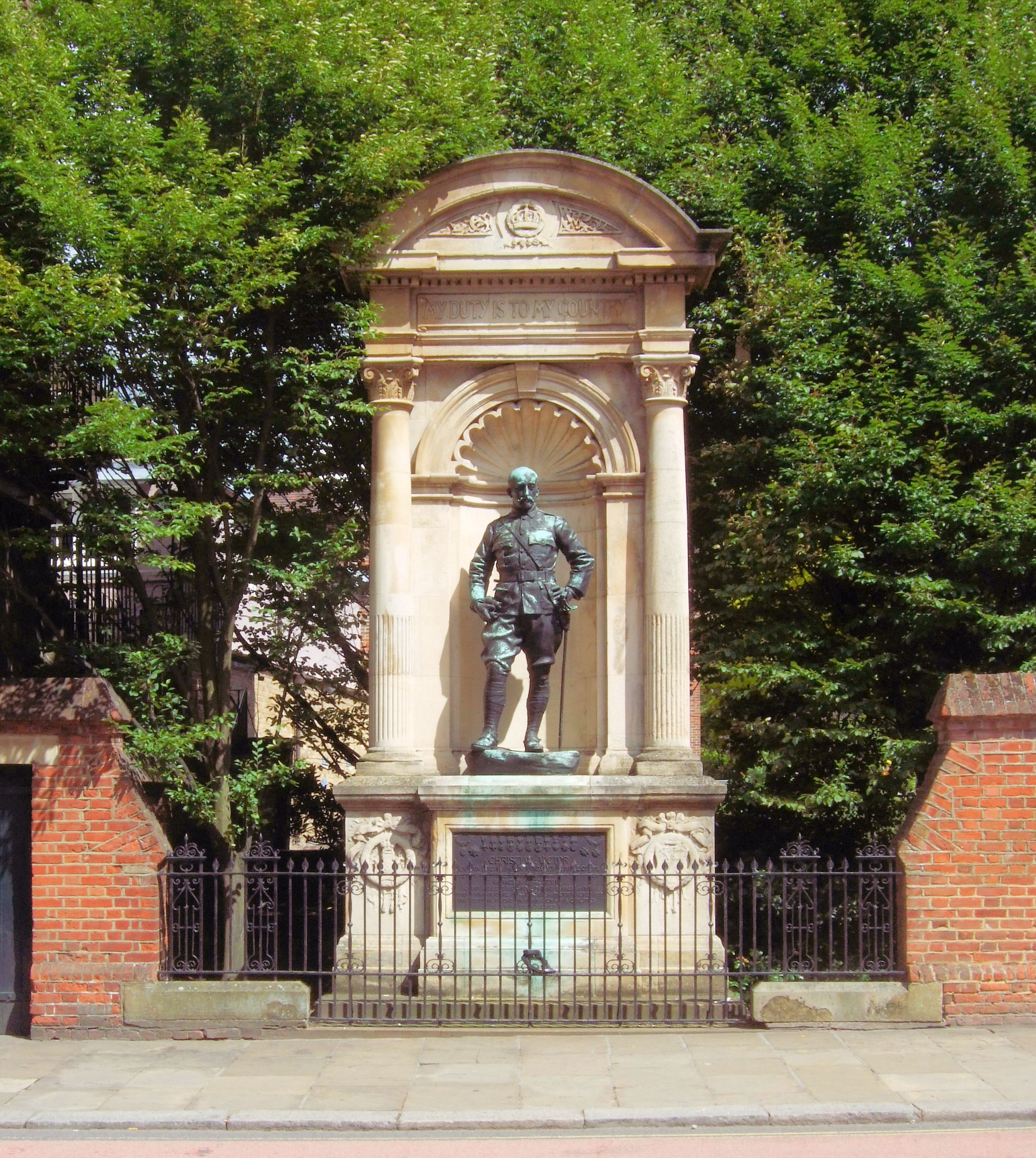
Statue outside Windsor Castle

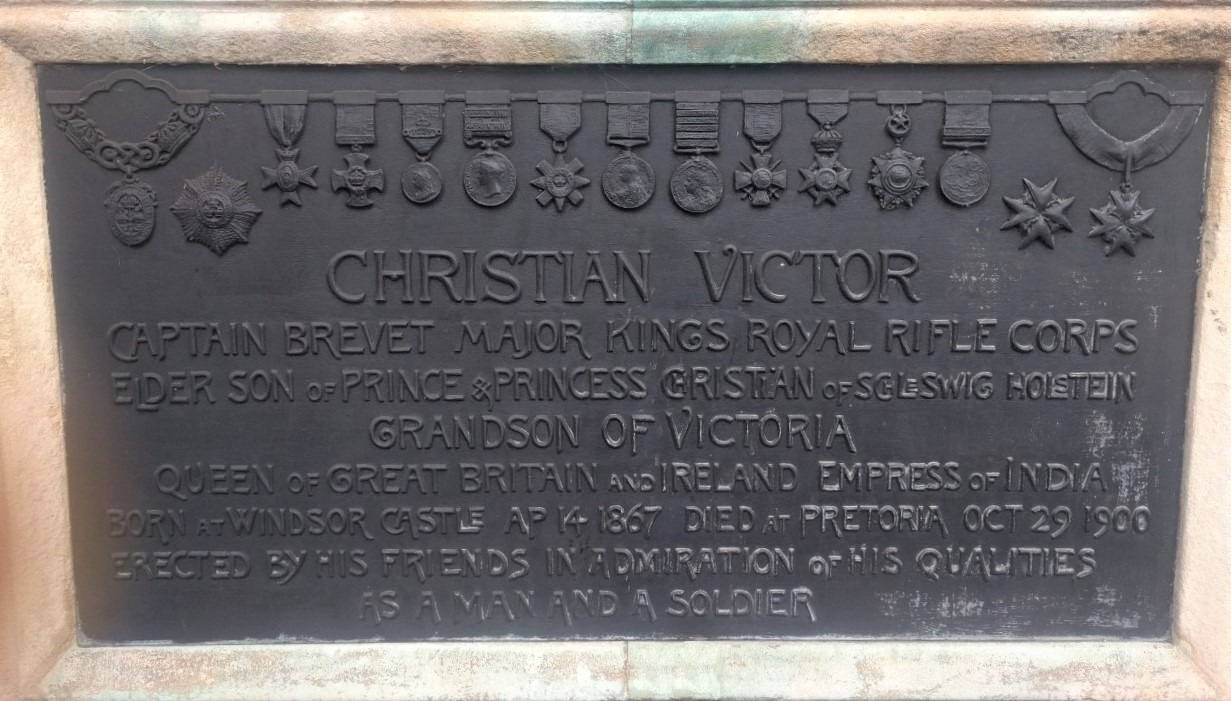
Plaque on the Windsor memorial, showing the prince's honours

There is a monument to him in the Chapel of the Crucifixion at Frogmore Mausoleum by Emil Fuchs. It was originally placed in St George's Chapel. Another monument dedicated to him also serves as a monument to the fallen officers, NCOs and Soldiers of the Devonshire, Somerset and Gloucestershire Regiments who lost their lives in the Boer War. This monument is located on Plymouth Hoe in Plymouth, outside the entrance to the Royal Citadel.

There is also a statue of Christian Victor outside Windsor Castle (Berkshire, England), erected by his friends. The accompanying plaque displays his orders and campaign medals.

His parents dedicated a window to him in the Royal Chapel of All Saints in Windsor Great Park in 1905.

T. Herbert Warren's biography of Prince Christian Victor was published by John Murray in 1903.

=== Honours ===
- United Kingdom:
  - GCB: Extra Knight Grand Cross of the Bath (civil division), 19 July 1890
  - GCVO: Knight Grand Cross of the Royal Victorian Order, 8 December 1898
  - DSO: Distinguished Service Order
  - KStJ: Knight of Justice of St. John
  - Queen Victoria Golden Jubilee Medal, with clasp for Diamond Jubilee
  - India General Service Medal (1854)
  - Ashanti Star
  - Queen's Sudan Medal
  - Queen's South Africa Medal
- Kingdom of Prussia: Knight of the Red Eagle, 1st Class, 28 July 1891; 3rd Class with Swords, 22 December 1891
- (Saxe-Coburg and Gotha) (Duchy of Saxe-Altenburg) (Saxe-Meiningen) Ernestine duchies: Grand Cross of the Saxe-Ernestine House Order
- Grand Duchy of Hesse: Grand Cross of the Ludwig Order, 1 January 1890
- Duchy of Anhalt: Grand Cross of Albert the Bear, 1891
- Ottoman Empire: Order of Osmanieh, 1st Class
- Khedivate of Egypt: Khedive's Sudan Medal

== Ancestry ==
Ancestors of Prince Christian Victor of Schleswig-Holstein

8. Frederick Christian II, Duke of Schleswig-Holstein-Sonderburg-Augustenburg
4. Christian Augustus II, Duke of Schleswig-Holstein-Sonderburg-Augustenburg
9. Princess Louise Augusta of Denmark
2. Prince Christian of Schleswig-Holstein
10. Count Christian Danneskiold-Samsøe
5. Countess Louise Danneskiold-Samsøe
11. Henriette Kaas
1. Prince Christian Victor of Schleswig-Holstein
12. Ernest I, Duke of Saxe-Coburg and Gotha
6. Prince Albert of Saxe-Coburg and Gotha
13. Princess Louise of Saxe-Gotha-Altenburg
3. Princess Helena of the United Kingdom
14. Prince Edward, Duke of Kent and Strathearn
7. Victoria, Queen of the United Kingdom
15. Princess Victoria of Saxe-Coburg-Saalfeld
