= Grethe Meyer =

Danish architect and designer

- Born: April 8, 1918; Svendborg
- Died: June 25, 2008 (aged 90)
- Education: Royal Danish Academy of Fine Arts
- Occupation: Architect
- Awards: Thorvald Bindesbøll Medal

Grethe Henriette Kjældgaard Meyer (8 April 1918 – 25 June 2008) was a Danish architect and designer. She had her own design studio from 1960 where she designed products for the home, including cutlery. Her dinnerware designs for Royal Copenhagen had a simple, timeless look. She inspired many female architects and designers, pushing open the door to gender equality in the design industry. Most productive in the late 1940s-70s, she focused not only on her pieces but on the consumers, noting that she wanted to produce high quality items that people could afford. Her work is exhibited internationally.

== Biography ==
Born on 8 April 1918 in Svendborg, she was the daughter of Peter Christian Meyer, a director, and Meta Kirstine Kjældgaard, a pianist. After matriculating from high school, she studied architecture at the Royal Danish Academy of Fine Arts where she was the only female graduate in the class of 1947.

While still at the Academy, she started to work on Bykkebogen, a manual on evolving architectural styles and decor widely used for teaching purposes (1948–70). She then worked as a researcher at the Statens Byggeforskningsinstitut (Danish Institute for Building Research) in Copenhagen from 1955-1960 before establishing her own firm in 1960.

Among her most successful designs are the Boligens Byggeskabe storage system (1954–59), named for the firm for which it was originally designed, which she developed together with Børge Mogensen, and the Stub & Stamme series of drinking glasses (Kastrup Glasværk/Holmegaard, 1958–60) in cooperation with Ibi Trier Mørch. Above all, she is remembered for her designs for the Royal Copenhagen porcelain factory, especially her Blåkant (Blue Line) faience dinner service (1965), her Hvidpot (White Pot) porcelain dinner service (1972) and her Ildpot (Fire Pot) ovenware (1976). In 1991, she designed the set of cutlery known as Copenhagen for Georg Jensen.

Meyer had an analytical eye, studying how people interacted within the home, researching eating habits and space limitations. Her influential research led the way into standardising the size of products. Keeping in mind the way people live with her pieces, she used her knowledge and research to create products that were not only beautiful, but also highly usable and practical. She strongly believed that individuals should have fewer items that they could afford but of the best quality. She used her training and knowledge of form, mass and industrial production techniques to produce pieces which were minimalist yet tactile, a characteristic of all Scandinavian design.

Meyer had her only daughter, Dorthe, in 1949. Dorthe's father was a colleague and fellow architect Bent Salicath, whom Meyer never married. Opting out on what was considered a woman’s duty at the time, she devoted her life to pursuing a career and to the constant search for functional and aesthetically simple designs. She was modern in her take on family life and her own role as a woman in a design world that was mostly ruled by men, and lived alone with her daughter. As a consequence she was forced to work even harder to fit life as an employed architect with her personal ambitions of obtaining independence as a designer.

Meyer was a member of the board of the Architects' Association of Denmark (1964–65) and of the Danish Design Council (1977).

== Notable works ==
=== Bla Kant (Blue Line), 1965 ===
Named for the fine blue line that runs along the edges of the light grey faience, this dinnerware line received the inaugural Danish Industrial Design Prize (ID) in 1965.

=== Ildpot (Firepot), 1976 ===
One of Meyer's best-selling home designs was her Ildpot, a line of earthenware dishes. They were meant to go directly from one's freezer to one's oven and then straight onto the dinner table to save time in the preparation of food and increase time spent enjoying one's company in the home. Before the 1970s, it had not been possible to produce bowls and dishes that could withstand the large temperature change when taking a dish from the freezer and putting it directly into the oven. Meyer studied and tweaked the design of the Firepot to come up with a way to use oven space optimally. The Firepot was produced in cordierite, which is a magnesium mineral with a low thermal expansion that endures great changes in environmental temperature without breaking. The pots themselves could not be glazed, but with use over time, they begin to take on an individual dark patina. Meyer was awarded with the Danish Industrial Design Prize in 1976 for the Ildpot designs.

=== GM 15 and GM 30 pendant lamps, 1984 ===
In 2004, the GM 15 and GM 30 lamps were created based on Meyer's original sketches from May 1984. 20 years after their conception, the Danish brand Menu put the Grethe Meyer Lamp into production for the first time. The GM Lamp represents classic Danish industrial design, brought to life from the sketches of one of the masters of the style.

== Awards ==
Among the many awards she received are:

- 1965: Inaugural Danish Industrial Design (ID) Prize for Blåkant, a faience dinnerware set produced by Royal Copenhagen
- 1976: Danish Industrial Design (ID) Prize for Ildpot (Firepot)
- 1983: Thorvald Bindesbøll Medal
- 1997: Danish Design Award. In her acceptance speech on the occasion of receiving the Danish Design Award (December 8, 1997), Meyer thanked Børge Mogensen, who she said had advised her: 'Go back to the beginning and start all over again if, at the back of your mind, you know that not all is right in what you are doing.'
- 2002: C.F. Hansen Medal

== Legacy ==
In the 2021 documentary film Grethe Meyer: The Queen of Danish Design, Benedikte Hansen played the role of Meyer.
