= Prince Christian of Schleswig-Holstein =

German prince and British royal (1831–1917)

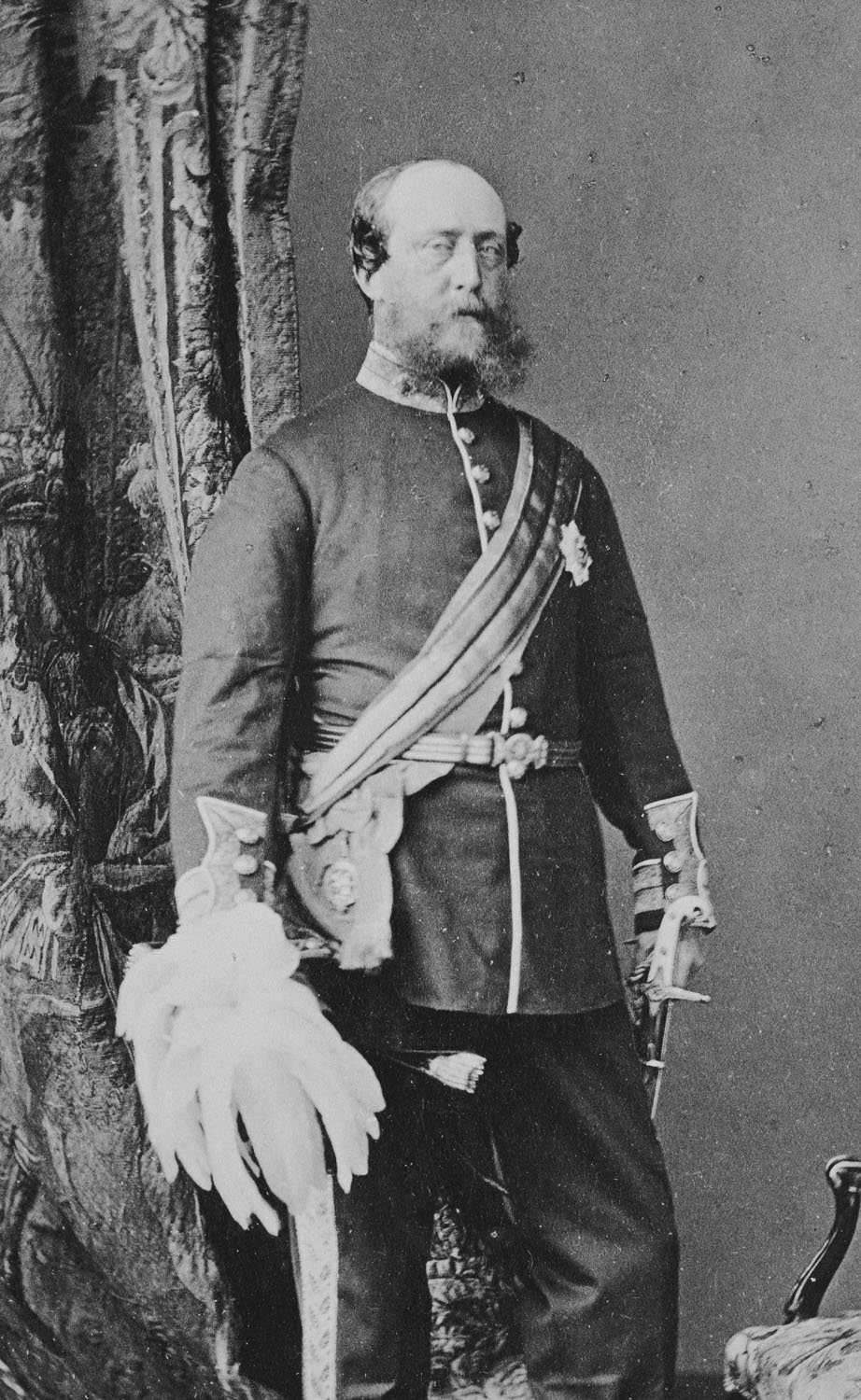
- Photograph of Prince Christian, c. 1866
- Born: 22 January 1831; Augustenborg, Denmark
- Died: 28 October 1917 (aged 86); Schomberg House, London, England
- Burial: 1 November 1917; Royal Vault, St George's Chapel, Windsor Castle; 23 October 1928; Royal Burial Ground, Frogmore
- Spouse: Princess Helena (m. 1866)
- Issue more...: Prince Christian Victor; Albert, Duke of Schleswig-Holstein; Princess Helena Victoria; Princess Marie Louise; Prince Harald
Names
- Frederick Christian Charles Augustus
- House: Schleswig-Holstein-Sonderburg-Augustenburg
- Father: Christian August II, Duke of Schleswig-Holstein-Sonderburg-Augustenburg
- Mother: Countess Louise Sophie Danneskiold-Samsøe

Prince Christian of Schleswig-Holstein (Frederick Christian Charles Augustus; 22 January 1831 – 28 October 1917) was a German prince who became a member of the British royal family through his marriage to Princess Helena of the United Kingdom, the fifth child and third daughter of Queen Victoria and Prince Albert of Saxe-Coburg and Gotha.

== Early life ==
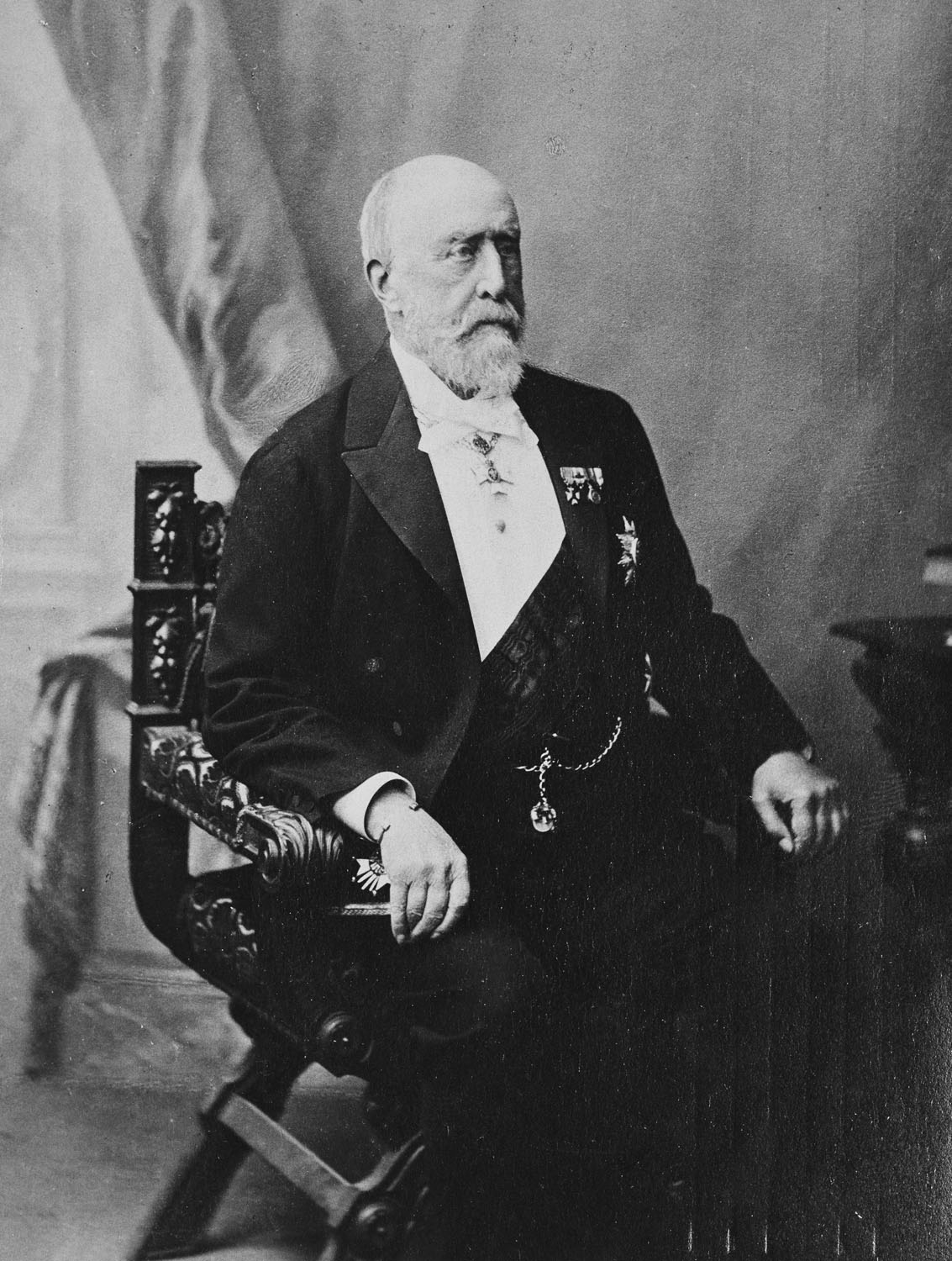
Prince Christian, c. 1909

Christian was born at Augustenburg Palace, as the second son of Christian August II, Duke of Schleswig-Holstein-Sonderburg-Augustenburg and his wife, Countess Louise Sophie of Danneskiold-Samsøe.

In 1848, young Christian's father, Duke Christian August, placed himself at the head of a movement to resist by force the claims of Denmark upon the Duchies of Schleswig and Holstein, two personal possessions of the kings of Denmark, of which Holstein also was a part of the German Confederation. A year earlier, King Frederick VII acceded to the Danish throne without any hope of producing a male heir. Unlike Denmark proper, where the Lex Regia of 1665 allowed the throne to pass through the female royal line, in Holstein Salic Law prevailed. The duchy would most likely revert to the line of Schleswig-Holstein-Sonderburg-Augustenburg, the cadet branch of the House of Holstein-Sonderburg. During the 1852 First War of Schleswig, Prince Christian briefly served with the newly constituted Schleswig-Holstein army, before he and his family were forced to flee the advancing Danish forces (see history of Schleswig-Holstein). After the war, he attended the University of Bonn, where he befriended Crown Prince Frederick William of Prussia (later the German Emperor Frederick III).

== Marriage ==
In September 1865, while visiting Coburg, Princess Helena met Christian. The couple became engaged in December of that year. Queen Victoria gave her permission for the marriage with the provision that the couple live in Great Britain. They married at the Private Chapel at Windsor Castle on 5 July 1866. Seven days before the wedding, on 29 June 1866, the Queen granted her future son-in-law the style of Royal Highness by Royal Warrant.

In 1891, Christian lost an eye when he was accidentally shot in the face by his brother-in-law, the Duke of Connaught, during a shooting party at Sandringham.

Prince and Princess Christian of Schleswig-Holstein, as they were known, made their home at Frogmore House in the grounds of Windsor Castle and later at Cumberland Lodge in Windsor Great Park. They had six children, known commonly as:

- Prince Christian Victor (14 April 1867 – 29 October 1900); never married; died young during military duty and was buried in South Africa.
- Prince Albert (28 February 1869 – 27 April 1931) who in 1921 became the titular Duke of Schleswig-Holstein and the Head of the House of Oldenburg. Never married; but had an illegitimate daughter:
  - Valerie Marie zu Schleswig-Holstein (3 April 1900 – 14 Aug 1953). Married firstly Ernst Johann Wagner (b. 10 Jan 1896); married secondly Engelbert-Charles, 16th Duke of Aarschot and 10th Duke of Arenberg (20 April 1899 – 27 April 1974), Head of the (formerly Sovereign) House of Arenberg
- Princess Helena Victoria (3 May 1870 – 13 March 1948); never married.
- Princess Marie Louise (12 August 1872 – 8 December 1956); married in 1891 Prince Aribert of Anhalt, regent of the Duchy of Anhalt, no issue, marriage annulled in 1900.
- Prince Harald (12 May 1876 – 20 May 1876).
- Unnamed stillborn son (7 May 1877).

== Honours and arms ==
Coat of Arms of Prince Christian

- United Kingdom:
  - KG: Knight Companion of the Garter, 9 July 1866
  - PC: Privy Councillor, 7 August 1894
  - ADC: Personal Aide-de-Camp to the Sovereign, 14 March 1898
  - GCVO: Knight Grand Cross of the Royal Victorian Order, 22 January 1901
  - KStJ: Knight of Justice of St. John
  - Recipient of the Royal Victorian Chain, 10 August 1902
- Duchy of Anhalt: Grand Cross of Albert the Bear, 1890
- Baden:
  - Knight of the House Order of Fidelity, 1880
  - Knight of the Order of Berthold the First, 1880
- Kingdom of Bavaria: Knight of St. Hubert, 1880
- Belgium: Grand Cordon of the Order of Leopold
- (Saxe-Coburg and Gotha) (Duchy of Saxe-Altenburg) (Saxe-Meiningen) Ernestine duchies: Grand Cross of the Saxe-Ernestine House Order, 1861
- Grand Duchy of Hesse: Grand Cross of the Ludwig Order, 12 April 1872
- Netherlands: Grand Cross of the Netherlands Lion
- Norway: Grand Cross of St. Olav, with Collar, 13 November 1906
- Kingdom of Prussia:
  - Knight of the Black Eagle, 10 March 1881; with Collar, 1882
  - Grand Commander's Cross of the Royal House Order of Hohenzollern, 28 July 1891
- Kingdom of Romania: Grand Cross of the Star of Romania
- Kingdom of Saxony: Knight of the Rue Crown, 1872
- Sweden: Knight of the Seraphim, 18 September 1897

=== Military and civil appointments ===
Prince Christian was given the rank of major general in the British Army in July 1866 and received promotions to the ranks of lieutenant general in August 1874 and general in October 1877. From 1869 until his death, he was honorary colonel of the 1st Volunteer Battalion, The Royal Berkshire Regiment. However, he never held a major field command or staff position. He was High Steward of Windsor and Ranger of Windsor Great Park, and was awarded a Doctor of Civil Law degree by the University of Oxford.

He received the freedom of the city of Carlisle on 7 July 1902, during a visit to the city for the Royal Agricultural Society's Show. As a "Minor Royal", he officiated at many public functions. These included participation, with the Princess Helena, in the speech day of Malvern College in 1870.

== Unpopularity ==
Christian has the following written description:

"A London correspondent of a New York daily paper comments rather frankly on the unpopularity of Prince Christian in England. " Prince Christian he says, " married the English Princess Helena, and the people, by a sort of instinct, came to the conclusion that the young lady had been forced into the marriage, and that the whole business was a 'shame.' Since that time Prince Christian has been growing more and more unpopular, not on account of anything he has done so much as because he is disliked. The other day the prince went with his wife and some of the royal family to Liverpool, and the people who waited outside hissed him, but cheered all the rest. The affair was hushed up but there is reason to believe that it caused some little sensation at Windsor. The photographs of the prince have been partly the cause of his unpopularity. He is a churlish looking man, with a very bald head, and the bald head has, I fear, done this business. The Princess Helena was only 19 when she married, and the English people (who like the royal ladies especially) were not satisfied, and thought her husband not good enough for her. Then, again, the prince of the bald head was unquestionably one of the very smallest of the very small Germans who have been strapped on to the shoulders of the patient and cloudily-witted John Bull. He had, before he came over here, a revenue from his immense income of £200 a year. This enormous income was not enough to get married upon, and very glad he must have been to catch one of the Queen's daughters, and to be taken into comfortable lodgings in the house of the aforesaid John Bull. The next thing, of course, was to make an income for this rather farcical prince. Some very ugly stories are in circulation, most of them probably untrue, but they helped to make people dislike him. Nevertheless Parliament voted him a grant of £30,000 (as a dower to his wife and £6000 a year. imagine what a change for a poor devil to be taken from the midst of debt and poverty to live in one of the Queen's palaces and have a large income given to him, upon no harder condition than that he should marry a well educated and rather pretty girl ! But things do not always go smoothly with Prince Christian. As I have said he was loudly hissed in the public streets the other day, and now this week a stinging caricature has been leveled at him in the Tomdliawk, a paper which is making wonderful progress in-consequence of the boldness and freedom of its cartoons. We are shown an unpleasant little man perched on the back of the British lion and tugging away at his mane. Underneath is written ' Set a beggar on Horseback, or Translated from the German. This will not please the family circle at Osborne for Windsor. I fancy Prince Christian has rather a bad time before him. The Queen is understood to insist upon his residing in this country, and under her own eye apparently with a due regard for the protection of her daughter. A man ought to behave properly on £6000 a year, seeing that he has done nothing to merit a farthing. There are Englishmen (would you believe it?) of better and nobler descent than this very little German, and of handsome private means and station, who would be too happy to make good husbands of any of the royal princesses (except those who are already married, pray understand). But no that would not do. A seedy gentleman, all out at elbows, from Faderlaud, is the only eligible person. The inevitable consequence of such a system is Prince Christian."

== Later life and death ==
In July 1916, Prince and Princess Christian of Schleswig-Holstein celebrated their golden wedding anniversary, receiving numerous messages of congratulations from the royal family and the people of Windsor, where Christian served as High Steward. Among the well-wishers was Emperor Wilhelm II, who sent a telegram through Crown Princess Margaret of Sweden conveying his good wishes despite the wartime context.

During the First World War, anti-German sentiment led King George V to rename the royal house from Saxe-Coburg and Gotha to Windsor in 1917, and associated families, including the Battenbergs and Schleswig-Holsteins, anglicised or discontinued their German titles. Christian died shortly thereafter at Schomberg House in October 1917, aged 86. His final recorded words to King George, reportedly referring to the Battle of Caporetto, were: "George, what about those damned Italians?" After being initially interred in the Royal Vault at St George's Chapel, Windsor Castle, he was buried at the Royal Burial Ground, Frogmore in Windsor Great Park.

== Ancestry ==
Ancestors of Prince Christian of Schleswig-Holstein

8. Frederick Christian I, Duke of Schleswig-Holstein-Sonderburg-Augustenburg
4. Frederick Christian II, Duke of Schleswig-Holstein-Sonderburg-Augustenburg
9. Princess Charlotte Amalie Wilhelmine of Schleswig-Holstein-Sonderburg-Plön
2. Christian Augustus II, Duke of Schleswig-Holstein-Sonderburg-Augustenburg
10. Christian VII of Denmark
5. Princess Louise Augusta of Denmark
11. Princess Caroline Matilda of Great Britain
1. Prince Christian of Schleswig-Holstein
12. Count Frederik Christian Danneskiold-Samsøe
6. Count Christian Danneskiold-Samsøe
13. Friederike Louise von Kleist
3. Countess Louise Danneskiold-Samsøe
14. Frederik Christian Kaas
7. Henriette Kaas
15. Edele Sophie Kaas
