= Princess Helena Victoria of Schleswig-Holstein =

British princess (1870–1948)

Princess Helena Victoria
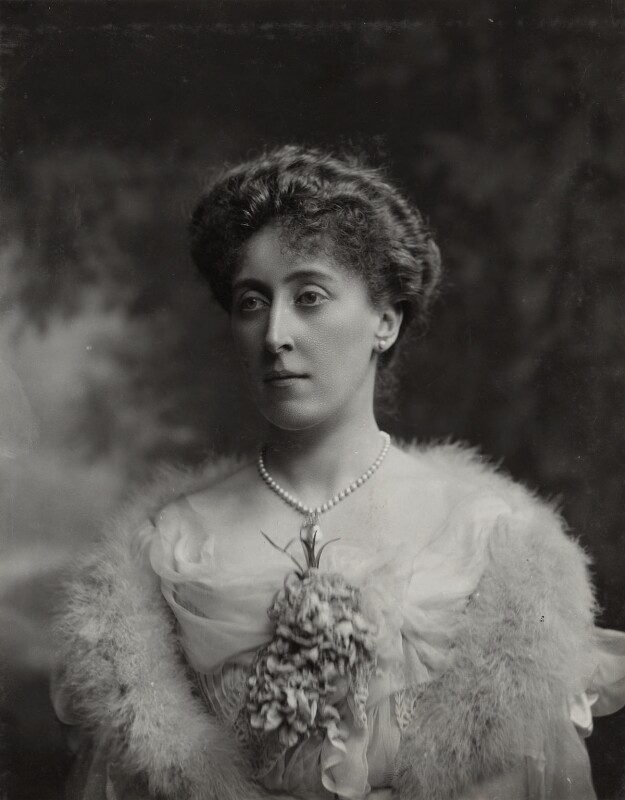
- Photograph, c. 1910
- Born: 3 May 1870; Frogmore House, Windsor, England
- Died: 13 March 1948 (aged 77); Berkeley Square, London
- Burial: 17 March 1948; St George's Chapel, Windsor Castle; 22 June 1948; Royal Burial Ground, Frogmore
Names
- Victoria Louise Sophia Augusta Amelia Helena
- House: Schleswig-Holstein-Sonderburg-Augustenburg
- Father: Prince Christian of Schleswig-Holstein
- Mother: Princess Helena of the United Kingdom

Princess Helena Victoria of Schleswig-Holstein (Victoria Louise Sophia Augusta Amelia Helena; 3 May 1870 – 13 March 1948), informally known by her family as Thora, was a granddaughter of Queen Victoria of the United Kingdom. From July 1917, she was addressed simply as Princess Helena Victoria.

== Early life ==
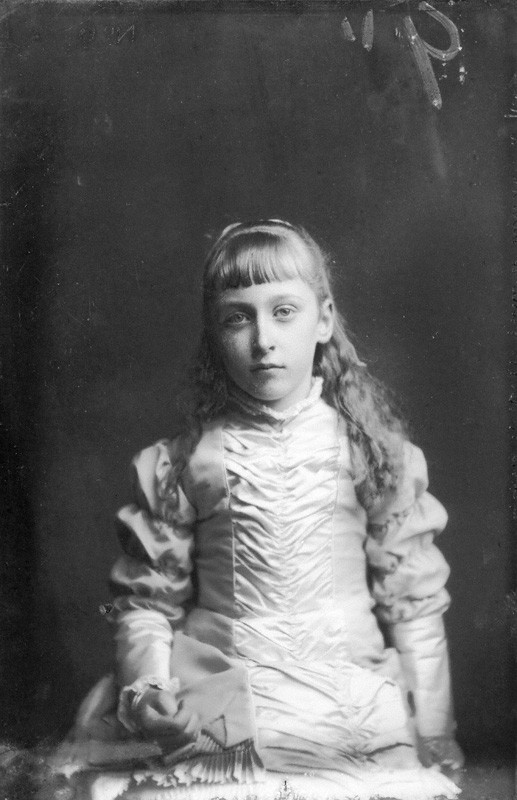
Late 1880s portrait of the young princess

Helena Victoria (always known to her family as Thora) was born on 3 May 1870 at Frogmore House, near Windsor Castle. Her father was Prince Christian of Schleswig-Holstein-Sonderburg-Augustenburg, the third son of Christian, Duke of Augustenburg and his wife, Countess Louise Sophie of Danneskiold-Samsøe. Her mother was Princess Helena, the fifth child and third daughter of Queen Victoria and Prince Albert of Saxe-Coburg and Gotha. After their marriage, her parents resided in Cumberland Lodge, Great Britain.

She was baptised in the private chapel at Windsor Castle on 20 June 1870. Her godparents were Queen Victoria, the Duchess of Cambridge, Princess Louise, Prince Arthur, Prince Leopold, Prince Valdemar of Denmark, Prince Edward of Saxe-Weimar, Princess Louise Auguste of Schleswig-Holstein and Princess Caroline Amelie of Schleswig-Holstein (the latter two represented by the Duchess of Roxburghe).

She was a bridesmaid at the 1885 wedding of her maternal aunt Princess Beatrice to Prince Henry of Battenberg and also at the wedding of her cousins the Duke and Duchess of York (future George V and Queen Mary) in 1893.

She spent most of her childhood at Cumberland Lodge, her father's residence as Ranger of Windsor Great Park. Known to her family as "Thora", or sometimes "the Snipe", in reference to her sharp facial features, formally she used the names Helena Victoria from among her string of six given names.

== First World War ==
In July 1917, King George V changed the name of the British royal family to the House of Windsor. He also relinquished, on behalf of himself and his numerous cousins who were British subjects, the use of their German titles, styles, and surnames. Helena Victoria and her younger sister, Princess Marie Louise, thereupon ceased to use the territorial designation "of Schleswig-Holstein-Sonderburg-Augustenburg".

Instead, they became known simply as "Her Highness Princess Helena Victoria" and "Her Highness Princess Marie Louise". Although the two had officially borne German titles, their upbringing and domicile were entirely English.

== Later life and death ==
Helena Victoria never married. She followed her mother's example in working for various charitable organizations, most notably YMCA, Young Women's Christian Association (YWCA) and Princess Christian's Nursing Home at Windsor. During World War I, she founded the YWCA Women's Auxiliary Force. As its president, she visited British troops in France and obtained the permission of the Secretary of State for War, Lord Kitchener, to arrange entertainments for them. Between the world wars, she and her sister, Princess Marie Louise, were enthusiastic patrons of music at Schomberg House, their London residence. It was reported in one publication in 1924 that 'Princess Helena Victoria has always been, together with her sister Princess Marie Louise, one of the hardest working of all our princesses.' After a German air raid damaged the house in 1940, the two princesses moved to Fitzmaurice Place, Berkeley Square.

In ill health and a wheelchair user after World War II, Helena Victoria made one of her last major appearances at the 20 November 1947 wedding of her first cousin, twice removed, Princess Elizabeth, to Prince Philip of Greece and Denmark.

Helena Victoria died at Fitzmaurice Place, Berkeley Square, on 13 March 1948, aged 77. No orders for court mourning were issued: but the King and Queen, and members of their Households, mourned for one week. Probate of the Princess's estate was granted in London on 20 May 1948 and it was valued at £52,435 (£1.3 million at 2022 conversion rates).

=== Funeral ===
Her funeral took place at St. George's Chapel, Windsor on Wednesday 17 March 1948 at 11:30 am. Her coffin was draped in the Union Jack with a wreath of daffodils and spring flowers from her sister Princess Marie Louise and a wreath of yellow roses and mauve tulips from King George VI and Queen Elizabeth. Amongst the mourners were her sister Marie Louise, George VI, Queen Elizabeth, Princess Elizabeth and the Duke of Edinburgh, Queen Mary's representative Lord Claud Hamilton, Princess Alice, Duchess of Gloucester, Princess Marina, Duchess of Kent, Alexander Mountbatten, 1st Marquess of Carisbrooke, David Mountbatten, 3rd Marquess of Milford Haven, and Lady Patricia Ramsay and her son Captain Alexander Ramsay. Music included Walford Davies's setting of Psalm 121 ('I will lift up mine eyes'), his God Be In My Head, and the hymn 'Rock of Ages'. Her coffin was later buried at the Royal Burial Ground, Frogmore, Windsor Great Park.

== Titles, styles, honours and arms ==
=== Titles and styles ===
- 3 May 1870 – 14 July 1917: Her Highness Princess Victoria of Schleswig-Holstein
- 14 July 1917 – 13 March 1948: Her Highness Princess Helena Victoria

In May 1866, Queen Victoria had conferred the higher style of Highness upon any children to be born of the marriage of Princess Helena and Prince Christian, although the children were to remain Prince or Princess of Schleswig-Holstein. This higher style was valid only in the British realms and territories. Whithin the German Empire, as a male-line granddaughter of the Duke of Schleswig-Holstein, Princess Helena Victoria would have been styled Serene Highness (Durchlaucht).

In June 1917, a notice appeared in the Court Circular that a Royal Warrant was to be prepared by George V dispensing with his cousins' use of the "Schleswig-Holstein-Sonderburg-Augustenburg" part of their titles. However no warrant was issued, nor were they formally granted the titles of Princesses of Great Britain and Ireland nor of the United Kingdom.

=== Honours ===
British honours

- VA: Lady of the Order of Victoria and Albert, 1883
- CI: Companion of the Order of the Crown of India, 25 May 1889
- RRC: Decoration of the Royal Red Cross, 16 March 1900
- GBE: Dame Grand Cross of the Order of the British Empire, 1918
- GCStJ: Dame Grand Cross of the Order of St John, 1928

Foreign honours

- (Restoration (Spain)) Dame of the Royal Order of Queen Maria Luisa

== Ancestry ==
Ancestors of Princess Helena Victoria of Schleswig-Holstein

8. Frederick Christian II, Duke of Schleswig-Holstein-Sonderburg-Augustenburg
4. Christian Augustus II, Duke of Schleswig-Holstein-Sonderburg-Augustenburg
9. Princess Louise Augusta of Denmark
2. Prince Christian of Schleswig-Holstein
10. Count Christian Danneskiold-Samsøe
5. Countess Louise Danneskiold-Samsøe
11. Henriette Kaas
1. Princess Helena Victoria of Schleswig-Holstein
12. Ernest I, Duke of Saxe-Coburg and Gotha
6. Prince Albert of Saxe-Coburg and Gotha
13. Princess Louise of Saxe-Gotha-Altenburg
3. Princess Helena of the United Kingdom
14. Prince Edward, Duke of Kent and Strathearn
7. Victoria, Queen of the United Kingdom
15. Princess Victoria of Saxe-Coburg-Saalfeld

== Sources ==
- Ronald Allison and Sarah Riddell, eds., The Royal Encyclopedia (London: Macmillan, 1992).
- "Obituary: Princess Helena Victoria, Charity and Social Services," 15 March 1948, p. 7.
- "Royal Titles: German Names Dropped, British Peerages for Princes," The Times 20 July 1917, p. 7.
