= Porcelænsfabrikken Danmark =

Porcelænsfabrikken Danmark, now also known as Lyngby Porcelæn, was a Danish porcelain manufacturer in Kongens Lyngby, Greater Copenhagen, Denmark. The factory was founded in 1936 and closed in 1969 but was relaunched as a brand in 2012. The revived brand has since 2016 been owned by Rosendahl Design Group.

== History ==
The Aarhus-based wholesale company Holst & Knudsen (founded 1904) was a leading Danish supplier of porcelain to hardware stores across the country. The porcelain was imported from leading manufacturers in central Europe. After a while the company began to import undecorated porcelain and had it then decorated at subcontractors. One of these subcontractors was Kjøbenhavns Porcellains Maleri which was taken over by Holst & Knudsen in 1924. In the early 1930s, foreign exchange controls almost stopped the import of the cheap German porcelain. These events caused Holst & Knudsen to establish their own production of porcelain. Porcelænsfabrikken Danmark was therefore established by the company in a former sugar refinery close to Lyngby railway station in 1936. The factory was led by dr.techn. Søren Berg. Porcelænsfabrikken Danmark was at the peak of its production responsible for the production of one third of all Danish porcelain. The Dan-ild series was introduced in the mid-1950s. Ceramist Axel Brüel worked as an artistic consultant for the company in the 1950s and 1960s. The factory closed in 1969 and its buildings have later been demolished.

== Revival of the brand ==
Christian Elving from Karakter registered the tradenames "Porcelænsfabriken Danmark" and "Lyngby Porcelæn" in 2011 and bought all rights and renderings from the old company in 2012. The new company subsequently began to relaunch many of the original Porcelænsfabrikken Danmark designs as well as introducing new designs under the same brand. Rosendahl Design Group purchased Lyngby Porcelæn from Karakter in 2016.
