= Princess Marie Louise of Schleswig-Holstein =

Princess Aribert of Anhalt (1872–1956)

Princess Marie Louise
- Princess Aribert of Anhalt
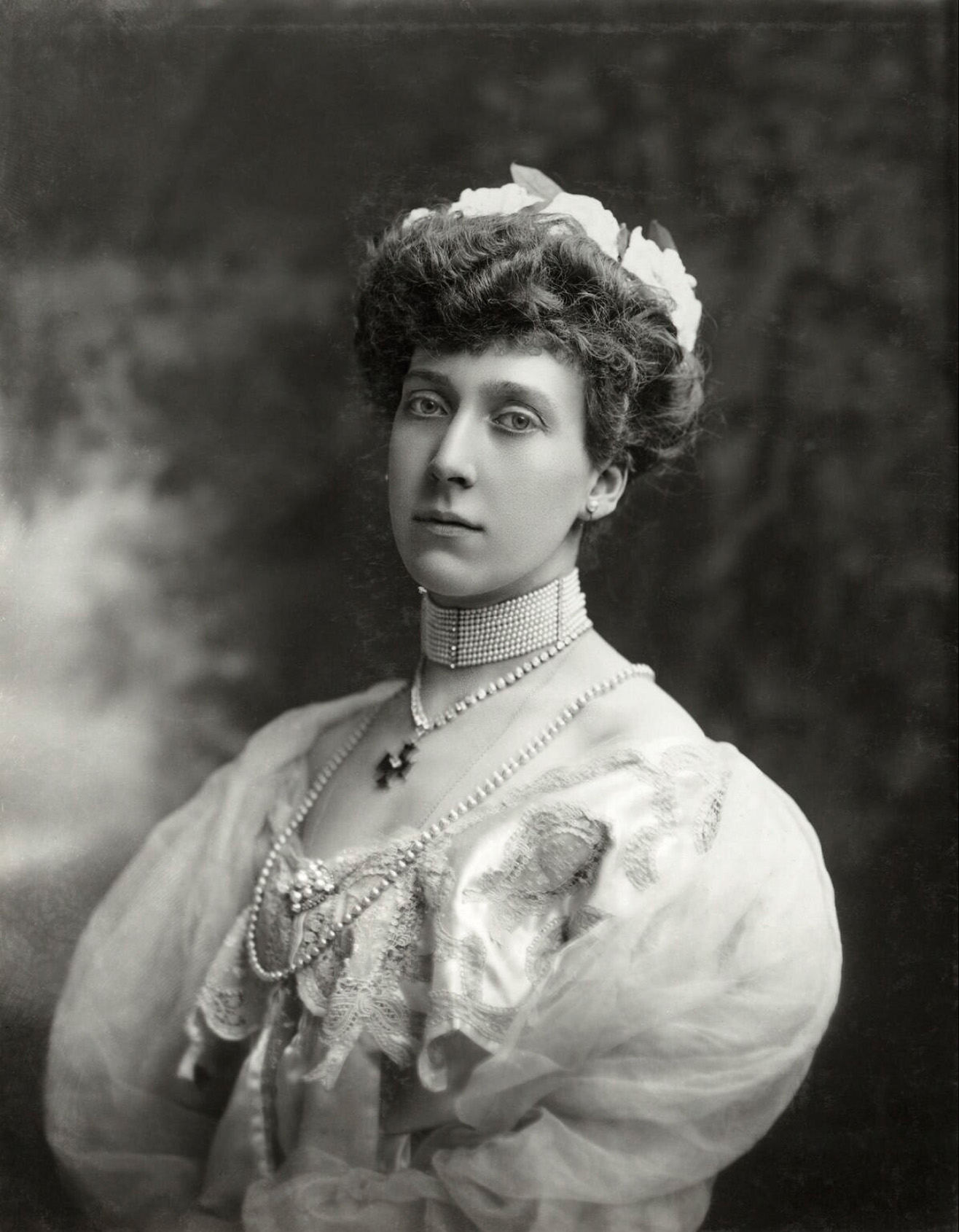
- Portrait by James Lafayette, c. 1910–1915
- Born: 12 August 1872; Cumberland Lodge, Old Windsor, Berkshire, England
- Died: 8 December 1956 (aged 84); Berkeley Square, London, England
- Burial: 14 December 1956; Royal Vault, St George's Chapel, Windsor Castle; 3 April 1957; Royal Burial Ground, Frogmore
- Spouse: Prince Aribert of Anhalt (m. 1891; ann. 1900)
Names
- Franziska Josepha Louise Augusta Marie Christina Helena
- Father: Prince Christian of Schleswig-Holstein
- Mother: Princess Helena of the United Kingdom

Princess Marie Louise of Schleswig-Holstein (Franziska Josepha Louise Augusta Marie Christina Helena; 12 August 1872 – 8 December 1956) was a granddaughter of Queen Victoria.

== Early life ==
Marie Louise was born on 12 August 1872 at Cumberland Lodge in Windsor Great Park. By birth, she was member of the House of Schleswig-Holstein-Sonderburg-Augustenburg. Her father was Prince Christian of Schleswig-Holstein-Sonderburg-Augustenburg, the third son of Duke Christian of Schleswig-Holstein-Sonderburg-Augustenburg and Countess Louise of Danneskjold-Samsøe. Her mother was Princess Helena of the United Kingdom, the fifth child and third daughter of Queen Victoria and Prince Albert of Saxe-Coburg and Gotha. She was baptised on 18 September 1872. Her godparents were Emperor Franz Joseph of Austria and Queen Marie of Hanover.

Her parents resided in the United Kingdom, and the Princess was considered a member of the British royal family. Under Royal Warrant of 15 May 1867, the children of Prince and Princess Christian were to be styled "Highness". From her birth in 1872 therefore Princess Marie Louise was styled Her Highness Princess Marie Louise of Schleswig-Holstein, albeit only in the United Kingdom. She was known to her family as "Louie".

She was a bridesmaid at the 1885 wedding of her maternal aunt Princess Beatrice, to Prince Henry of Battenberg.

== Marriage ==
On 6 July 1891, Marie Louise married Prince Aribert of Anhalt (18 June 1866 – 24 December 1933) at St George's Chapel in Windsor Castle. Aribert was the fourth son of Frederick I, Duke of Anhalt, and his wife, Princess Antoinette of Saxe-Altenburg. The bride's first cousin, the German Emperor Wilhelm II, had been instrumental in arranging the match.

Though contemporary sources did not directly suggest it was a cause of his marriage dissolution, a number of contemporaries and subsequent historical accounts suggest Aribert was bisexual or homosexual, and some have suggested an indiscretion with a male attendant was the catalyst for the dissolution and that the marriage had never been consummated. The marriage was annulled on 13 December 1900 by his father. Marie Louise, on an official visit to Canada at the time, immediately returned to Britain. According to her memoirs, she regarded her marriage vows as binding, so she never remarried.

== Activities, charity and patronages ==
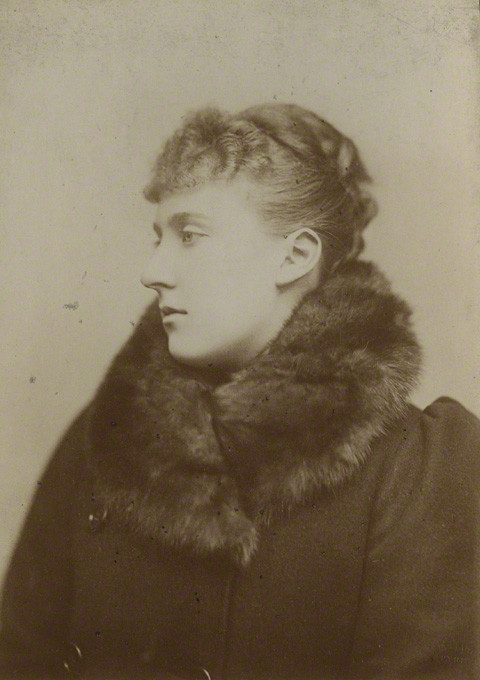
Princess Marie Louise in the 1890s

After the annulment, Marie Louise devoted herself to charitable organisations and patronage of the arts. She inspired the creation of Queen Mary's Dolls' House to showcase the work of British craftsmen. She established the Girl's Club in Bermondsey that served as a hospital during World War I. She was also active in the work of the Princess Christian Nursing Home at Windsor. She took part in all official occasions of the royal family, including coronations and funerals and processed as a Princess of the Blood Royal at events such as the coronation of George VI and the carriage procession for Princesses of the Blood Royal at the coronation of Elizabeth II.

== World War I ==
In July 1917, when George V changed the name of the British Royal House from the House of Saxe-Coburg-Gotha to House of Windsor, he also ordered his numerous cousins and in-laws, who were British subjects, to discontinue the use of their German titles, styles, and surnames. Never taking other titles or surnames, Marie Louise and her unmarried sister, Princess Helena Victoria, became known simply as "Her Highness Princess Marie Louise" and "Her Highness Princess Helena Victoria", giving them the odd distinction of being princesses but not, apparently, members of any particular royal family. This approach differed from the one accepted by George V's other relatives, who relinquished all princely titles, not just their German designations, and in turn received British titles of nobility from the King. Their titles of Princess were derived from their father, and they were not officially princesses of the United Kingdom. However, their unmarried status and their right to be styled Highness dating from Queen Victoria's concession of 1867 rendered their situations awkward, so that it was easier to allow them to retain their status as princesses while avoiding the question of immediate family membership altogether.

== Later life ==
Marie Louise became a godmother of Prince Richard of Gloucester in 1944. She was called "Cousin Louie" by the young Princess Elizabeth, and attended her wedding alongside her sister, Princess Helena Victoria. She attended four coronations in Westminster Abbey, those of King Edward VII and Queen Alexandra in 1902; King George V and Queen Mary in 1911; King George VI and Queen Elizabeth in 1937; and Queen Elizabeth II in 1953. In 1956, she published her memoirs, My Memories of Six Reigns. She died at her London home, 10 Fitzmaurice Place, Berkeley Square, a few months later on 8 December 1956 and is buried at the Royal Burial Ground, Frogmore at Windsor Great Park. At the time of her death, she was one of six surviving grandchildren of Queen Victoria. Probate of the Princess's estate was granted on 12 March 1957 and was valued at £107,644 (£1.8 million at 2022 conversion rates).

== Titles, styles and honours ==
=== Titles and styles ===
- 1872–1891: Her Highness Princess Marie Louise of Schleswig-Holstein
- 1891–1900: Her Highness Princess Aribert of Anhalt
- 1900–1917: Her Highness Princess Marie Louise of Schleswig-Holstein
- 1917–1956: Her Highness Princess Marie Louise

=== Honours ===
- VA: Lady of the Royal Order of Victoria and Albert, Second Class
- CI: Companion of the Order of the Crown of India (11 December 1893)
- GCVO: Dame Grand Cross of the Royal Victorian Order (1953)
- GBE: Dame Grand Cross of the Order of the British Empire (1919)
- RRC: Member of the Royal Red Cross
- Recipient of the Queen Elizabeth II Coronation Medal (2 June 1953)

== Ancestry ==
Ancestors of Princess Marie Louise of Schleswig-Holstein

8. Frederick Christian II, Duke of Schleswig-Holstein-Sonderburg-Augustenburg
4. Christian Augustus II, Duke of Schleswig-Holstein-Sonderburg-Augustenburg
9. Princess Louise Augusta of Denmark
2. Prince Christian of Schleswig-Holstein
10. Count Christian Danneskiold-Samsøe
5. Countess Louise Danneskiold-Samsøe
11. Henriette Kaas
1. Princess Marie Louise of Schleswig-Holstein
12. Ernest I of Saxe-Coburg and Gotha
6. Prince Albert of Saxe-Coburg and Gotha
13. Princess Louise of Saxe-Gotha-Altenburg
3. Princess Helena of the United Kingdom
14. Prince Edward, Duke of Kent and Strathearn
7. Queen Victoria of the United Kingdom
15. Princess Victoria of Saxe-Coburg-Saalfeld

== Sources ==
- Ronald Allison and Sarah Riddell, eds., The Royal Encyclopedia (London: Macmillan, 1992).
- Marlene A. Eilers, Queen Victoria's Descendants (New York: Atlantic International Publishing, 1987).
- Princess Marie Louise (née Princess of Schleswig-Holstein-Sonderburg-Augustenberg), My Memories of Six Reigns (London: Evans Brothers, 1956).
- "Obituary: Princess Marie Louise, Patron of Social Services," The Times 10 December 1956, p. 14.
