= Ibi Trier Mørch =

Danish architect, designer, silversmith and glazier

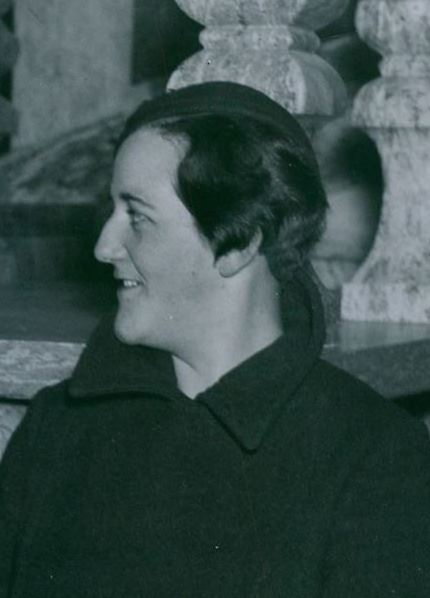
Ibi Trier Mørch (1935)

Elisabeth (Ibi) Trier Mørch (1 August 1910, Slagelse — 8 August 1980, Copenhagen) was a Danish architect and designer who is remembered in particular for her work as a silversmith and glazier. She was also active in designing lighting, textiles, ceramics and jewelry but despite her success in competitions, few of her creations were put into production. Examples of her work can be seen in the MoMA and the British Museum.

== Early life and family ==
Born on 1 August 1910 in Slgelse, Elisabeth Trier Mørch was the daughter of the builder Ejvind Mørch (1873–1962) and his wife Budrun née Trier, a furniture designer. She was the second of the family's eight children. After working in design studios in Denmark and Sweden, she chose to study architecture at the Danish School of Architecture, graduating in 1944. During her studies she established friendships with the designers Grethe Meyer and Erik Herlow.

Trier Mørch had two children, Dea (1941), a writer, and Andreas (1944–2021), an architect.

== Career ==
In addition to working as a designer, Trier Mørch was active in students' organizations and went on to help establish Selskabet for Industriel Formgivning (Society for Industrial Design) where she served as secretary for 1956 to 1964. She was also an active member of the national association of Danish Crafts (Dansk Kunsthåndværk) and contributed to the Danish journal Dansk Kunsthaandværk and the Swedish journal Form.

From 1949 to 1952, Trier Mørch designed works in silver for Anton Michelsen, in particular the six-armed candlestick Belgeslag. In 1950, she won a gold medal at the Milan Triennial for her silver saucepans which she had designed in 1951. They now form part of the MoMA collection. Together with Grethe Meyer, in 1959 she designed the Stub og Stamme stackable drinking glasses for Kastrup Glasværk. She also designed textiles, ceramics and lighting works but few were produced commercially.

Ibi Trier Mørch died in Copenhagen on 8 August 1980, aged 70.
