= Norman MacLachlan =

English cricketer and educator

Personal information
- Full name: Norman MacLachlan
- Born: 12 October 1858; Darlington, County Durham, England
- Died: 18 February 1928 (aged 69); Torquay, Devon, England
- Batting: Right-handed
- Bowling: Right-arm fast-medium

Domestic team information
- Years: Team
- 1879–1882: Oxford University

Career statistics
Competition	First-class
Matches	20
Runs scored	252
Batting average	8.40
100s/50s	–/–
Top score	27
Balls bowled	1,552
Wickets	38
Bowling average	17.76
5 wickets in innings	1
10 wickets in match	–
Best bowling	6/40
Catches/stumpings	1/–
- Source: Cricinfo, 9 June 2020

Norman MacLachlan (12 October 1858 – 18 February 1928) was an English first-class cricketer and educator.

The son of Thomas MacLachlan, he was born at Darlington in October 1858. He was educated near Edinburgh at the Loretto School, before going up to Keble College, Oxford. He played first-class cricket for Oxford University while studying there, making his debut against the Gentlemen of England in 1879. He played first-class cricket for Oxford until 1882, making twenty appearances and captaining the team in his final year. Described by the Wisden Cricketers' Almanack as a “moderate batsman, but a good fast-medium paced bowler and an active field”, MacLachlan took 38 wickets in his twenty matches at an average of 17.76, with best figures of 6 for 40, which was his only five wicket haul. With the bat, he scored 252 runs at an average of 8.40 and a high score of 27. In addition to playing cricket for Oxford, MacLachlan also played rugby as a back for Oxford University RFC.

After graduating from Oxford, MacLachlan became a schoolteacher. His first teaching post was at Aysgarth School in 1882–83, before holding the same post at Lambrook (1883–84) and at Loretto School (1884–92). In 1892, he was appointed joint-headmaster of Routenbourne Preparatory School, before being appointed the sole headmaster in July 1901. MacLachlan died at Torquay in February 1928.
