= Dea Trier Mørch =

Danish artist and writer

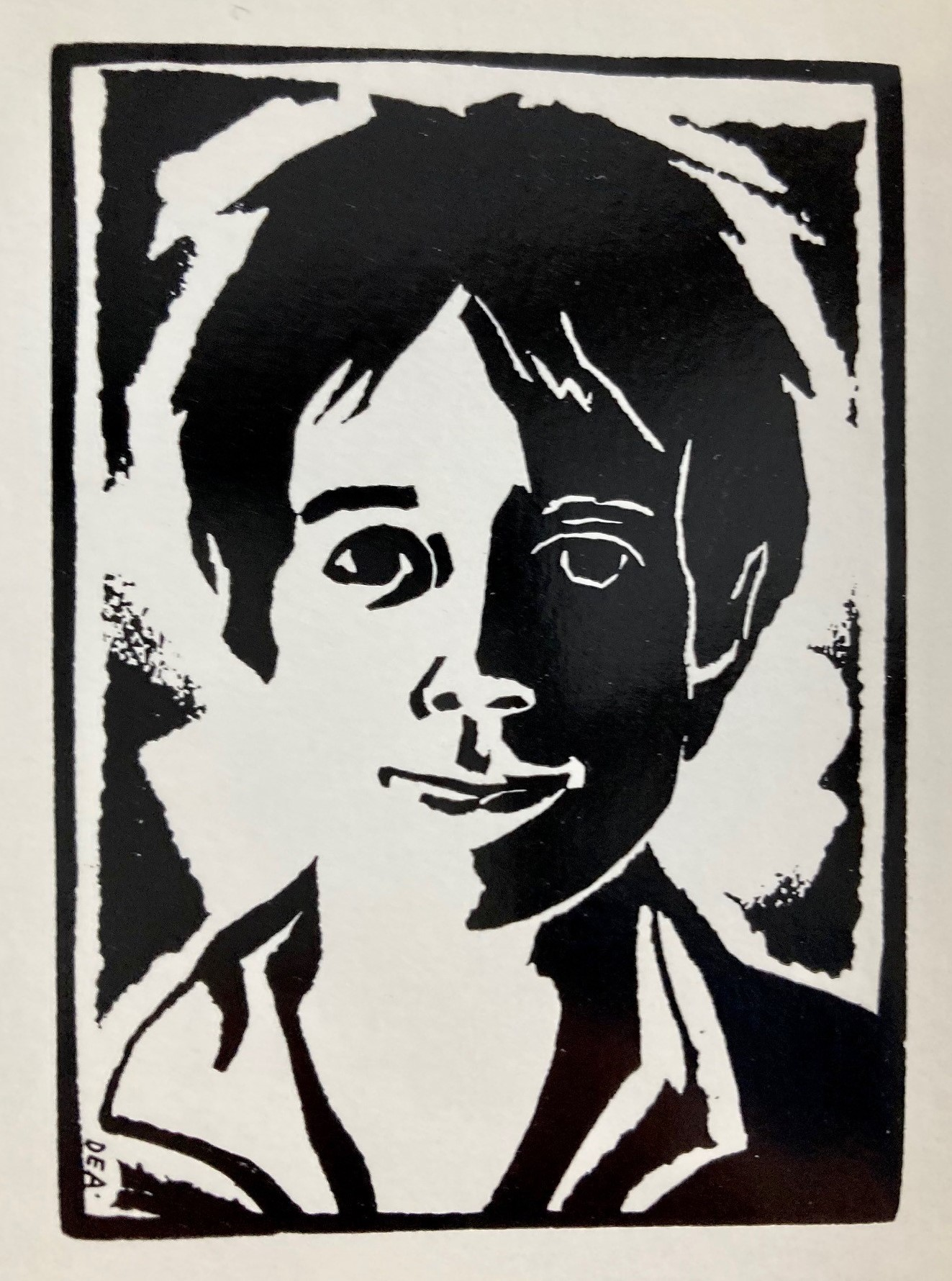
Dea Trier Mørch (linocut selv-portrait, ca. 1976)

Dea Trier Mørch (9 December 1941 – 26 May 2001) was a Danish artist and writer. She gained fame in 1976 with Vinterbørn, translated into English as Winter's Child.

== Biography ==
Born in Copenhagen, Mørch was the daughter of the architect Ibi Trier Mørch. She studied painting at the Royal Danish Academy of Fine Arts, graduating in 1964, and continued her education until 1967 at the art academies of Warsaw, Kraków, Belgrade, Leningrad and Prague. Her first book, Sorgmunter socialisme. Sovjetiske raderinger (1968), illustrated with her own etchings, gives an account of her travels to the Soviet Union. She became a member of the Danish Communist Party and, in 1969, was a co-founder of the socially oriented culture collective Røde Mor (Red Mother).

In 1976, she published Vinterbørn based on her experience of giving birth to three children in Copenhagen's Rigshospitalet. The book received wide acclaim, was translated into 22 languages and, in 1979, led to Astrid Henning-Jensen's award-winning film version. Other works dealing with family and socialism include: Den indre by (The Inner City, 1980), Aftenstjernen (1982, translated into English as Evening Star), and the love story Morgengaven (Morning Gift, 1984). Later works include: a travel book Da jeg opdagede Amerika (When I Discovered America, 1986); and Landskab i to etager (Two-Storey Landscape, 1992), involving complications in a relationship of a couple who meet later in life.

== Selected works ==
Dea Trier Mønch's published works include:

- Sorgmunter socialisme (reporting on the Soviet Union, 1968)
- Polen (travel, 1970)
- Vinterbørn (1976), translated into English as Winter's Child
- Kastaniealleen (1978)
- Den indre by (1980)
- Aftenstjernen (1982), translated into English as Evening Star
- Morgengaven (1984)
- Da jeg opdagede Amerika (travel, 1986)
- Skibet i flasken (1988)
- Landskab i to etager (1992)
- Hvide løgne (correspondence novel, written together with her daughter Sara Trier, 1995)
