= Fensmark =

- town
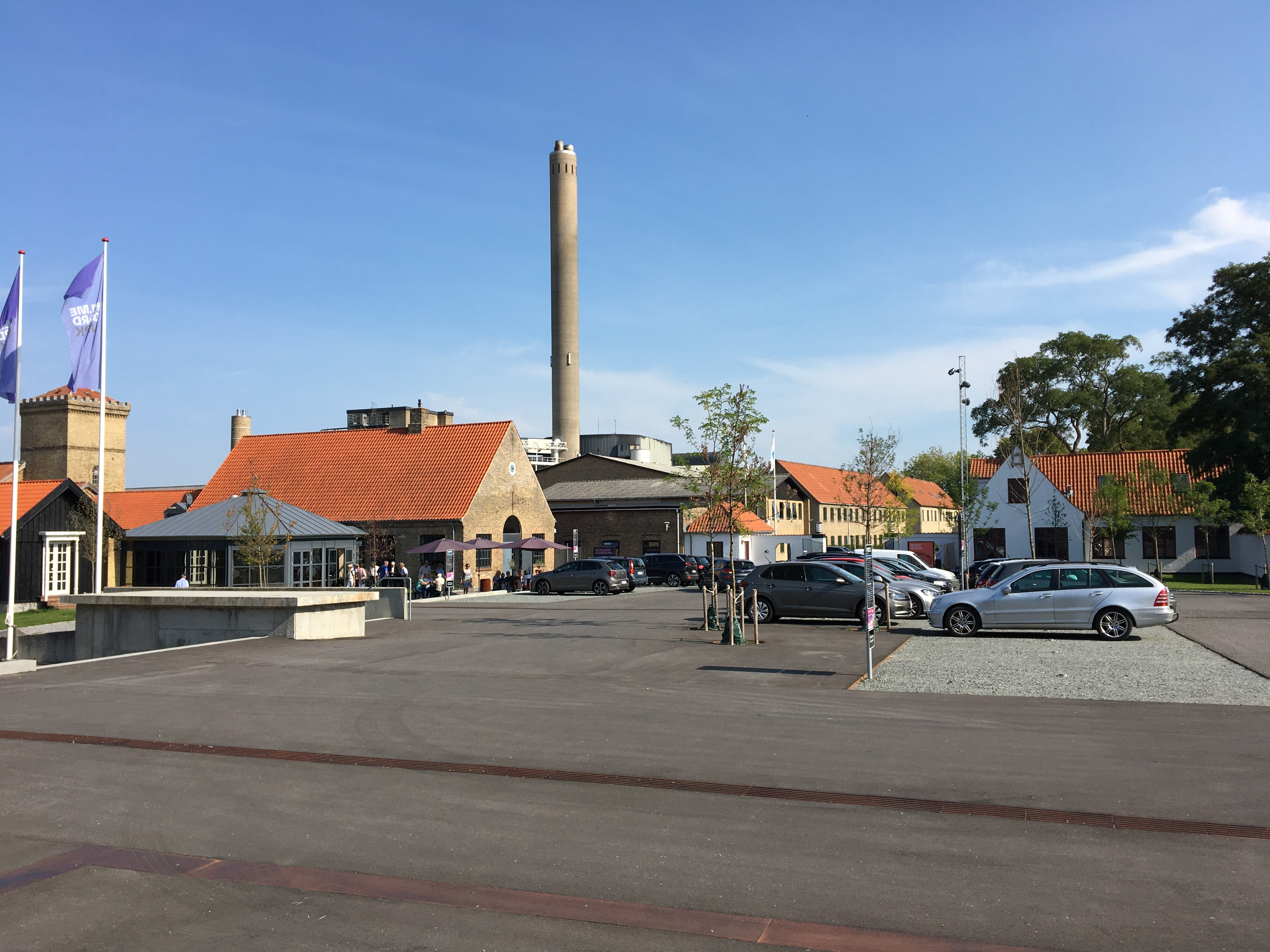
- Holmegaard Glass Works in Fensmark

- Location in Denmark Fensmark (Denmark Region Zealand)
- Coordinates: 55°16′40″N 11°48′18″E
- Country: Denmark
- Region: Region Zealand
- Municipality: Næstved Municipality

Area
  - Urban: 3.24 km^{2} (1.25 sq mi)

Population (2026)
  - Urban: 5,203
  - Urban density: 1,610/km^{2} (4,160/sq mi)
  - Gender: 2,517 males and 2,686 females
- Time zone: UTC+1 (CET)
  - Summer (DST): UTC+2 (CEST)
- Postal code: DK-4684 Holmegaard

Fensmark is the second largest town in Næstved Municipality on the south central part of the Danish island of Zealand. It is located about 6 km northeast of Næstved and has a population of 5,203 (1 January 2026)

Fensmark was the municipal seat of the former Holmegaard Municipality, until it was merged with four other municipalities to form the new Næstved Municipality on 1 January 2007.

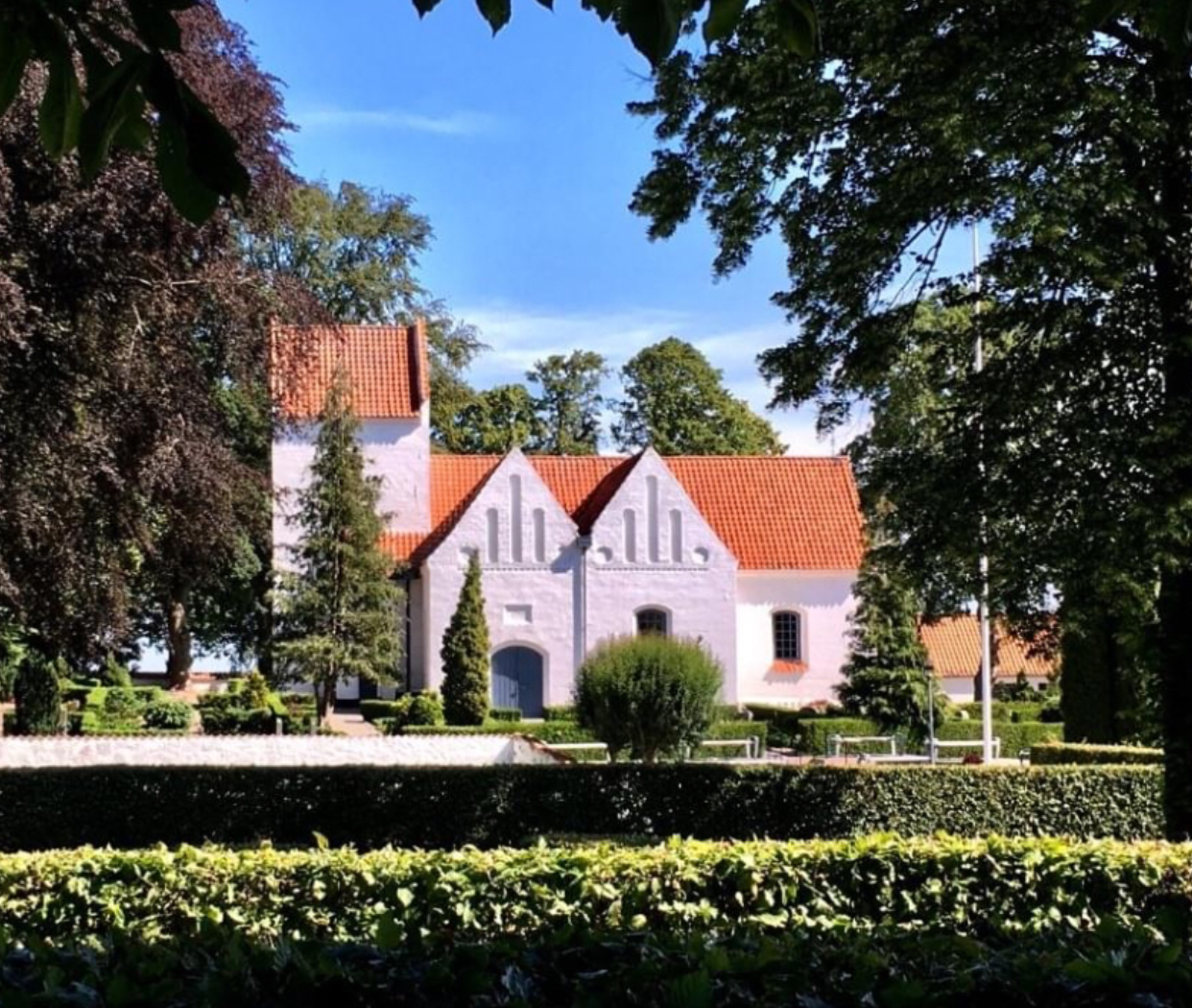
Fensmark Church

Fensmark Church is located in the old Fensmark village by Chr. Winthersvej and the path to the Glass Works. It was consecrated in the Middle Ages to Our Lady. The church was extended in 1825 and in 1921 after the establishment of Holmegaard Glass Works.

== Notable people ==
The Danish lyric poet Christian Winther (1796–1876) was born in Fensmark.
