= Christian Winther =

Danish poet (1796–1876)

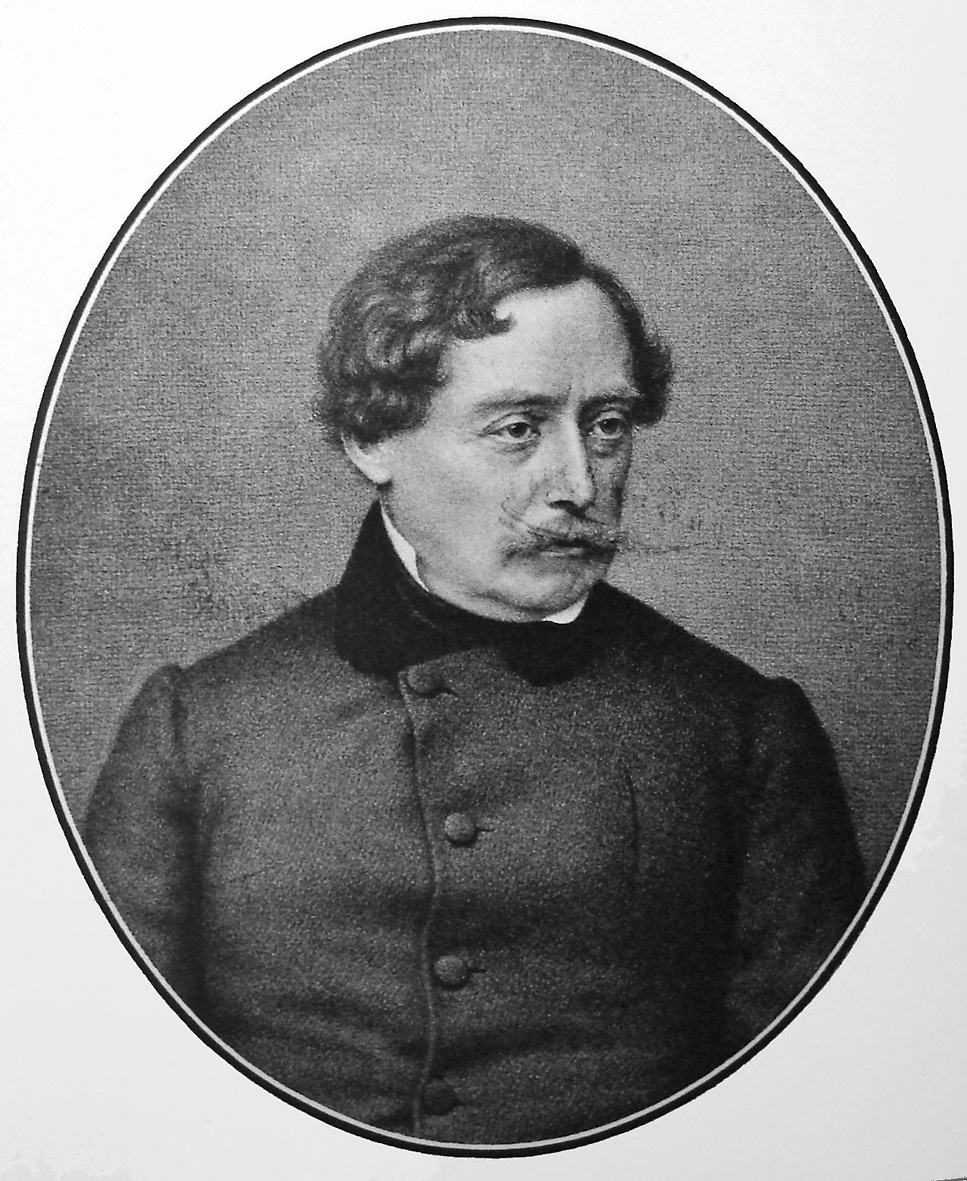
Christian Winther

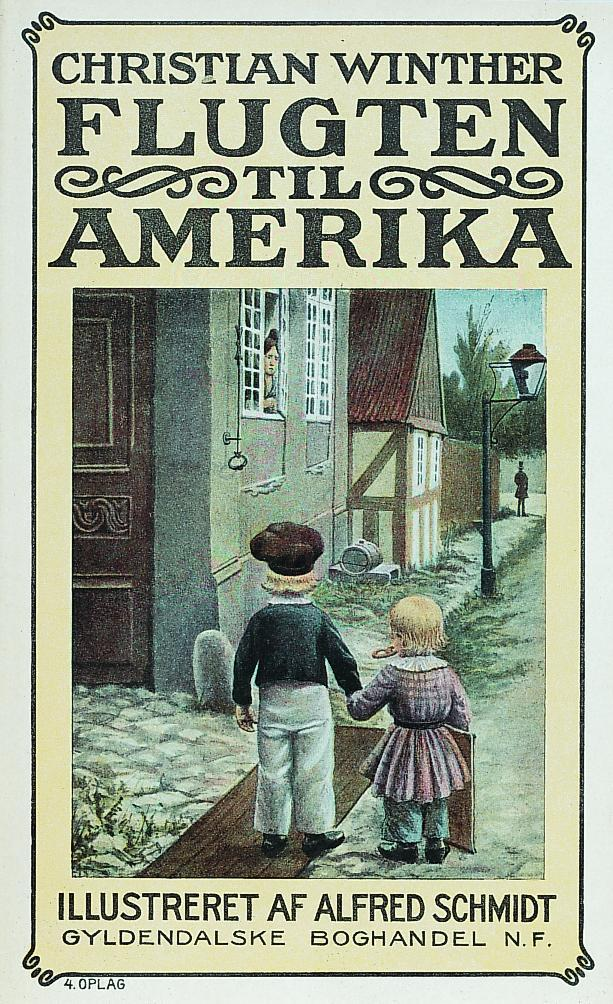
Flugten til Amerika, illustration by Alfred Schmidt, 1830

Rasmus Villads Christian Ferdinand Winther (29 July 1796 – 30 December 1876) was a Danish lyric poet.

He was born at Fensmark near Næstved, where his father was the vicar. He went to the University of Copenhagen in 1815, and studied theology, taking his degree in 1824. He began to publish verse in 1819, but no collected volume appeared until 1828. Meanwhile, from 1824 to 1830, Winther was supporting himself as a tutor. A large inheritance from his uncle, Rasmus Winther, allowed him in 1830 to travel to Italy for a year. In 1835 a second volume of lyric poems appeared, and in 1838 a third. In 1841 King Christian VIII of Denmark appointed Winther to travel to Mecklenburg to instruct Princess Mariane, on the occasion of her betrothal to the Crown Prince of Denmark, in the Danish language. When he was over fifty, Winther married.

Further collections of lyrics appeared in 1842, 1848, 1850, 1853, 1865 and 1872. In 1851 he, who had for most of his life been pestered by heavy debts, received a pension from the state as a poet, and for the next quarter of a century he resided mainly in Paris.

Besides the nine or ten volumes of lyrical verse mentioned above, Winther published Hjortens Flugt ("The Stag's Flight"), an epical romance in verse (1855). Taking place in 15th century South Zealand, written in Nibelungenlied stanzas and probably inspired by Byron's Mazeppa, it tells about young love, demonic forces and witchcraft with a running stag as the reappearing motive of the untamed forces of Nature. However, in the lyric intervals it also praises the idylls and freedom of Nature. In generations it became a traditional confirmation present for Danish youths in that respect competing with Paludan-Müller's Adam Homo.

Many of Winther's shorter poems have won popularity and have been transformed into songs, for instance Flyv fugl, flyv – ("Fly, Bird, fly"), and some of the verses from his collection Til Een, 1842, ("For One"), a tribute to his wife. A classic is also the small humorous epic poem for children: Flugten til Amerika 1830, (Engl. Transl. The Flight to America, 1976). Besides must be mentioned In the Year of Grace, a novel (1874); and other works in prose.

As a lover of woman and Nature, Winther is perhaps one of the Danish authors who is most closely connected to the concept of a romantic poet. Many later Danish lyrics have been inspired by his verses. His special ability of making Nature accompanying the action and his elegant and, compared with his time, rather sensual tributes to women was something new. Through The Stag's Flight, his main work, he won the name of "The Singer of Zealand".

He died in Paris, but his body was brought to Denmark, and was buried in the heart of the woods.
