= My Memories of Six Reigns =

1956 memoir by Princess Marie Louise of Schleswig-Holstein

- Author: Princess Marie Louise of Schleswig-Holstein
- Language: English
- Genre: Memoir
- Publisher: Evans Brothers Ltd
- Publication date: 1956
- Publication place: United Kingdom
- Media type: Print
- Pages: 328

My Memories of Six Reigns is a 1956 memoir by Princess Marie Louise of Schleswig-Holstein. Marie died a few weeks after the publication of the book. It was published by Evans Bros, Ltd. in 1956 with 328 pages and issued in paperback by Penguin Books in 1959. In an article in The Publishers' Circular and Booksellers' Record on the best-selling books of Christmas 1956 in Great Britain, the sales manager of Evans Bros, Ltd., Ralph G. Rolls, said that he was "confident that My Memories of Six Reigns would be a successful book but we were not prepared for the overwhelming demand". The book was read on the BBC Home Service during March 1957.

== Reception ==
It was reviewed by The Times, which described it as "naive, disorderly and delightful" and felt the book was notable for its descriptions of royal life during the latter years of the reign of Queen Victoria. The Times wrote of Victoria that Marie Louise "clearly remembers that formidable figure with as much affection as awe; and it is unforced love of humanity, royal and less than royal, that dominates even her joyous amusement at human foibles as the effervescent steam of anecdotes flows on through the story of her 80 years". The review felt her memoir "bears the unmistakable work of authentic memory" but critiqued her "shaky [...] book knowledge" which revealed itself in several historical errors. Kirkus Reviews described the memoir as "Decorous, and always generous [...] If there is an expected formality to her recital she is consistently appreciative. No gossip intrudes or demeans the character of the book which bears its heavy train of memories with dignity and discretion". The review concluded by stating that the memoir "lacks the spark that might widen its market". Francis Neilson in The American Journal of Economics and Sociology described the memoir as "one of the most fascinating volumes on royal personages that I have read". It was also positively reviewed in The Virginia Quarterly Review.
