= Jacob E. Bang =

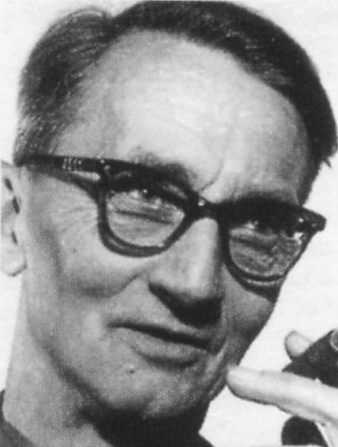
Bang in 1940

Jacob Eiler Bang (19 December 1899 in Frederiksberg – 16 March 1965 in Kongens Lyngby) was a Danish glass designer and architect. Bang originally studied architecture but soon changed to glass design. He joined Holmegaard Glass Factory in 1928 at a time when the company was in serious financial trouble. His functionalist glass designs received significant acclaim at international exhibitions.
