= Holmegaard Glass Factory =

Danish glassworks

Coordinates: 55.2844°N 11.8208°E

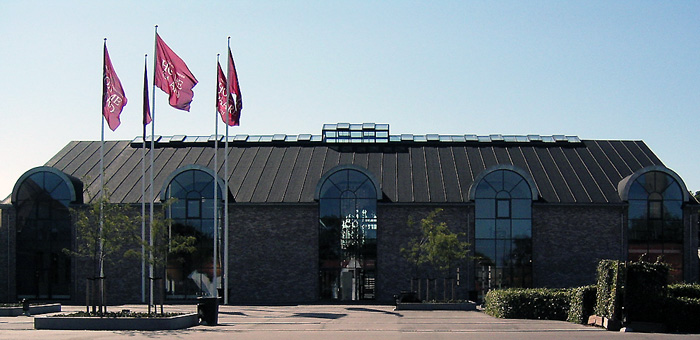
Holmegaard Glass Factory in 2006

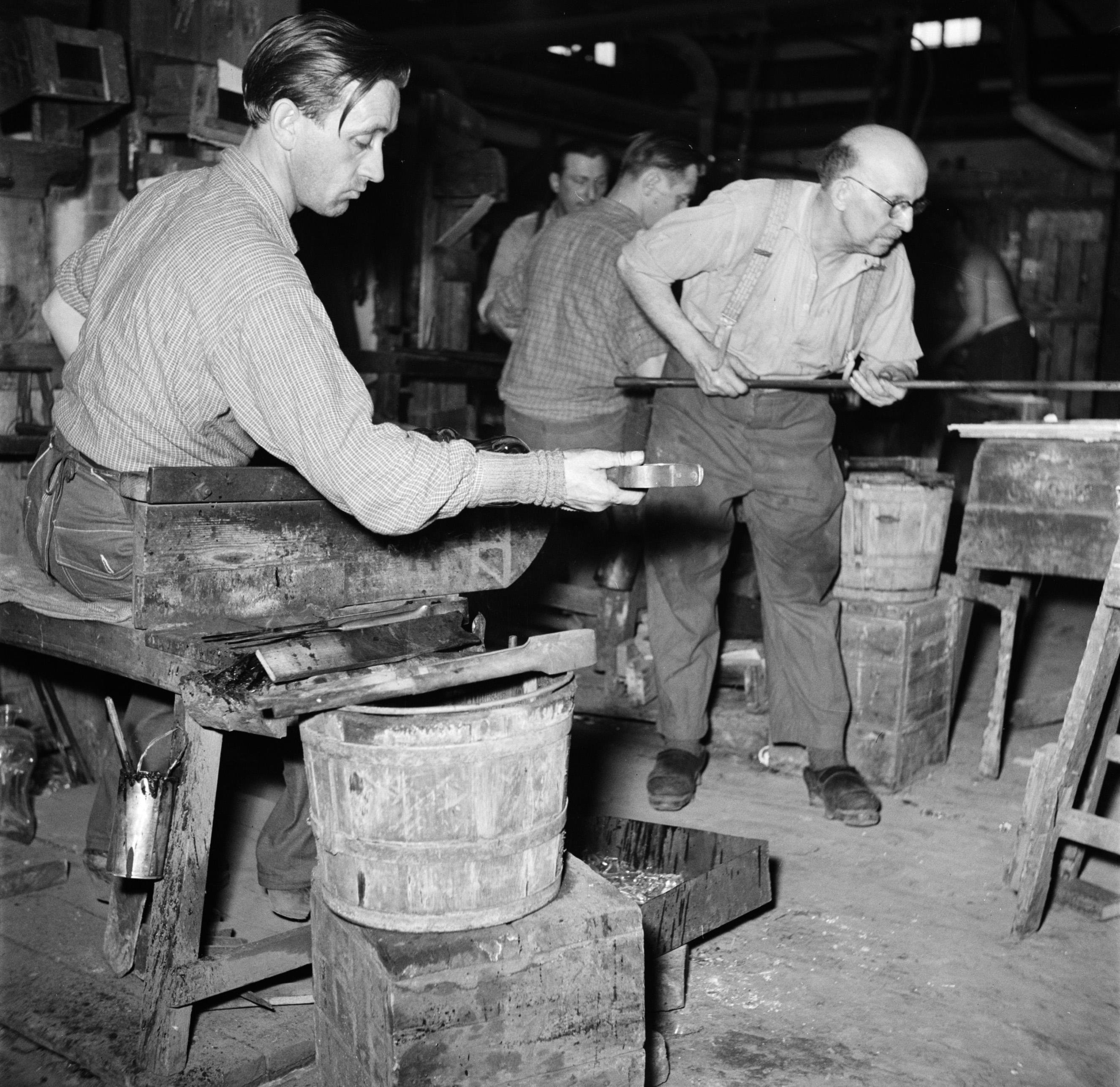
Workers at the Holmegaard Glass Factory in 1954

Holmegaard Glass Factory (Danish: Holmegaards Glasværk), founded in 1825, was a Danish company located just outside Næstved at Holmegaards Mose, Fensmark, and one of Denmark's oldest glassworks. In 1985, it merged with the Royal Porcelain Factory, however in 1995 the packaging part – now called Ardagh Glass Holmegaard – was sold to Ardagh Group, while the art part – as the experience center Holmegaard Entertainment – went bankrupt in 2008. In 2008, the Holmegaard brand was purchased by Rosendahl A/S. In 2010, the glassworks were acquired by Sparekassen Faaborg at an auction. In 2020, the place was reopened as a museum named Holmegaard Værk, as part of Museum Sydøstdanmark. The company is known for its high-quality products of Danish design.

== History ==
Holmegaard Glass Factory is located in the town of Fensmark, in the former municipality of Holmegaard. The company was founded in 1823 after Count Christian Conrad Sophus Danneskiold-Samsøe petitioned the Danish king for permission to build a glass factory at Holmegaards Mose (lit. 'Holmegaards Bog'). He died before permission was granted. But after his death when permission was finally received his widow, Countess Henriette Danneskiold-Samsøe pursued the project, and the factory began producing green bottles in 1825, moving on to table-glass within its first decade.

In 1847, Kastrup Glasværk was established by the son of the founders of Holmegaard, Christian Conrad Sophus Danneskiold-Samsøe (1800-1886). It was sold in 1873.

Much of its early work was derivative and inconsequential, but between the 1930s and the 1980s, its fortunes were transformed by the designs of Jacob E. Bang (1899–1965) and Per Lütken (1916–1998). Holmegaard began having artistic directors in the 1920s (unlike other Danish glassworks which did so in the 1950s), with Orla Juul Nielsen being the first in 1924 – the result of a short-term collaboration with the Royal Porcelain Factory. Jacob E. Bang was appointed artistic director in 1928, followed by Per Lütken in 1942.

=== The Lütken era (1942–1998) ===
Danish glassmaker Per Lütken worked as artistic director at Holmegaard from 1942 until his death in 1998, creating some of the factory's finest pieces and all-time classics, such as the "Ideelle" (ideal) series, the "Skibsglas" (ship glass) and the "Provence" bowls. The work of Per Lütken is still highly regarded, especially throughout Scandinavia, and in Denmark and Sweden in particular. The arrival of Lütken at Holmegaard marked a new beginning in the factory's history, which once again bloomed after several years of suffering. His aesthetic creations, in timeless designs, appealed to the fashion of 1960s Denmark, and his creations became a commercial success throughout the decade and the 1970s.

In 1965, Holmegaard merged with Kastrup Glasværk, Fyens Glasværk, and Hellerup Glasværk as Kastrup-Holmegaards Glasværk A/S. As a result of the 1973 oil crisis, Hellerup Glasværk and Kastrup Glasværk were closed, in 1975 and in 1979, respectively. The name became Holmegaards Glasværker A/S. In 1985, Holmegaard merged with the Royal Porcelain Factory. With the closure of Fyens Glasværk in 1990, Holmegaard was Denmark's only remaining glassworks.

The modern glassworks – designed by architect Svenn Eske Kristensen – were built in 1972.

=== The split ===
In 1995, the packaging part was sold to Ardagh and became a company called Ardagh Glass Holmegaard. The art part was then sold in 2004 to the development company Ibco, which wanted to turn the place into an experience centre Holmegaard Entertainment.

=== Later ===
In the summer of 2008 the Holmegaard brand was purchased by Rosendahl A/S. Holmegaard Entertainment went bankrupt in September 2008. The old glassworks building in Holmegaard was put up for auction in March 2010, and was taken over by Sparekassen Faaborg.

=== Now ===
In 2020, the place was reopened as a museum named Holmegaard Værk, as part of Museum Sydøstdanmark. It exhibits over 42,000 Holmegaard products in its collection, and some of the most famous can be seen up close. In addition, various glass artists demonstrate how to work with glass.

== Notable glassmakers at Holmegaard ==
- Jacob E. Bang
- Per Lütken
