= Per Lütken =

Danish glassmaker

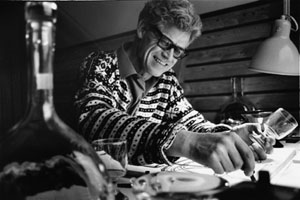
Lütken in 1965

Per Lütken (10 November 1916 – 10 February 1998) was a Danish glassmaker, most famous for his works at Holmegaard Glass Factory (Danish: Holmegaard Glasværk). He was born in Copenhagen. He studied at the School of Danish Crafts (Skolen for dansk kunsthåndværk) from 1932 to 1938. Lütken has made a mark on the history of Danish glassmaking, designing more than 3,000 pieces of glass for Holmegaard, a company for whom he worked as artistic director from 1942 until his death in 1998.

Amongst the best known series created by him are "Ideelle", "Skibsglas", "No. 5", "Selandia" and "Charlotte Amalie", all of which are still selling at high prices throughout the world. They are all regarded as design icons, and are found in many Danish homes to this day.
