= Kastrup Glasværk =

Danish glassworks

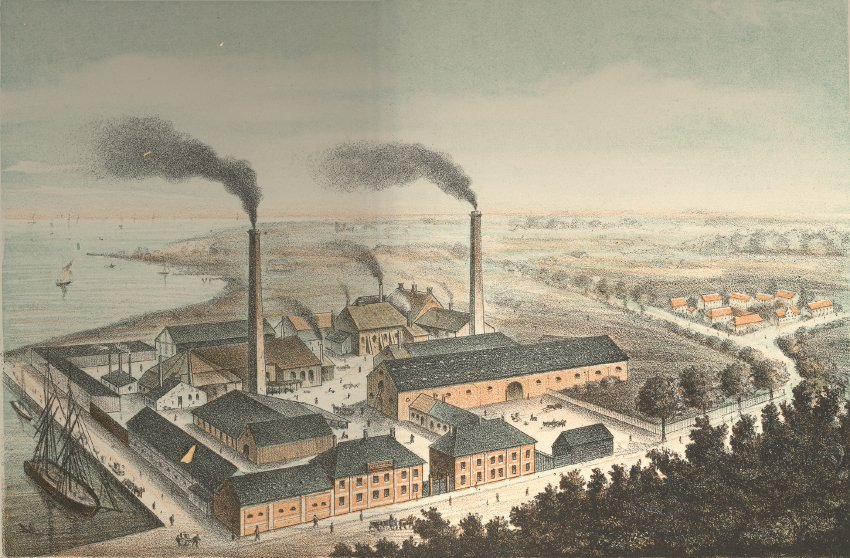
Kastrup Glassworks, c. 1888

Kastrup Glasværk was a Danish glassworks located in Copenhagen, Denmark. Kastrup Glasværk was also the parent company of Hellerup Glasværk, De forenede Glasværker in Odense and Aarhus Glasværk in Aarhus.

== History ==
Kastrup Glasværk was founded on 12 October 1847 by Christian Conrad Sophus Danneskiold-Samsøe (1800-1886). He had inherited Holmegaard glassworks at Næstved from his mother Henriette Danneskiold-Samsøe in 1843. The company was converted into an aktieselskab in 1873. In 1881, the company acquired Tuborg Fabrikers Glasværk, whose name was subsequently changed to Hellerup Glasværk. In 1883, the company also took over Godthaab Glasværk in Helsingør. In 1907, Kastrup Glasværk acquired A/S De forenede Glasværker in Odense and Frederiksberg Glasværk. A/S De forenede Glasværker comprised Fyns Glasværk in Odense (founded on 11 June 1874) and Aarhus Glasværk in Aarhus (founded 1898). In 1918, Aalborg Glasværk in Aalborg (founded in 1853) was acquired.

In 1965, Kastrup Glasværk merged with Holmegaard under the name Kastrup og Holmegaards Glasværker A/S. The principal shareholders were Carlsberg Group, De forenede Bryggerier and Elisabeth Lassen who had inherited Holmegaard from her father (Count Aage Danneskiold-Samsøe) in 1945. The merged company had about 1,935 employees and a total production of about 102,000 tonnes. Production ceased in 1979.

== Headquarters ==
Kastrup Glasværk was from 1892 headquartered at Nørre Voldgade 12 in central Copenhagen. The Historicist building was designed by the architect Philip Smidth. The company name is still seen on the facade. The building is now home to Teknisk Landsforbund.

== Products ==
Kastrup Glasværk was initially a manufacturer of bottles. The production was automated in 1912. The company later also began to manufacture other products such as drinking glasses, tableware, flasks, bell jars and light fixtures.
