= Lambrook =

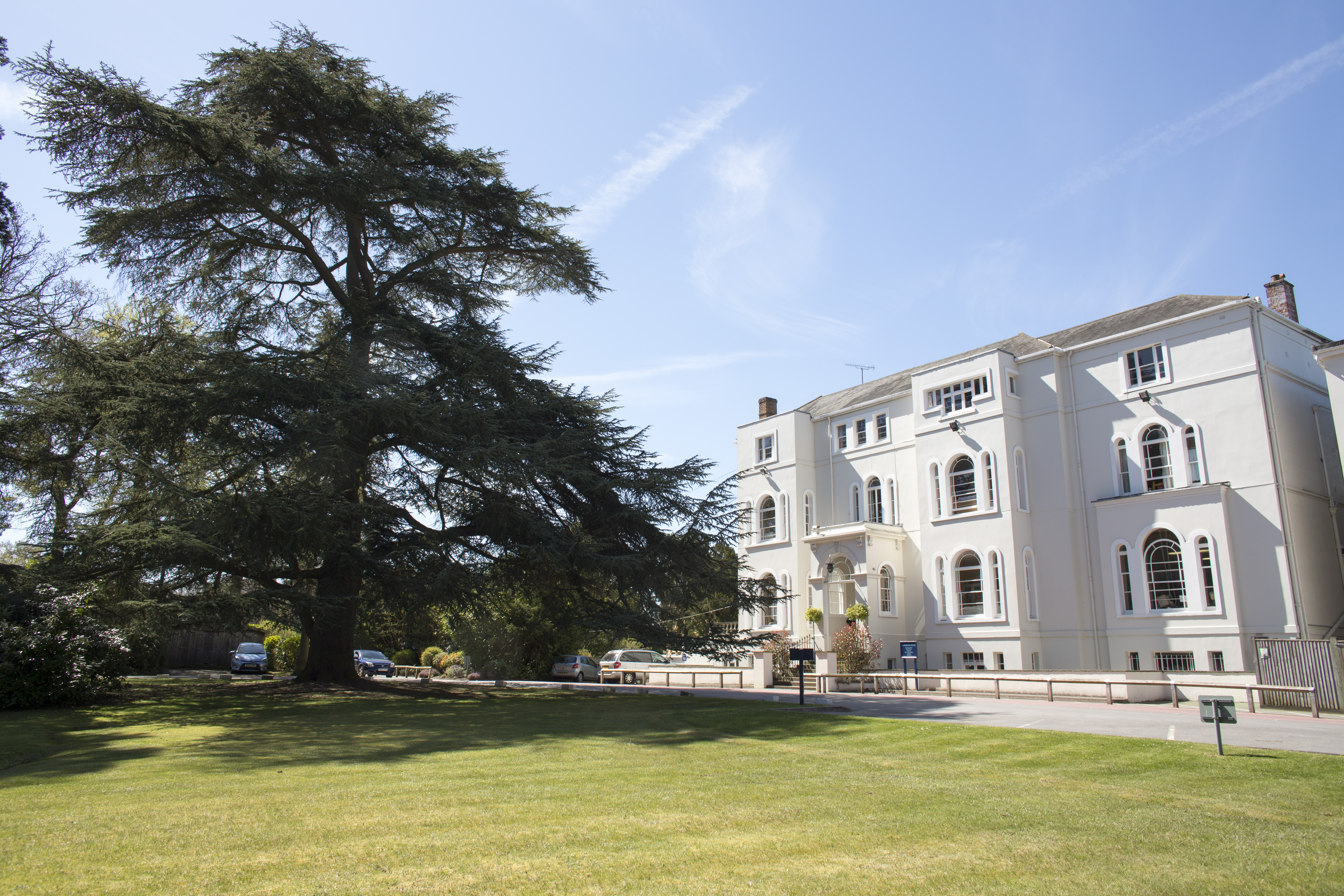

Location
- Winkfield Row; Winkfield, Berkshire, RG42 6LU; England; 51.4346°N 0.7145°W

Information
- Former names: Lambrook-Haileybury
- Type: Private school; Day and boarding school
- Motto: Feathers To Fly
- Religious affiliation: Christian
- Established: 1860
- Founder: Robert Burnside
- Specialist: School
- Chairman of Governors: Patrick Burrowes
- Headmaster: Jonathan Perry
- Staff: 190
- Gender: Boys and girls
- Age: 3 to 13
- Enrolment: 615
- Houses: Alexander, Athlone, Dewar, Goodhart
- Colours: Navy and Duck Egg
- Website: www.lambrookschool.co.uk

Lambrook is an independent preparatory school for 615 boys and girls, aged 3–13, set in 52 acres (21 ha) of Berkshire countryside.

== History ==
The school was founded in 1860 by Robert Burnside, in a large country house built in 1853 by William Budd. Burnside initially employed only one master, and by 1879 there were twenty one boys, including two grandsons of Queen Victoria, Prince Christian Victor and Prince Albert of Schleswig-Holstein. Run as a traditional boys' boarding school, Lambrook accepted only male pupils between the ages of 7 and 13 until 1993.

In 1883, Edward Mansfield took over as headmaster, with 46 boys, and made substantial additions to the property, almost doubling its size. Mansfield's expansion saw Lambrook gain a reputation as an efficiently run and forward-looking school, although this came at significant financial cost, which placed the school's finances under considerable pressure. It was around this time that what was later termed as 'a row', of undetermined origin and nature, took place, which saw almost all of the pupils leave.

Upon the accession of Francis Browne in 1904, there were only 35 pupils and seven teaching staff, but by 1935 the school had expanded again to 59 boys. The current chapel was built under Francis Browne's tenure, in 1905. By 1945 there were 90 boys and a nearby residence, Westfield, was purchased to accommodate 30 pupils. When Archie Forbes took over in 1952 the school finances were at crisis point, and only improved by the time Philip Brownless, Archie Forbes' son-in-law, was appointed in 1956. However, substantial death duty liabilities hit Lambrook when Archie Forbes died in the same year, and the financial ruin that the school then faced was only averted in 1967, when Lambrook became a Charitable Trust.

By 1971, there were 120 boys, increasing to 140 by 1997. Major expansions of the premises took place between 1978 and 1984 during the tenure of headmaster Tom Clough, including a new teaching block, a squash court and an all-weather pitch. During this period, the school gained an outstanding reputation for a high calibre of teaching and the academic and sporting achievements of its pupils. Lambrook declined under the tenure of Michael Bickersteth (1989–92), with numbers dropping considerably, a trend not significantly changed by his successor Robin Badham Thornhill, who resigned in 1997 to take up the Headship of Summerfields, Oxford.

In 1993, a pre-prep department was opened with five children, increasing to 69 by 1997. In that year the Governors approved a merger with Haileybury Junior School in Windsor which was beset by the limitations of its site, and John Hare, headmaster of Haileybury was appointed to the new combined school, called Lambrook-Haileybury, with 200 children, now of both sexes, both boarders and day pupils. Robert Deighton's tenure as Head saw the school flourish with numbers growing to over 450. A nursery was opened during the tenure of the head of Pre-Prep Mrs Coombe. In July 2009, the school ceased links with Haileybury, and returned to the original name of Lambrook. Current headmaster, Jonathan Perry, has been in place since 2010, having formerly been head of Kingsmead School in Hoylake, which has since closed.

All of the children of William, Prince of Wales have been pupils of Lambrook School.

== Notable former pupils ==
- Prince Christian Victor of Schleswig-Holstein, grandson of Queen Victoria and British Army officer who died during the Boer War
- Prince Albert of Schleswig-Holstein, grandson of Queen Victoria and Prussian army officer
- W.O. Bentley, English engineer and founder of Bentley Motors Limited
- Lord Alfred Douglas, author, poet and lover of Oscar Wilde
- Gilbert Heathcote-Drummond-Willoughby, 2nd Earl of Ancaster, Conservative Member of Parliament and peer
- Raymond Asquith, eldest son of wartime Prime Minister H. H. Asquith and member of The Coterie, killed during the Battle of the Somme
- Arthur Asquith, British officer during World War I; third son of Prime Minister H. H. Asquith
- Herbert Asquith, poet, novelist, lawyer. Second son of H. H. Asquith
- Raymond Raikes, British theatre producer, director and broadcaster
- John Aubrey-Fletcher, Lieutenant-Colonel Sir John Henry Lancelot Aubrey-Fletcher, 7th Baronet (22 August 1912 – 19 June 1992), British baronet who played first-class cricket for Oxford and was a British Army soldier.
- W.C. Sellar, author, 1066 and All That
- Eric Dorman-Smith, County Cavan native British Army officer during World War II; subsequent supporter of Irish republicanism
- Oswald Phipps, 4th Marquess of Normanby KG, British peer and Knight of the Garter
- Sir Roy Redgrave, former Major General Commanding the Household Division of the British Army
- James Meade, Nobel Prize–winning economist
- Sandy Millar, retired Anglican bishop, vicar of Holy Trinity Brompton and founder of the Alpha course
- Alistair Irwin, Adjutant General to the British Army 2003 to 2005
- Max Evans, Scottish rugby player
- Thom Evans, Scottish rugby player
- Alex Pettyfer, actor
- Prince George of Wales, who is second in line to the British throne.
