= Countess Louise Danneskiold-Samsøe =

Louise Sophie
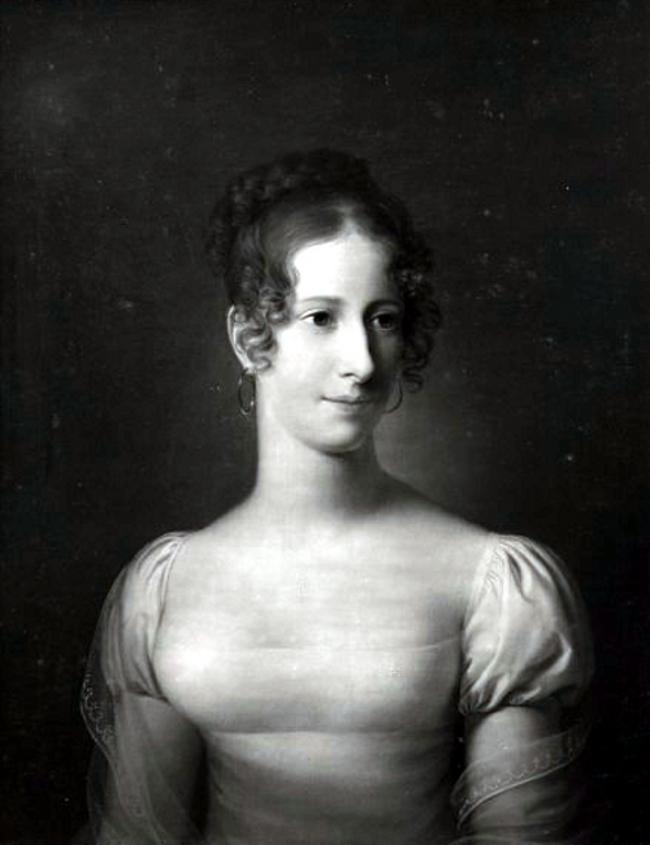

Duchess consort of Schleswig-Holstein-Sonderburg-Augustenburg
- Tenure: 18 September 1820 – 11 March 1867
- Born: 22 September 1796; Gisselfeld, Denmark
- Died: 11 March 1867 (aged 70); Primkenau, Prussia
- Spouse: Christian August II, Duke of Schleswig-Holstein-Sonderburg-Augustenburg (m. 1820)
- Issue: Alexander, Hereditary Prince; Princess Louise Auguste; Princess Caroline Amelie; Princess Wilhelmine; Frederick VIII; Prince Christian; Princess Henriette
- House: Danneskiold-Samsøe
- Father: Christian Conrad, Count af Danneskiold-Samsøe
- Mother: Johanne Henriette Valentine Kaas

Countess Louise Sophie of Danneskiold-Samsøe (22 September 1796 – 11 March 1867) was a member of a Danish noble family descended illegitimately from Christian V of Denmark, and the wife of Christian August II, Duke of Schleswig-Holstein-Sonderburg-Augustenburg. She was the grandmother of German Empress Auguste Victoria, wife of the last German Emperor Wilhelm II.

== Early life ==
Countess Louise Sophie of Danneskiold-Samsøe was born on 22 September 1796 in Gisselfeld, Denmark to Christian Conrad, Count af Danneskiold-Samsøe and his wife Johanne Henriette Valentine Kaas, daughter of the Danish Admiral Frederik Christian Kaas and a descendant of the war hero Jørgen Kaas. The House of Danneskiold-Samsøe is a non-dynastic branch of the House of Oldenburg, descended from Christian Gyldenløve, Count of Samsø, an illegitimate son of Christian V of Denmark by his mistress Sophie Amalie Moth.

== Marriage and issue ==
On 18 September 1820 she married her second cousin Christian August II, Duke of Schleswig-Holstein-Sonderburg-Augustenburg at the Church of Braaby, Gisselfeld. They had seven children:

- Prince Alexander Frederick William Christian Charles Augustus (20 July 1821 – 3 May 1823), died young
- Princess Louise Auguste (28 August 1823 – 30 May 1872)
- Princess Caroline Amelie (15 January 1826 – 3 May 1901)
- Princess Wilhelmine (24 March 1828 – 4 July 1829)
- Prince Frederick Christian August (6 July 1829 – 14 January 1880), later Duke of Schleswig-Holstein-Sonderburg-Augustenburg. He married Princess Adelheid of Hohenlohe-Langenburg and became father of one surviving son and four daughters including Augusta Viktoria, German Empress.
- Frederick Christian Charles Augustus (22 January 1831 – 28 October 1917), he married Princess Helena of the United Kingdom, and settled in England. They were the parents of Albert, Duke of Schleswig-Holstein.
- Princess Caroline Christiane Auguste Emilie Henriette Elisabeth (2 August 1833 – 18 October 1917), married in 1872 Johann Friedrich von Esmarch (9 January 1823 – 23 February 1908)

== Later life and death ==
Louise Sophie died on 11 March 1867 in Primkenau in the Kingdom of Prussia, aged 70 and was buried in the Lutheran church of Primkenau.

== Descendants ==
Her descendants include: Auguste Viktoria, German Empress, Queen Frederica of the Hellenes, Constantine II of Greece, Queen Sofía of Spain, Felipe VI of Spain and Carl XVI Gustaf of Sweden.

== Ancestry ==
Ancestors of Countess Louise Danneskiold-Samsøe

8. Count Christian Danneskiold-Samsøe
4. Count Frederik Christian Danneskiold-Samsøe
9. Countess Conradine Christiane Friis
2. Count Christian Danneskiold-Samsøe
10. Christian Adam von Kleist
5. Friederike Louise von Kleist
11. Sophie Rosenkrantz
1. Countess Louise Danneskiold-Samsøe
12. Ulrich Kaas
6. Frederik Christian Kaas
13. Mette Matthisen
3. Henriette Kaas
14. Otto Ditlev Kaas
7. Edele Sophie Kaas
15. Sophie Dorothea von Eickstedt
