= Rosendahl Design Group =

- Type: Ceramics
- Founded: 1984; 42 years ago
- Founder: Erik Rosendahl
- Headquarters: Hørsholm, Denmark
- Area served: World Wide
- Key people: Henrik Rosendahl (CEO)
- Products: Design products
- Website: Official Website

Rosendahl Design Group is a family-owned housewares and kitchen utensil company based in Hørsholm, Denmark.

== History ==
The company was founded by Erik Rosendahl in 1984 and originally represented Iittala on the Danish market. The company bought its first design brand in 1990 and the first design collection under the Rosendahl brand was launched in 1992. It established an export division in 1997. A new collaboration with Danish designer Lin Utzon commenced in 1999. Henrik Rosendahl took over the post as CEO after his father in 2005. The company purchased the Holmegaard brand in 2008. The company changed its name from Rosendahl A/S to Rosendahl Design Group to reflect the strategy with buying up existing design brands in 2010.

== Headquarters ==
The company inaugurated its current headquarters in Hørsholm in 2003. The building was designed by Kim Utzon.

== Brands ==
=== Rosendahl ===
The Rosendahl brand was first launched in 1992. Products include the Grand Cru series of kitchenware.

=== Holmegaard ===
The Holmegaard brand was acquired in 2008. Holmegaard Glassworks was founded in Næstved in 1825. Products sold under the Holmegaard brand include classic Holmegaard designs as well as new designs. The production takes place in Poland, Slovakia and Turkey.

=== Kay Bojesen ===
Rosendahl Design Group bought the rights to the manufacture, market and sell Kay Bojesen's wooden animal figures in 1990.

=== Arne Jacobsen ===
In 2008 Rosendahl Design Group acquired the right to revive the production of three wall clocks designed by Arne Jacobsen. The three models—Bankers, City Hall and Roman—were launched in 2009.

=== Lyngby Porcelæn ===
Rosendahl Design Group acquired the Lyngby Porcelæn design brand in 2007. The brand is known for its Lyngby Porcelæn vases as well as textile design.

=== Kähler ===
Rosendahl Design Group bought Kähler Keramik in 2018.

=== JUNA ===
Rosendahl Design Group bought JUNA in 2016.

=== Bjørn Wiinblad ===
Rosendahl Design Group bought Bjørn Wiinblad in 2012.

- Rosendahl Timepieces
