= Christian Danneskiold-Samsøe (Danish nobleman, born 1774) =

Danish councillor, landowner and magistrate (1774-1823)

Christian Conrad Sophus Danneskiold-Samsøe
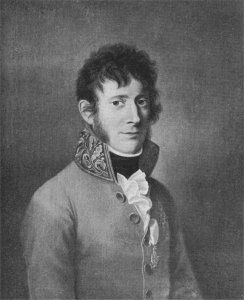
- Portrait by Christian Gottlieb Kratzenstein Stub, 1813
- Born: 11 June 1774
- Died: 6 June 1823 (aged 48)
- Spouse: Henriette Danneskiold-Samsøe
- Issue: Louise Sophie, Duchess of Schleswig-Holstein-Sonderburg-Augustenburg
- Father: Frederik Christian Danneskiold-Samsøe
- Mother: Friederike Louisa von Kleist

Christian Conrad Sophus, Lensgreve Danneskiold-Samsøe (11 June 1774 – 6 June 1823) was a Danish councillor, board member, landowner and magistrate.

== Early life and education ==
He was the son of Frederik Christian Danneskiold-Samsøe (1722–1778) and his second wife Friederike Louisa von Kleist (1747–1814). When he was just over 3.5 years old, he lost his father. In 1785, the poet and priest Christian Andersen Lund became his supervisor.

== Career and property ==
In 1792, when he was still a minor, he joined the Council of Samsøe County and the board of Gisselfeld Abbey. We can infer his plans from the fact that in 1792-1793, he made a long journey abroad and drew up a new set of corvée rules for Gisselfeld Abbey, in which the position of the peasants was much improved. He embraced new legislation for rural affairs and went further than the law required. He encouraged forestry and horticulture on his domains. He gradually acquired more estates, in Holmegaard, Ravnstrup, Næsbyholm, Bavelse, Nordfeld and Aalebæksgaard and Rosendal. To facilitate transportation of timber from his forest at Næsbyholm, he canalized the Suså River from Bavelse to Næstved. This "Danneskiold Canal" was opened on 11 September 1812.

In 1808 he became prefect of Præstø County; he retained this position until his death. He initiated various public works, such as a port at Karrebaeksminde, a hospital in Naestved, etc. In 1799 Christian led the drafting of a new charter for Gisselfeld Abbey. in which access to monastery was eased by reducing the monetary deposit required, while the number of nuns was increased. He also enlarged the convent business by allowing girls from all social classes into the abbey school system for an annual fee. Until 1821, the monastery had only accepted ladies from noble families as nuns. In that year, Christian added a department for the daughters of commoners.

== Awards ==
In 1808 Christian received the Order of the Dannebrog and the 13th place in the Danish Order of Precedence, for himself and his descendants. In 1815, he became a Privy Councillor.

== Personal life and legacy ==
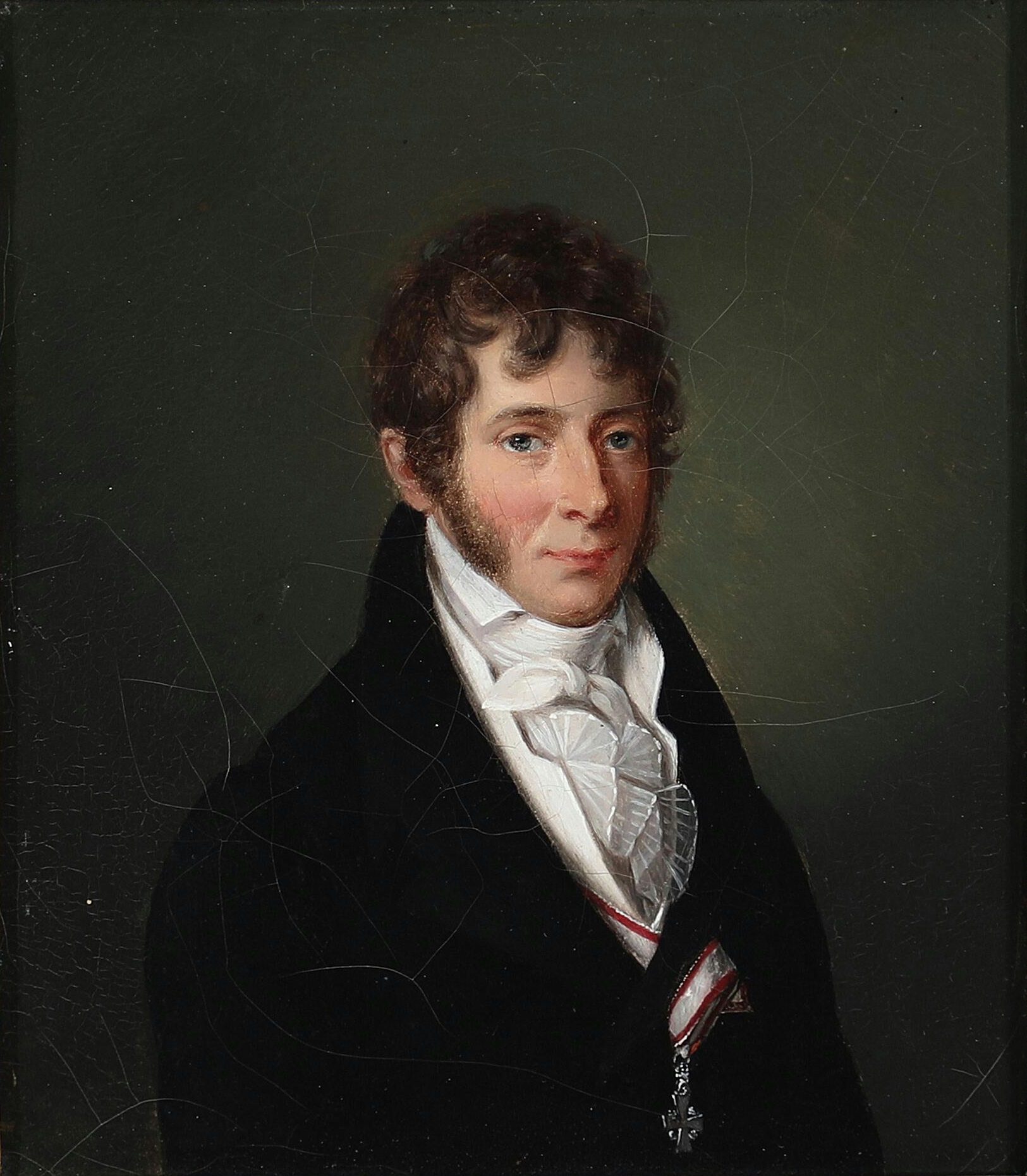
Posthumous portrait of Christian by Louis Aumont

On 30 November 1795, he married Johanne Henriette Valentine Kaas (12 August 1776 – 28 July 1843), daughter of Admiral Frederik Christian Kaas and his wife Edele Sophie Kaas. After Christian's death, on 6 June 1823, his widow administered their property skillfully. She managed to complete the Holmegaard Glass Factory that he had initiated and later she also created two brick factories at Holmegaard. They had the following children:

- Countess Louise Sophie Danneskiold-Samsøe (1796–1867) m. Christian August II, Duke of Schleswig-Holstein-Sonderburg-Augustenburg
- Frederik Christian, Count of Danneskiold-Samsøe (1798–1869)
- Christian Conrad Sophus, Count of Danneskiold-Samsøe (1800–1886)
- Count Sophus of Danneskiold-Samsøe (1804-1894)
- Countess Henriette of Danneskiold-Samsøe (1806–1858) m. Prince Frederick of Schleswig-Holstein-Sonderburg-Augustenburg
- Countess Christiane of Danneskiold-Samsøe (1809–1873) m. Count Gustav Holck-Winterfeldt

Civic offices
Preceded by Johan Rudolph Bielke	County governor of Præstø County; 1808–1826	Succeeded by Ludvig Moltke
