= Henriette Danneskiold-Samsøe =

Danish businesswoman (1776-1843)

Bust of Henriette Danneskiold-Samsøe by Bertel Thorvaldsen (1839)

Johanne Henriette Valentine Danneskiold-Samsøe née Kaas (12 August 1776 – 28 July 1843) was a Danish countess who, when widowed, fulfilled her former husband's plans by founding the Holmegaard Glass Factory near Næstved in 1825. In so doing, she became one of Denmark's most notable early businesswomen. Danneskiold-Samsøe is also remembered for the correspondence she maintained with her former tutor Peder Deichmann.

== Biography ==
Born on 12 August 1776 in Copenhagen, Johanne Henriette Valentine Kaas was one of the nine children of Admiral Frederik Christian Kaas and his wife Edele Sofie née Kaas. She was educated at home together with her sisters by the tutor Peder Deichmann with whom she corresponded actively until his death in 1816.

On 30 November 1795, Henriette Kaas married Count Christian Conrad Danneskiold-Samsøe from the noble Danneskiold-Samsøe family. They developed a truly romantic relationship which deepened over the years. Living on the large Gisselfeld Estate, they entertained the leading writers of the day, including N.F.S. Grundtvig and Hans Christian Andersen. In the 1820s, after acquiring the Holmegaard estate, he planned to create a glass factory there as he realized the local peat could be used as fuel. He requested permission from the king to go ahead with his plans in 1823 but died before receiving an answer.

Countess Danneskiold-Samsøe persisted, receiving permission from the king to build the factory. Despite having to care for her six children alone, she was able to open the Holmegaard Glasværk in 1825, originally producing green glass bottles but soon moving into fine crystal glass.

Henriette Danneskiold-Samsøe died in Copenhagen on 28 July 1843.
