= 1559 =

1559 in various calendars
- Gregorian calendar: 1559; MDLIX
- Ab urbe condita: 2312
- Armenian calendar: 1008; ԹՎ ՌԸ
- Assyrian calendar: 6309
- Balinese saka calendar: 1480–1481
- Bengali calendar: 965–966
- Berber calendar: 2509
- English Regnal year: 1 Eliz. 1 – 2 Eliz. 1
- Buddhist calendar: 2103
- Burmese calendar: 921
- Byzantine calendar: 7067–7068
- Chinese calendar: 戊午年 (Earth Horse); 4256 or 4049 — to — 己未年 (Earth Goat); 4257 or 4050
- Coptic calendar: 1275–1276
- Discordian calendar: 2725
- Ethiopian calendar: 1551–1552
- Hebrew calendar: 5319–5320
- Hindu calendars
- Vikram Samvat: 1615–1616
- Shaka Samvat: 1480–1481
- Kali Yuga: 4659–4660
- Holocene calendar: 11559
- Igbo calendar: 559–560
- Iranian calendar: 937–938
- Islamic calendar: 966–967
- Japanese calendar: Eiroku 2 (永禄２年)
- Javanese calendar: 1478–1479
- Julian calendar: 1559; MDLIX
- Korean calendar: 3892
- Minguo calendar: 353 before ROC 民前353年
- Nanakshahi calendar: 91
- Thai solar calendar: 2101–2102
- Tibetan calendar: ས་ཕོ་རྟ་ལོ་ (male Earth-Horse); 1685 or 1304 or 532 — to — ས་མོ་ལུག་ལོ་ (female Earth-Sheep); 1686 or 1305 or 533

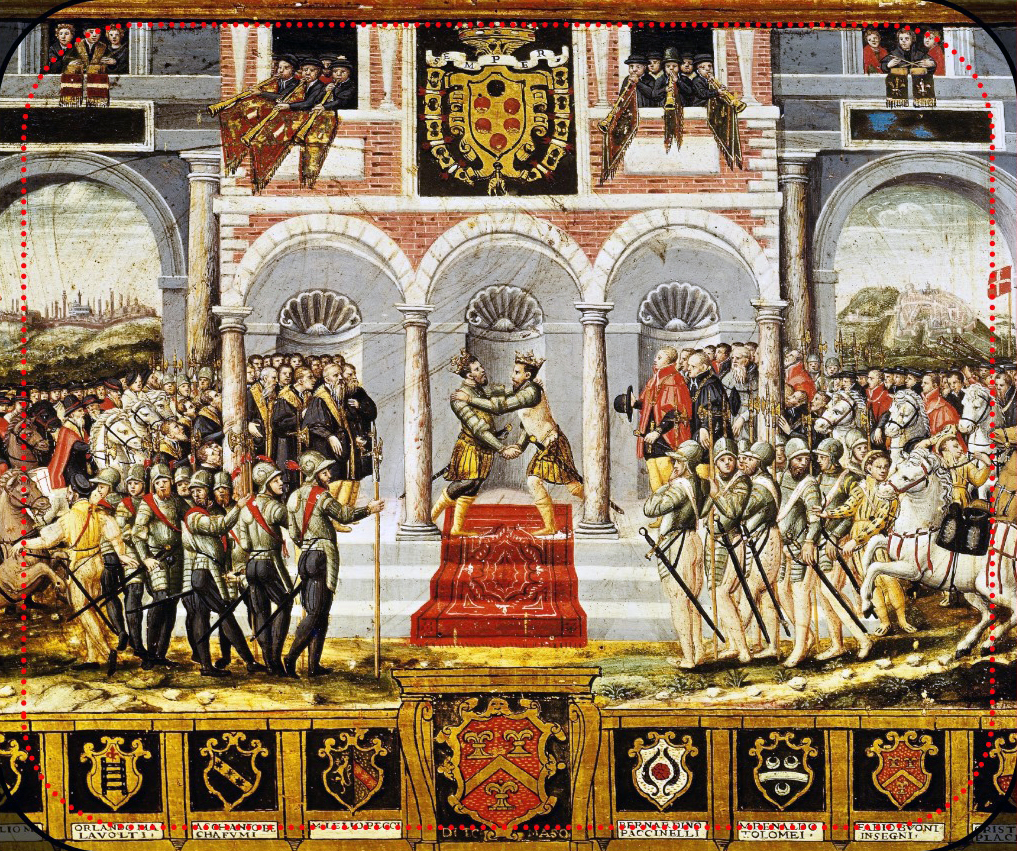
April 3– The Peace of Cateau Cambrésis is concluded

Year 1559 (MDLIX) was a common year starting on Sunday of the Julian calendar.

== Events ==
=== January–March ===
- January 15 – Elizabeth I of England is crowned, in Westminster Abbey.
- February 27 – Queen Elizabeth I establishes the Church of England, with the Act of Uniformity 1558 and the Act of Supremacy 1558. The Oath of Supremacy is reinstated.
- March 23 – Emperor Gelawdewos of Ethiopia, defending his lands against the invasion of Nur ibn Mujahid, Sultan of Harar, is killed in battle. His brother, Menas, succeeds him as king.
- March 31 – The Westminster Conference 1559 opens at Westminster Hall in London with nine leading Catholic churchmen, and nine Protestant reformers of the Church of England. The conference adjourns on April 3 for Easter and never reconvenes.

=== April–June ===
- April 3 – Peace of Cateau Cambrésis: After two days of negotiations, France makes peace with England and Spain, ending the Italian War of 1551–59. France gives up most of its gains in Italy (including Savoy), retaining only Saluzzo, but keeps the three Lorraine bishoprics of Metz, Toul, and Verdun, and the formerly English town of Calais.
- May 2 – John Knox returns from exile to Scotland, to become the leader of the beginning Scottish Reformation.
- May 8 – Queen Elizabeth I of England gives royal assent to the Act of Supremacy 1558 (requiring any person taking public or church office in England to swear allegiance to the English monarch as Supreme Governor of the Church of England) and to the Act of Uniformity 1558 (requiring all persons in England to attend Anglican services on penalty of a fine for noncompliance).
- May 13 – At Basel, the body of Dutch Anabaptist leader David Joris is exhumed and burned, following his posthumous conviction of heresy.
- June 11 – Scottish Reformation: A Protestant mob, incited by the preaching of John Knox, sacks St Andrews Cathedral.
- June 22 – King Philip II of Spain and the 14-year-old Elisabeth of Valois are married in Spain, having married by proxy in January.

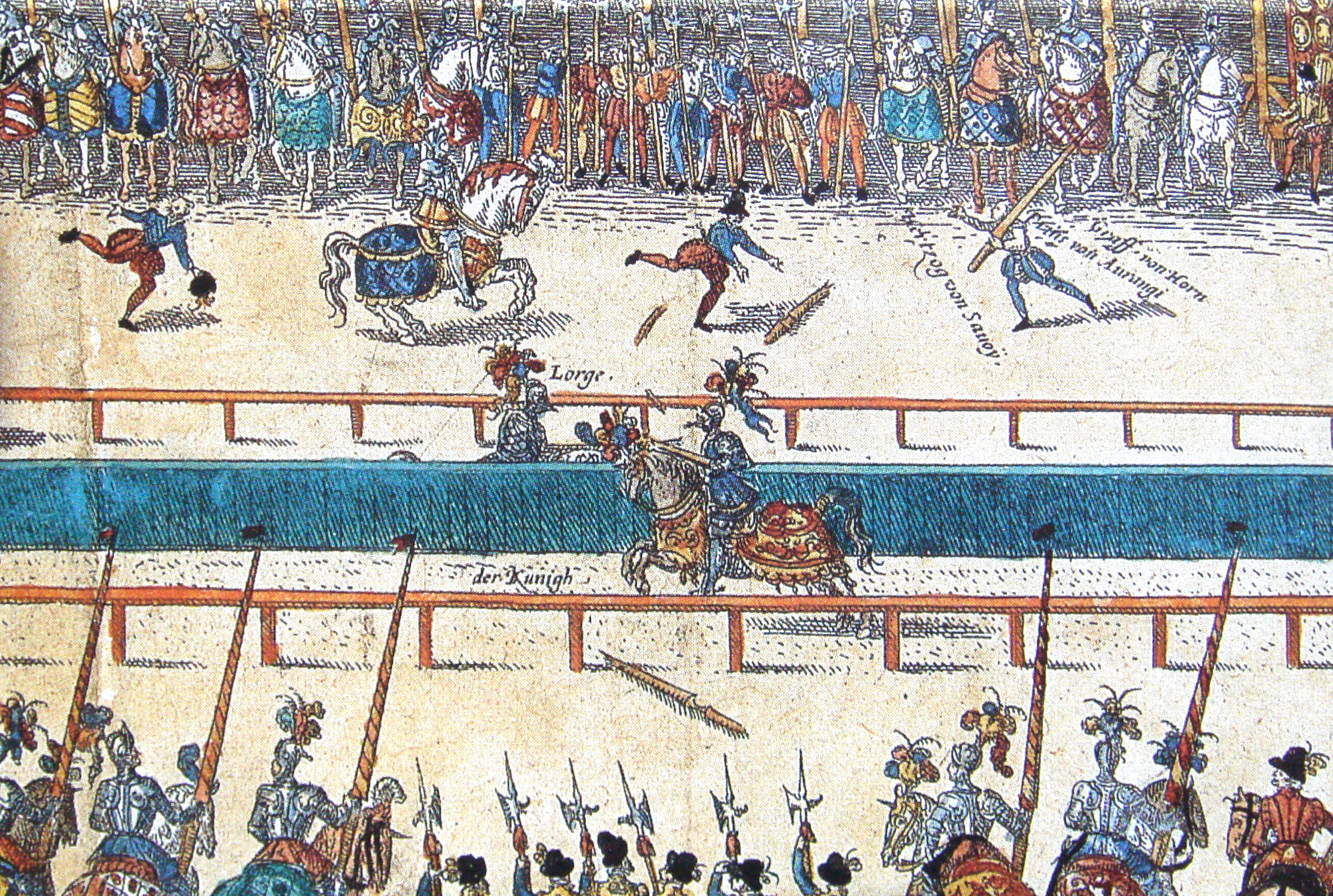
The fatal tournament between King Henry and Lord Montgomery

- June 30 – King Henry II of France participates in a jousting tournament at the Place des Vosges in Paris, where French nobles are celebrating the marriage of Princess Elisabeth to King Philip of Spain. During competition against Gabriel de Lorges, Count of Montgomery, commander of King Henry's bodyguards, the Garde Écossaise, King Henry is struck in the eye by a splinter from Montgomery's lance and fatally injured. Henry survives for 10 days without treatment until dying from sepsis.

=== July–September ===
- July 10 – Francis II becomes King of France following the death of his father, Henry II. Members of the House of Guise and the new king's mother Catherine de' Medici dispute control over the kingdom.
- July 25 – The Articles of Leith are signed in Edinburgh between the Protestant Lords of the Congregation and the Roman Catholic representatives of the Scottish regent, Mary of Guise, the widow of King James V, who is ruling on behalf of her daughter, the 17-year-old Mary, Queen of Scots. The Lords, who have occupied Edinburgh since June, withdraw their troops in return for the Scottish crown's agreement to not interfere with the practice of Protestantism in Scotland.
- July 31 – Pope Paul IV authorizes the creation of the University of Douai (which will later become the University of Lille).
- August 15 – Led by Don Tristán de Luna y Arellano, a Spanish missionary colony of 1,500 men, on 13 ships, arrives from Vera Cruz at Pensacola Bay, founding the oldest European settlement in the mainland U.S. (St. Augustine is founded in 1565.)
- August 18 – Pope Paul IV, leader of the Roman Catholic Church since 1555, dies at the age of 83 after a reign of four years. The office of the Pope remains vacant until almost the end of the year before a successor is chosen.
- September 4 – Gorkha state is established by Dravya Shah, beating local Khadka kings, which is the origin of the current country of Nepal.
- September 5 – The papal conclave to elect a new pope opens 18 days after the death of Pope Paul IV at the Apostolic Palace in Rome with 47 of the 55 Roman Catholic cardinals present. The conclave lasts 101 days before a successor to Pope Paul is elected.
- September 19 – Just weeks after arrival at Pensacola, the Spanish missionary colony is decimated by a hurricane that kills hundreds, sinks five ships, with a galleon, and grounds a caravel; the 1,000 survivors divide to relocate/resupply the settlement, but suffer famine & attacks, and abandon the effort in 1561.
- September 21 – Francis II of France is crowned at Reims. The crown is too heavy for him, and has to be held in place by his nobles.
- September 25 – At the age of 12, Petru cel Tânăr (Peter the Younger) is named as the new Prince of Wallachia at the capital, Târgoviște (now in Romania) after the death of his father, Mircea the Shepherd. In response, members of Wallachian nobility (boyars) opposed to Mircea's rule launch the first of three attempts to take the throne, fighting battles at Românești, Șerpătești and Boiani.

=== October–December ===
- October 24 – Backed by Ottoman Empire troops, the army of Wallachia defeats the boyars at the battle of Boiani. The Ottoman central government at Constantinople confirms Petru as the rightful ruler of the principality within the Empire.
- October 27 – Frederick III is terminated from his post as Duke of Legnica on orders of Ferdinand I, Holy Roman Emperor. The Emperor Ferdinand orders Frederick placed under house arrest, and restores Frederick's son, Henry XI as Duke of Legnica.
- November 5 – In Scotland, Crichton Castle, home of the powerful Earl of Bothwell, is besieged and captured in an attack by the Earl of Arran.
- November 6 – The Ottoman Empire ends its attempt to wrest control of the island of Bahrain from Portuguese control, after a siege of Manama Castle that began on July 2.
- December 25 – After a conclave of almost four months, Giovanni Angelo Medici is elected as the 224th pope, and takes the name Pope Pius IV.

=== Date unknown ===
- The University of Geneva is founded by John Calvin.
- John Calvin publishes the final edition of the Institutes of the Christian Religion.
- Oda Nobunaga wins control of his native province of Owari.
- Margaret of Parma becomes Governor of the Netherlands, in place of her brother, King Philip II of Spain.
- Jean Nicot, French ambassador to Portugal, introduces tobacco to the French court in the form of snuff, and describes its medicinal properties. The active ingredient in tobacco is later named "nicotine" in his honor.
- Pope Paul IV promulgates the Pauline Index, an early version of the Index Librorum Prohibitorum.
- The German Duchy of Württemberg establishes a compulsory education system for boys.
- The first generation of the Protestant Reformation is completed, according to some historians.

== Births ==
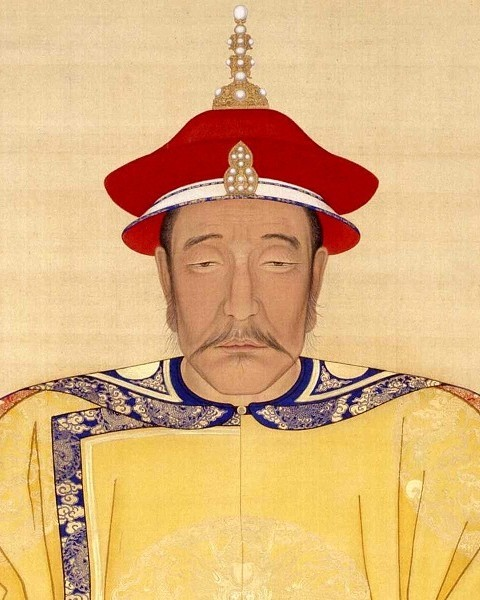
Emperor Nurhaci born on February 19

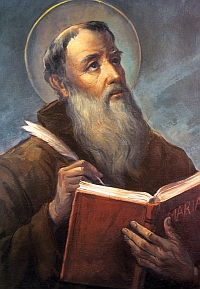
Lawrence of Brindisi born on July 22

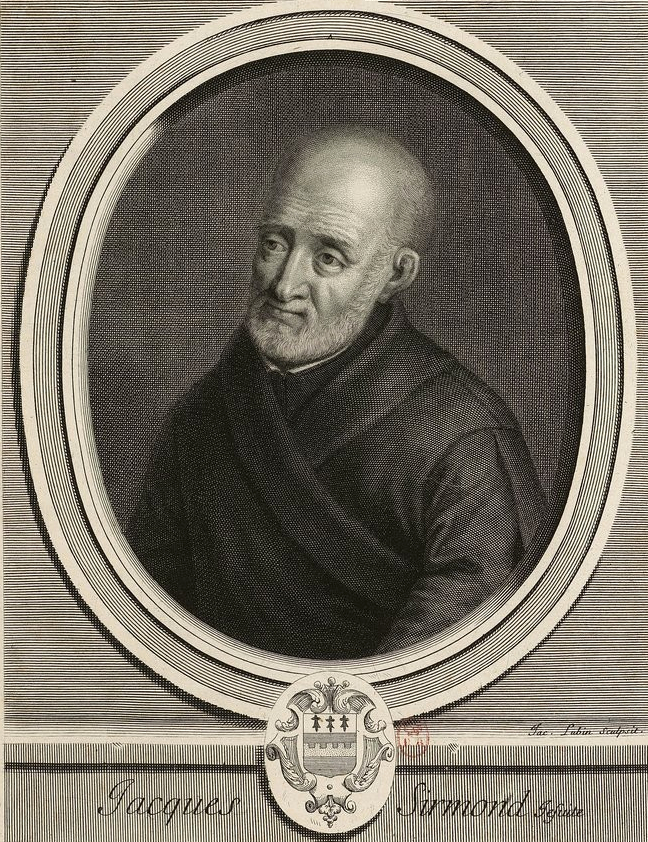
Jacques Sirmond born on October 12

- January 1 – Virginia Eriksdotter, Swedish noble (d. 1633)
- January 8 – William Helyar, English chaplain (d. 1645)
- January 25 – Aleixo de Menezes, Roman Catholic archbishop (d. 1617)
- February 7 – Catherine de Bourbon, Princess of Navarre and Duchess consort of Lorraine (d. 1604)
- February 18 – Isaac Casaubon, French-born classical scholar (d. 1614)
- February 19 – Philip II of Baden-Baden (d. 1588)
- February 21 – Nurhaci, Chinese emperor (d. 1626)
- March 12 – Christoph Brouwer, Dutch historian (d. 1617)
- March 16 – Amar Singh I, eldest son and successor of Maharana Pratap of Mewar (d. 1620)
- March 26 – Wolf Dietrich Raitenau, Prince-Bishop of Salzburg (d. 1617)
- May 4 – Alice Spencer, Countess of Derby, Baroness Ellesmere and Viscountess Brackley (d. 1637)
- May 12
  - Stanisław Radziwiłł, Grand Marshal of Lithuania (d. 1599)
  - Johann Georg Gödelmann, German demonologist (d. 1611)
- July 2 – Margareta Brahe, Swedish political activist (d. 1638)
- July 22 – Lawrence of Brindisi, Italian saint (d. 1619)
- July 27 – Countess Palatine Barbara of Zweibrücken-Neuburg and Countess consort of Oettingen-Oettingen (d. 1618)
- August 18 – Frederik van den Bergh, Dutch soldier in the Eighty Years' War (d. 1618)
- August 24 or September 1556 – Sophia Brahe, Danish astronomer, horticulturalist (d. 1643)
- September 21 – Cigoli, Italian painter (d. 1613)
- September 15 – Edmond Richer, French theologian (d. 1631)
- October 12 or October 22 – Jacques Sirmond, French Jesuit scholar (d. 1651)
- November 11 – Tokuhime, Japanese noble (d. 1636)
- November 12 – Yaza Datu Kalaya, Crown Princess of Burma (d. 1603)
- November 13 – Al-Mansur al-Qasim, Imam of Yemen (d. 1620)
- November 15 – Albert VII of Austria, Governor of the Low Countries (d. 1621)
- December 14 – Lupercio Leonardo de Argensola, Spanish writer (d. 1613)
- date unknown
  - George Chapman, English dramatist (d. 1634)
  - Ikeda Motosuke, Japanese military commander (d. 1584)
  - John Penry, Welsh Protestant martyr (d. 1593)
  - Honinbo Sansa, Japanese player of Go (d. 1623)
  - John Spenser, president of Corpus Christi College, Oxford (d. 1614)

== Deaths ==
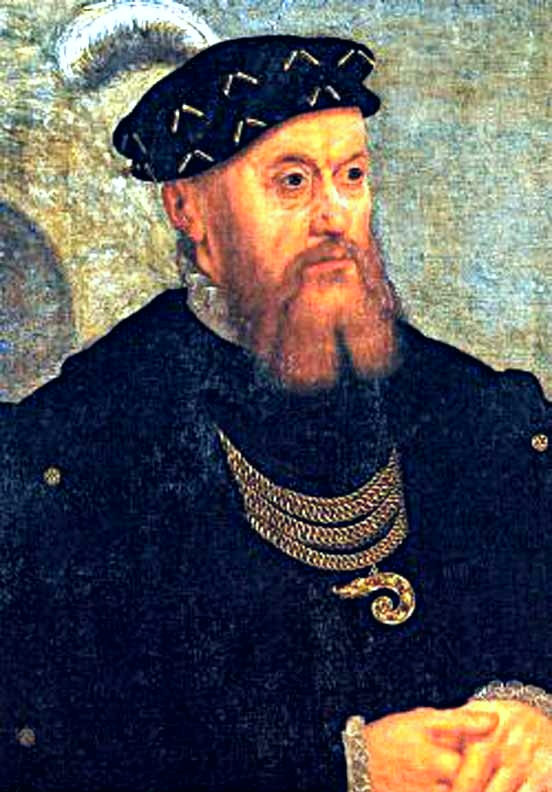
King Christian III of Denmark and Norway died on New Year's Day, January 1, 1559

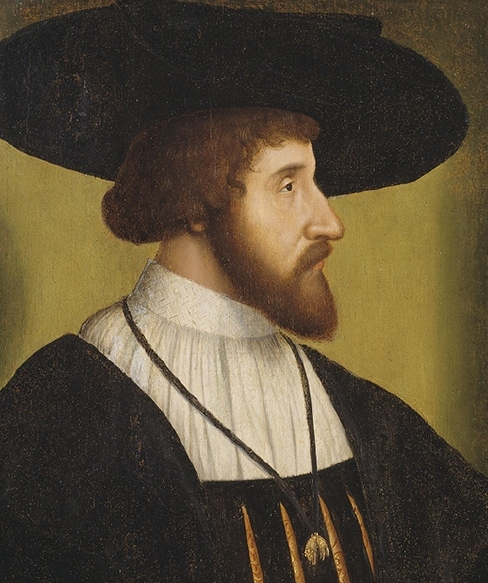
King Christian II of Denmark, Norway and Sweden died on January 25, 1559

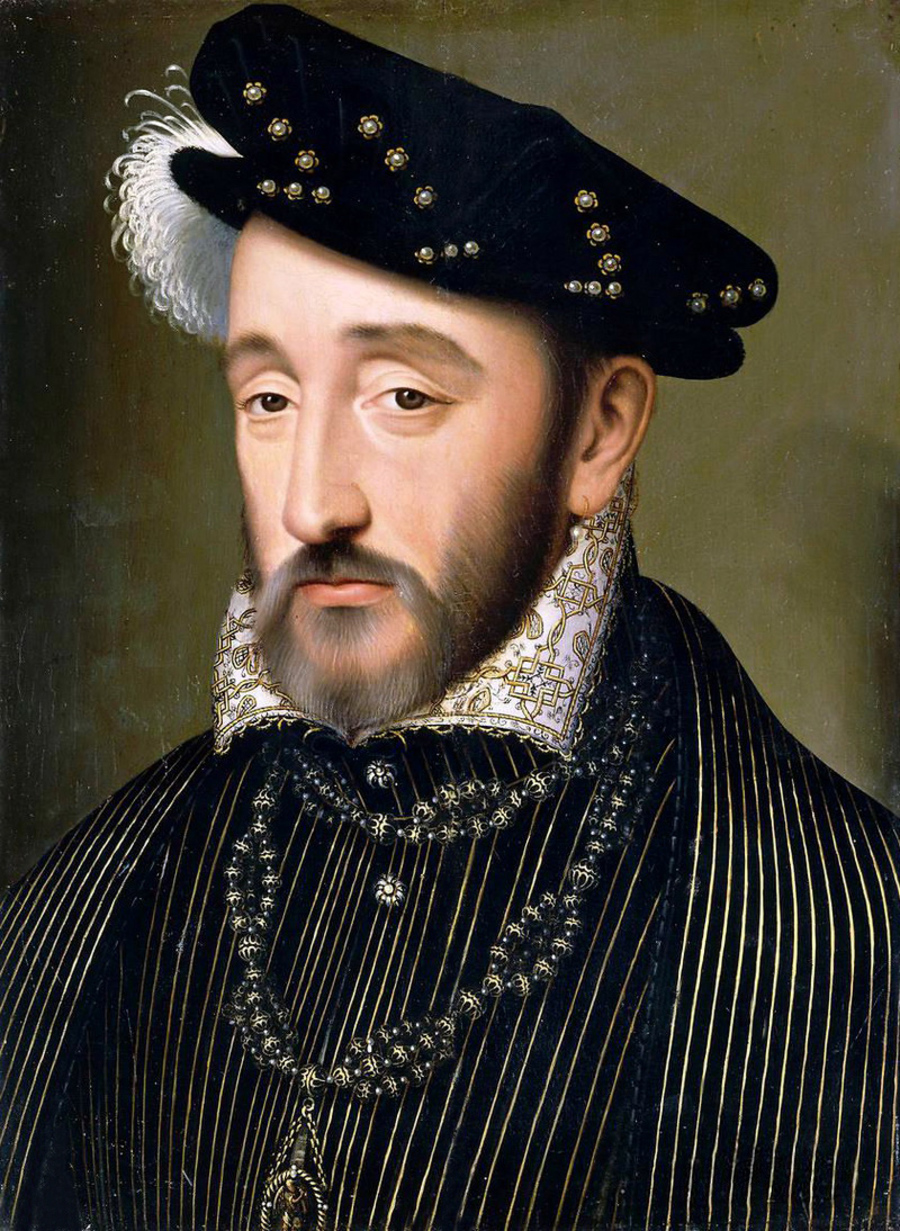
King Henry II of France died on July 10, 1559

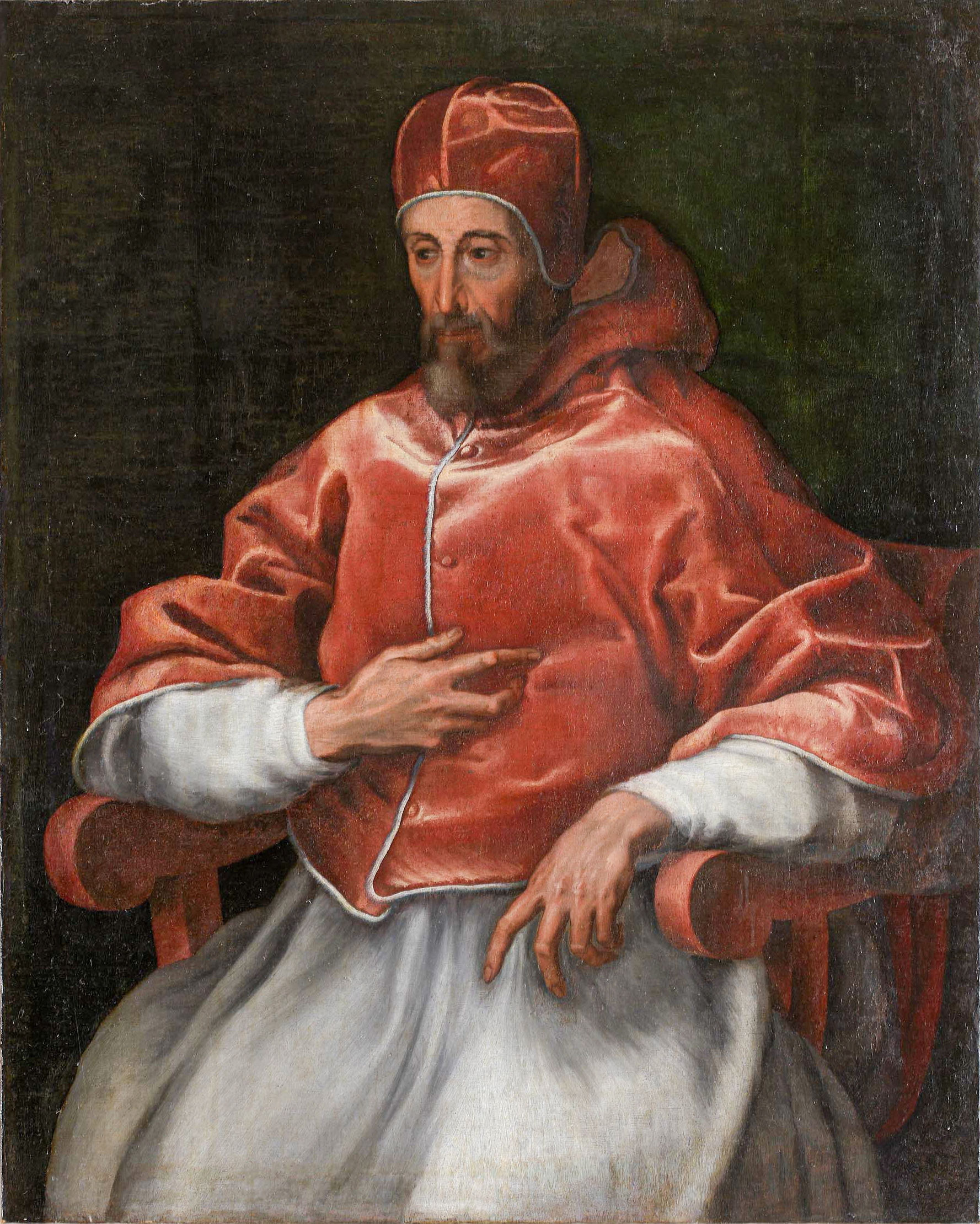
Pope Paul IV died on August 18, 1559

- January – Christina Gyllenstierna, leading opponent of King Christian II of Denmark and Norway (b. 1494)
- January 1 – King Christian III of Denmark and Norway (b. 1503)
- January 25 – King Christian II of Denmark, Norway and Sweden (b. 1481)
- February 12 – Prince-elector Otto Henry of the Palatinate (b. 1502)
- March 8 – Thomas Tresham, English Catholic politician
- March 13 – Johann Gropper, German Catholic cardinal (b. 1503)
- March 16 – Anthony St. Leger, Lord Deputy of Ireland (b. 1496)
- March 23 – Emperor Gelawdewos of Ethiopia (in battle) (b. 1522)
- March 30 – Adam Ries, German mathematician (b. 1492)
- June 3 – Elisabeth of Nassau-Siegen, German noblewoman (b. 1488)
- July 10 – King Henry II of France (jousting accident) (b. 1519)
- August 18 – Pope Paul IV (b. 1476)
- September 7 – Robert Estienne, French printer (b. 1503)
- September 15 – Isabella Jagiellon, queen consort of Hungary (d. 1519)
- October 2 – Jacquet of Mantua, French composer (b. 1483)
- October 3 – Ercole II d'Este, Duke of Ferrara, Italian noble (b. 1508)
- October 4 – Philip III, Count of Nassau-Weilburg (b. 1504)
- October 6 – William I, Count of Nassau-Siegen (b. 1487)
- November 5 – Kanō Motonobu, Japanese painter (b. 1476)
- November 10 – Jacob Milich, German astronomer and mathematician (b. 1501)
- November 18 – Cuthbert Tunstall, English church leader (b. 1474)
- November 20 – Frances Grey, Duchess of Suffolk, English noblewoman and claimant to the throne of England (b. 1517)
- November 26 – Adolph of Nassau-Saarbrücken, Count of Nassau (b. 1526)
- December 17 – Irene di Spilimbergo, Italian Renaissance poet and painter (b. 1538)
- December 31 – Owen Oglethorpe, deposed English bishop
- date unknown
  - Realdo Colombo, Italian surgeon and anatomist (b. 1516)
  - Elizabeth Wilford, English merchant and company founder
  - Father Francis of Aberdeen, Catholic Trinitarian friar
  - Leonard Digges, English mathematician and surveyor (b. c. 1515)
  - Conn O'Neill, 1st Earl of Tyrone, Irish rebel (b. 1480)
  - Wen Zhengming, Chinese painter (b. 1470)
