= Londina Illustrata =

Book by W. Herbert and R. Wilkinson

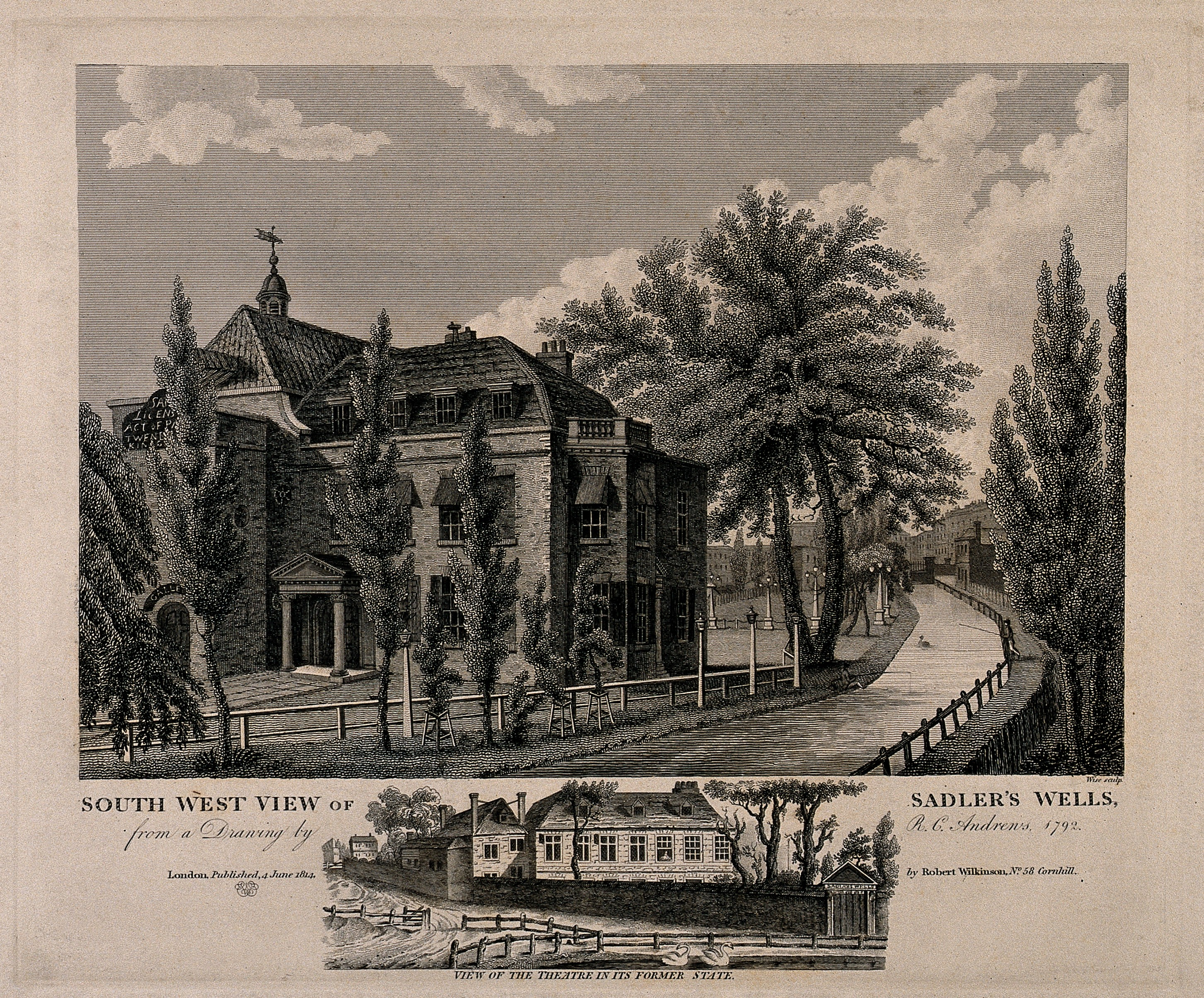
"South West View of Sadler's Wells", Londina Illustrata, 1814. From a drawing by R.C. Andrews, 1792.

Londina Illustrata. Graphic and Historic Memorials of Monasteries, Churches, Chapels, Schools, Charitable Foundations, Palaces, Halls, Courts, Processions, Places of Early Amusement and Modern & Present Theatres, In the Cities and Suburbs of London & Westminster was a book published in two volumes by Robert Wilkinson in 1819 & 1825, that had initially been released with William Herbert as groups of engravings between 1808 and 1819 which featured topographical illustrations by some of the foremost engravers and illustrators of the day, of the cities of London and Westminster, the county of Middlesex and some areas south of the River Thames, then in Surrey, such as Southwark.

Most of the plates carry names of the draughtsman and engraver. A few early artists are included such as Wenceslaus Hollar. More recent draughtsmen included Robert Blemmell Schnebbelie, Frederick Nash, William Capon, George Jones, H. Gardner, George Shepherd, William Goodman, C.J.M. Whichelo, John Carter, Fellows, C. Westmacott, E. Burney, Bartholomew Howlett, Thomas H. Shepherd, Banks, Ravenhill, William Oram. Engravers include James Stow, T. Dale, Bartholomew Howlett, John Whichelo, W. Wise, Samuel Rawle, T. Bourne, H. Cook, M. Springsguth, Wenceslaus Hollar, Joseph Skelton, Israel Silvestre, Richard Sawyer, S. Springsguth junr., Taylor.
