= Robert Blemmell Schnebbelie =

English painter and illustrator

- Born: 16 September 1781; Canterbury
- Died: 1847 (aged 65–66); Camden
- Occupation: Artist
- Parent(s): Jacob Schnebbelie, Caroline Schnebbelie

Robert Blemmell (Note: Sometimes (erroneously?) spelled as Blemmel or Bremmell in sources.) Schnebbelie (16 September 1781 – 1847 (Note: Schnebbelie's year of death is stated by many sources to have been 1849, based on John Bowyer Nichols's statement that it happened "about the year 1849"; however, the records of St Pancras parish state that he died in 1847, which other sources verify, so Nichols's later date is clearly mistaken.)) was an English painter and illustrator. He produced numerous paintings and drawings of London's topography during the first half of the 19th century. He was born in Canterbury in 1781 as the second son of Jacob Schnebbelie, a confectioner who later became a noted antiquarian draughtsman employed by the Society of Antiquaries of London.

When Jacob died at age 31, leaving his family in poverty, Robert took up his father's profession and continued his work drawing old buildings in London. He displayed artistic talent from an early age; in 1795 his mother Caroline wrote to John Bowyer Nichols, one of the editors of the Gentleman's Magazine and a benefactor of the family following Jacob's untimely death, to say that she was "taking the liberty of sending you my son, Robert with a few Sketches of his own performance for your inspection". She asked Nichols to consider employing her son "if you think him Capable of copying any little matter for the Mag[azine]".

The adult Schnebbelie occasionally exhibited works at the Royal Academy of Arts between 1803 and 1821. Engravings based on his drawings were widely published; he made the drawings for many of the plates in Robert Wilkinson's Londina Illustrata (1808–1825), David Hughson's Description of London and the Gentleman's Magazine, among others.

Schnebbelie was described posthumously by John Bowyer Nichols as being "of rather weak intellect, and very capricious in the employment of his time." The death of his mother was said to have affected him to the point that he was "scarcely able to take care of himself." He died in a state of acute poverty in Camden Town in 1847. Nichols wrote that "to the horror of his few friends, his body was found in a lodging, almost destitute of furniture, after having been some days dead; and it was too evident that his death was hastened by privation." According to Samuel Redgrave, Schnebbelie died of starvation.

Views of Schnebbelie's artistic merit vary; he has been described by the Canadian art historian Robert R. Wark as "gifted", and by Redgrave as "a good draftsman [sic]", though Martin Hardie is less generous, describing both Schnebbelies as "painstaking but niggling in their draughtsmanship" and their work as "not often ris[ing] above a level of good hack work." A number of his works are on display as part of the collections of the Museum of London, the City of London Corporation's Guildhall Art Gallery and the Huntington Museum of Art, among other institutions.

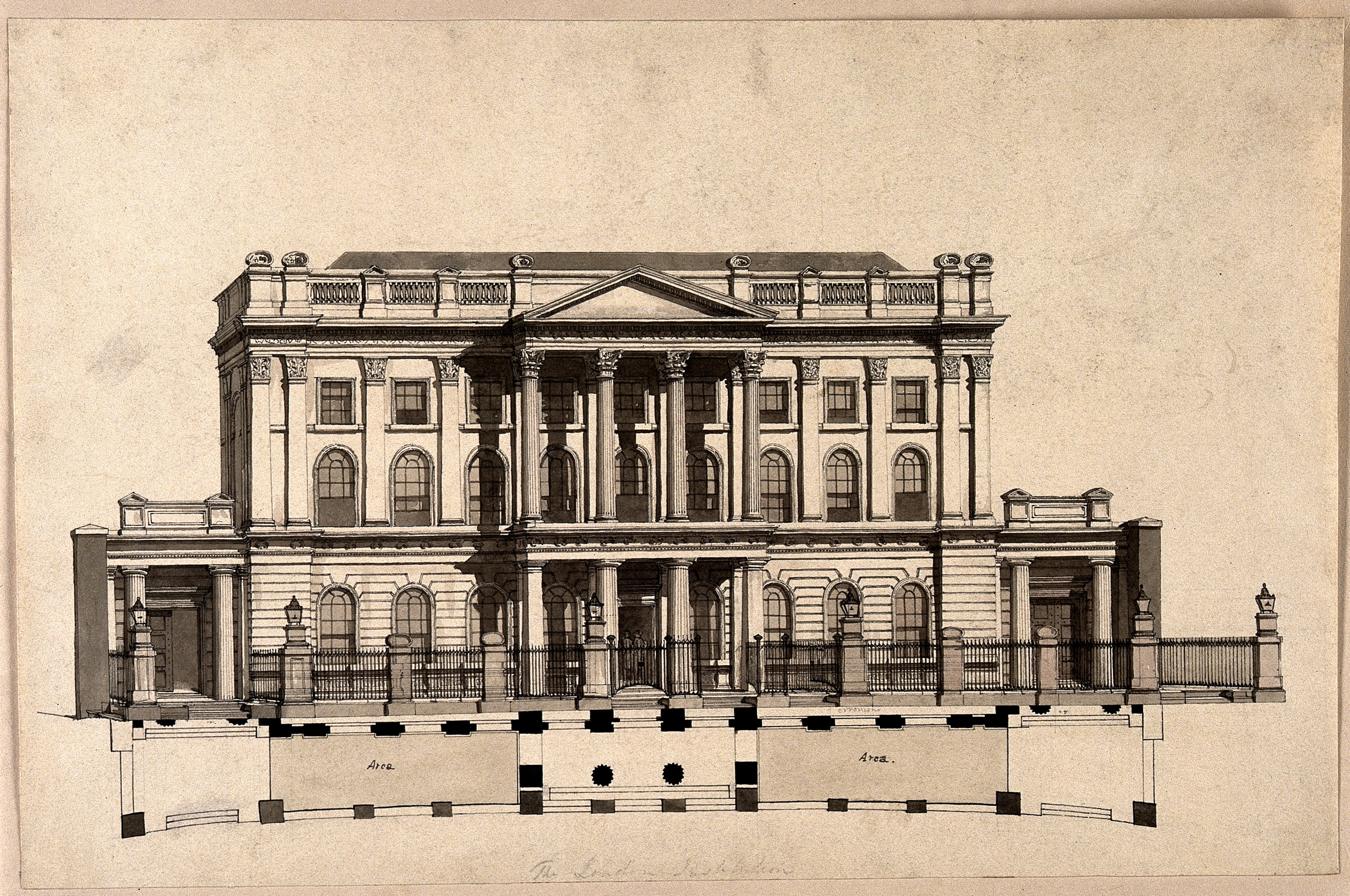
The London Institution, Moorfields, London, 1819 (attributed)

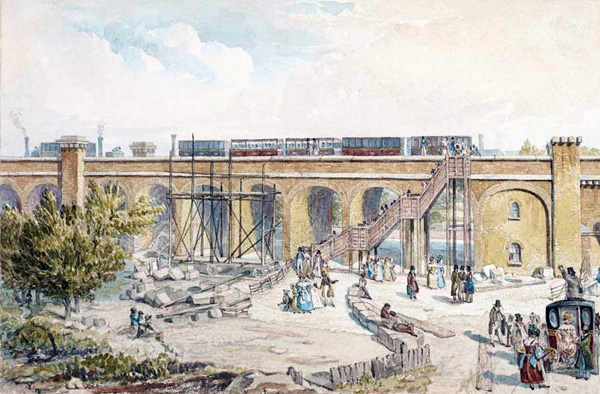
Spa Road railway station, Bermondsey, 1836

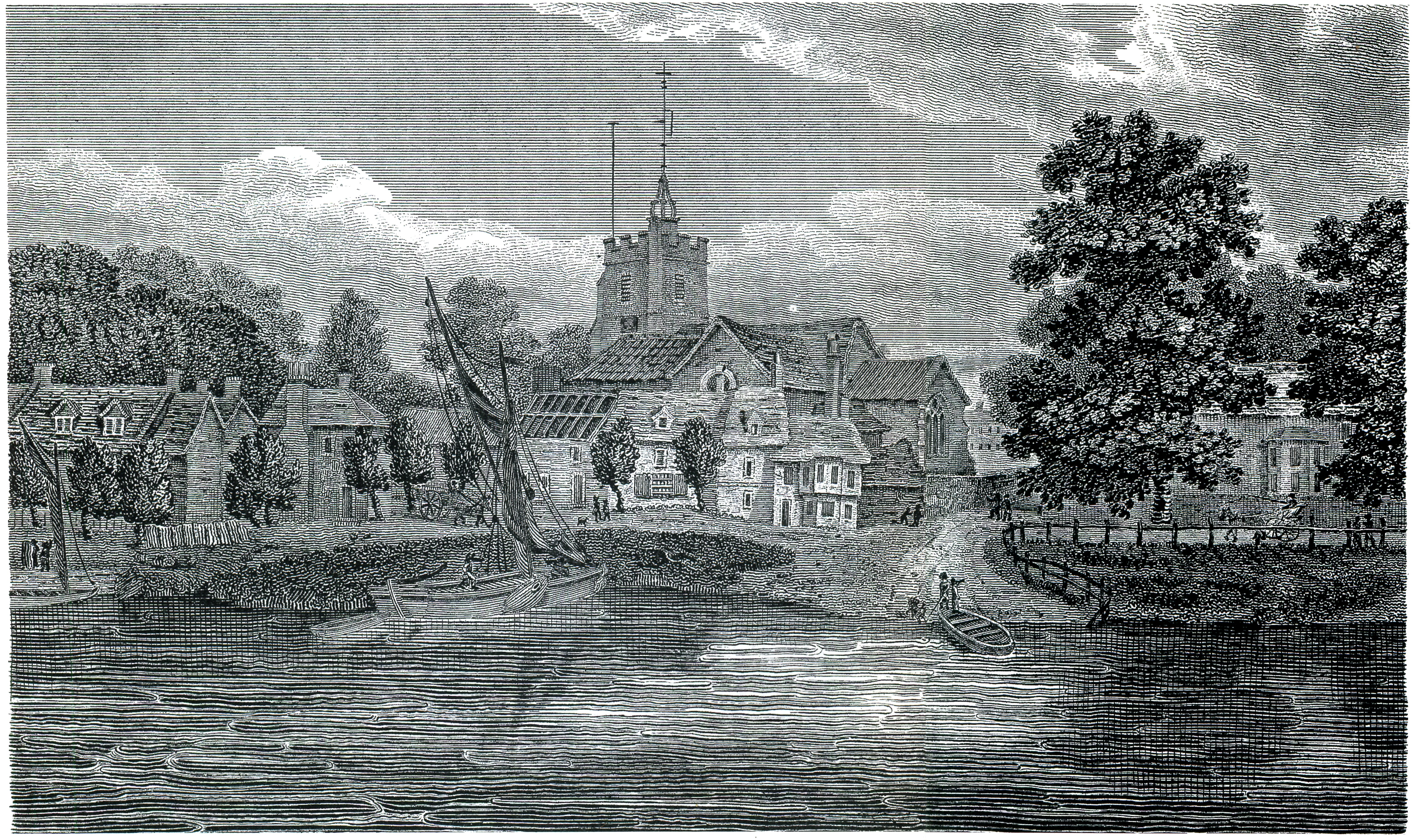
Engraving of St Nicholas Church, Chiswick by Robert Blemell after his father Jacob Schnebbelie, 1807
