= Whichelo =

Whichelo is a surname, and may refer to:

- John Whichelo (1784–1865), British painter, great-uncle of Nellie Whichelo
- Nellie Whichelo (1862–1959), British textile designer
- Philip Whichelo (1905–1989), British painter

== See also ==
- Abiell Whichello (1683–1747), English composer and organist
