= Father Francis =

Father Francis may refer to:

- Father Francis (Hollyoaks), a fictional character in the British soap opera Hollyoaks
- Father Francis of Aberdeen, Catholic Trinitarian
- Francis P. Duffy, a Canadian American soldier, Catholic priest and military chaplain
- Father Francis D. Duffy Statue and Duffy Square
- Francis Xavier Morgan, a Spanish and British Catholic priest
- Disappearance of Father Francis, a Catholic Tamil priest
- Pope Francis, former head of the Catholic Church
