= Samuel Rawle =

English engraver (1771–1860)

Samuel Rawle (1771–1860) was an English topographical engraver and draughtsman.

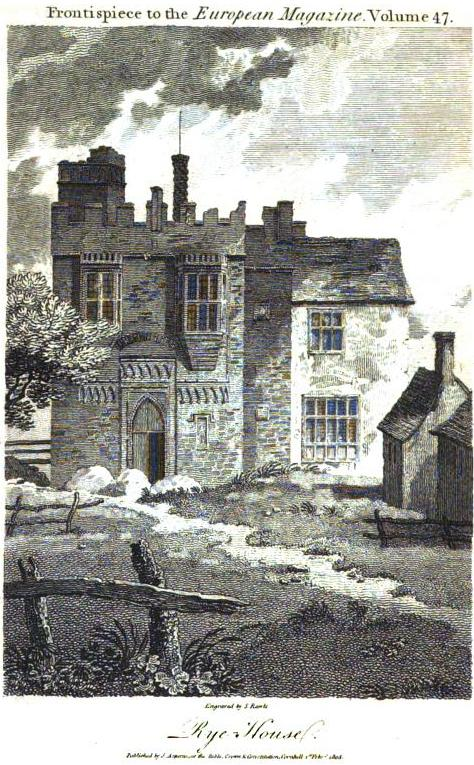
Rye House, Hertfordshire, 1805.

He practised in London. From 1798, he engraved many plates for the European Magazine and Gentleman's Magazine. Later he was employed on some of the major topographical publications of the time. These included: James Cavanah Murphy's Arabian Antiquities of Spain, 1816; Robert Surtees's History and Antiquities of the County Palatine of Durham, 1816; Robert Wilkinson's Londina Illustrata, 1819; James Hakewill, Picturesque Tour of Italy, 1820; Thomas Frognall Dibdin's Bibliographical, Antiquarian and Picturesque Tour in France and Germany, 1821; and Thomas Dunham Whitaker's Richmondshire, 1823. Rawle exhibited landscapes at the Royal Academy in 1801 and 1806. He died in November 1860 and was buried on the western side of Highgate Cemetery.
