= George Ashby (antiquary) =

English antiquary

George Ashby (1724–1808) was an English antiquary and sometime president of St John's College, Cambridge.

== Life ==
Ashby was born in Red Lion Street, Clerkenwell, London in 1724. Educated at Croydon, Westminster, and Eton, he entered St John's College, Cambridge, on 30 October 1740, and took the degree of B.A., in 1744, of M.A. in 1748, when he was admitted fellow of St John's, and of B.D. in 1756. He was presented by a relative to the rectory of Hungerton, in Leicestershire, in 1754, and in 1759 to that of Twyford in the same county; he held both benefices in conjunction until 1767, when he resigned the former, and in 1769 he gave up the latter on his election to the presidency or vice-mastership of St John's College.

About 1775, when he became a fellow of the Society of Antiquaries, he appears to have resigned his official connection with Cambridge, where he supported academic reform too vigorously to obtain further preferment. Among other changes, he advocated the right of the fellows to marry. At the same time he accepted the college living of Barrow, Suffolk, to which John Ross, the bishop of Exeter, an intimate friend and patron of Ashby, added the rectory of Stansfield in 1780. In 1793 his sight began to fail, and shortly afterwards he became totally blind. He died of paralysis at Barrow on 12 June 1808, and was buried in the parish church, where a monument was erected to his memory.

== Works ==
Although Ashby published little, his varied learning was the admiration of the best known literary antiquaries of the 18th century, all of whom he reckoned among his friends. He was intimate for some years with the poet Thomas Gray, and portions of his voluminous correspondence with Bishop Percy, Richard Gough, John Nichols, William Herbert, and the Rev. James Granger, were printed in John Nichols' Illustrations of the Literary History of the Eighteenth Century and in Granger's Letters. He dealt with a wide range of antiquarian topics there; in one letter he proposed an emendation of a line in Hamlet, in another he pointed out errors in the Biographia Britannica, which he had read from end to end, and in a third he discussed some vexed questions of numismatics.

He was a regular contributor to the Gentleman's Magazine; he added notes to Nichols's Literary Anecdotes under the initials of T. F. (Dr. Taylor's Friend); he greatly aided Nichols in his History of Leicestershire, to which he contributed an elaborate essay on the Roman Milliary at Leicester; and he gave material assistance to Daines Barrington, when preparing his Observations on the Statutes. He published a dissertation on a coin of Nerva newly discovered at Colchester in Archaeologia. Some volumes of his manuscript collections, together with numerous letters on antiquarian themes, are preserved among the Cole, Egerton, and Additional manuscripts at the British Library. They include notes on archery, an essay on parish registers, and extracts and notes on old English and French plays, of which the English plays are mainly early 16th-century interludes. His valuable library, which was bequeathed to Thomas Lyus, his amanuensis, was sold soon after his death to a bookseller at Bury, and was rapidly dispersed.
