= Bartholomew Howlett =

English draughtsman and engraver

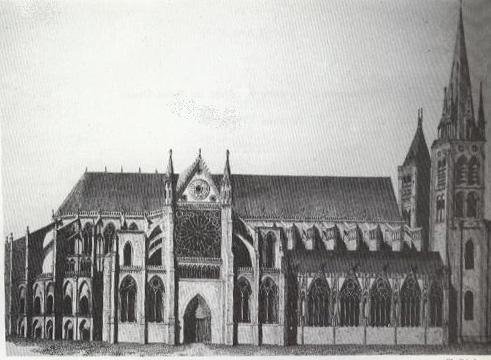
Abbey of Saint-Denys (engraved by Howlett from drawings by Major George Anderson, 1812).

Bartholomew Howlett (1767–1827) was an English draughtsman and engraver.

Howlett was born in Louth in Lincolnshire in 1767. He was the son, by his first marriage, of Bartholomew Howlett, a native of Norfolk, who was settled at Louth. Howlett came to London and served as apprentice to James Heath, the engraver.

He worked mainly on topographical and antiquarian works. In 1801 he engraved and published A Selection of Views in the County of Lincoln, with seventy-five plates from drawings by Thomas Girtin, John Nash, and others, of which a later edition appeared in 1805. He also executed plates for Wilkinson's Londina Illustrata, Bentham's History of Ely, Frost's Notices of Hull, George Anderson's Plan and Views of the Abbey Royal of St. Denys, the Gentleman's Magazine, and similar works. In 1817 he made a number of drawings for a projected History of Clapham, of which one number only was published.

When the Royal Hospital of St. Katherine, near the Tower of London, was pulled down in 1826, Howlett made a number of drawings, with a view to a publication, which never appeared. He made drawings of about a thousand seals of English monastic and religious houses for the notable antiquary John Caley (d. 1834).

Subsequently, he fell into financial difficulty, and died at Newington, Surrey (now in Greater London) on 18 December 1827, aged 60.
