= Arthur John Strutt =

English painter

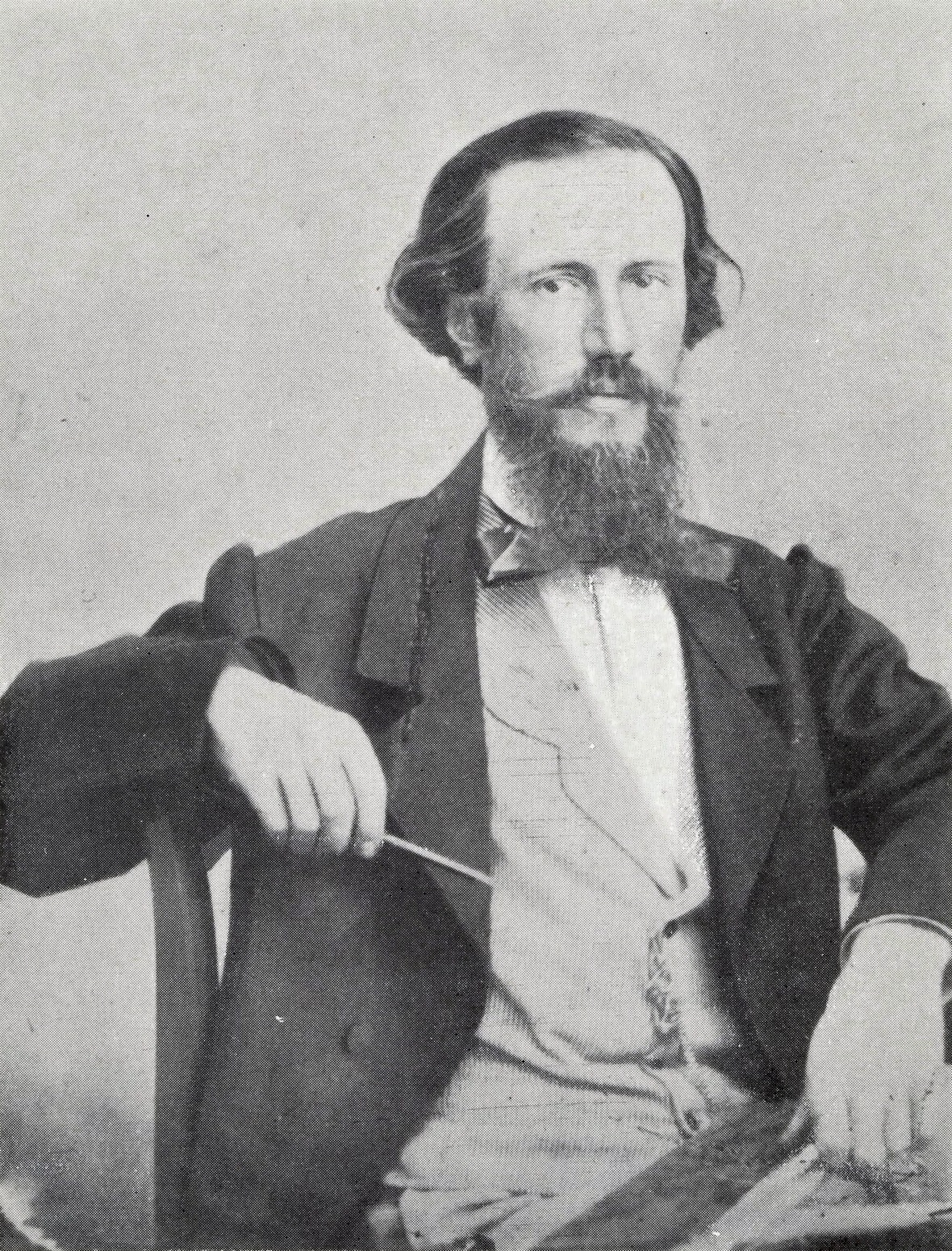
- Portrait of Arthur John Strutt
- Born: 1819; Chelmsford, England
- Died: 1888 (aged 68–69); Rome
- Known for: painter, engraver, Campagna Romana

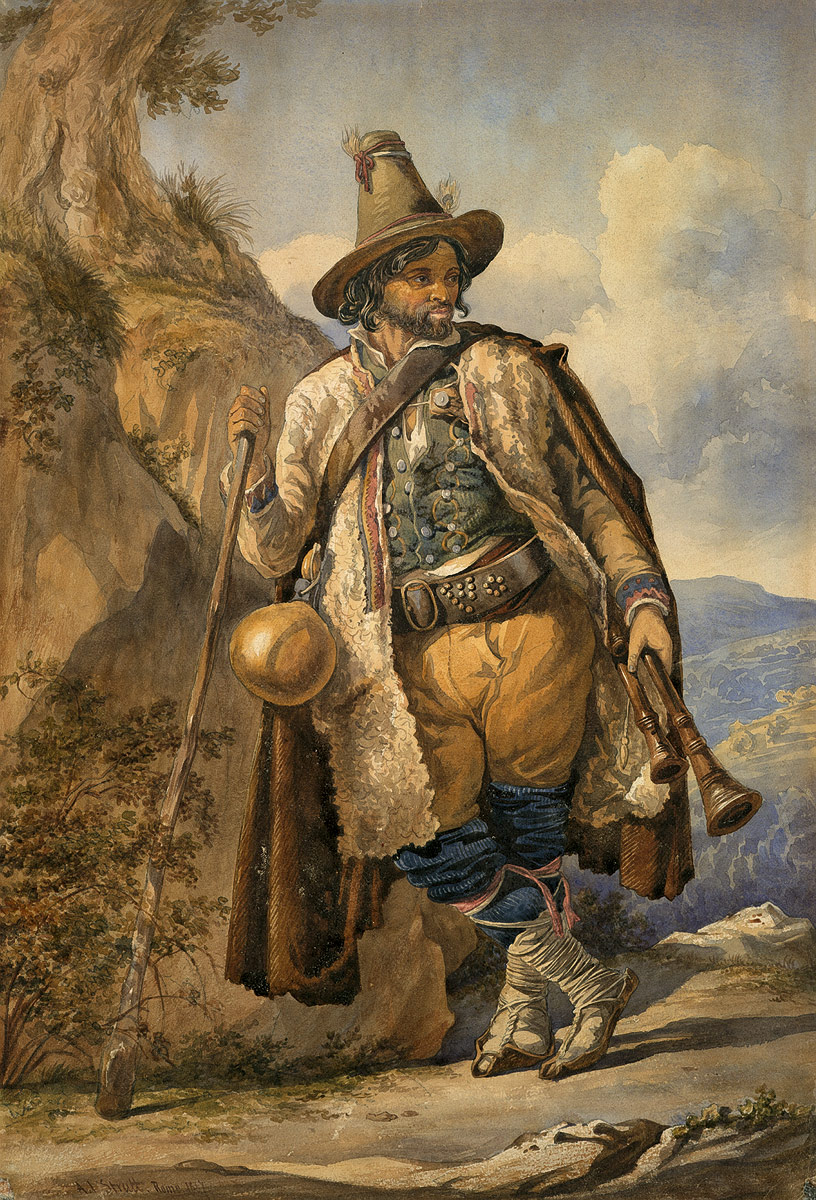
Arthur John Strutt, a bagpiper or pifferaro in the Campagna Romana; pencil and wash, 1847

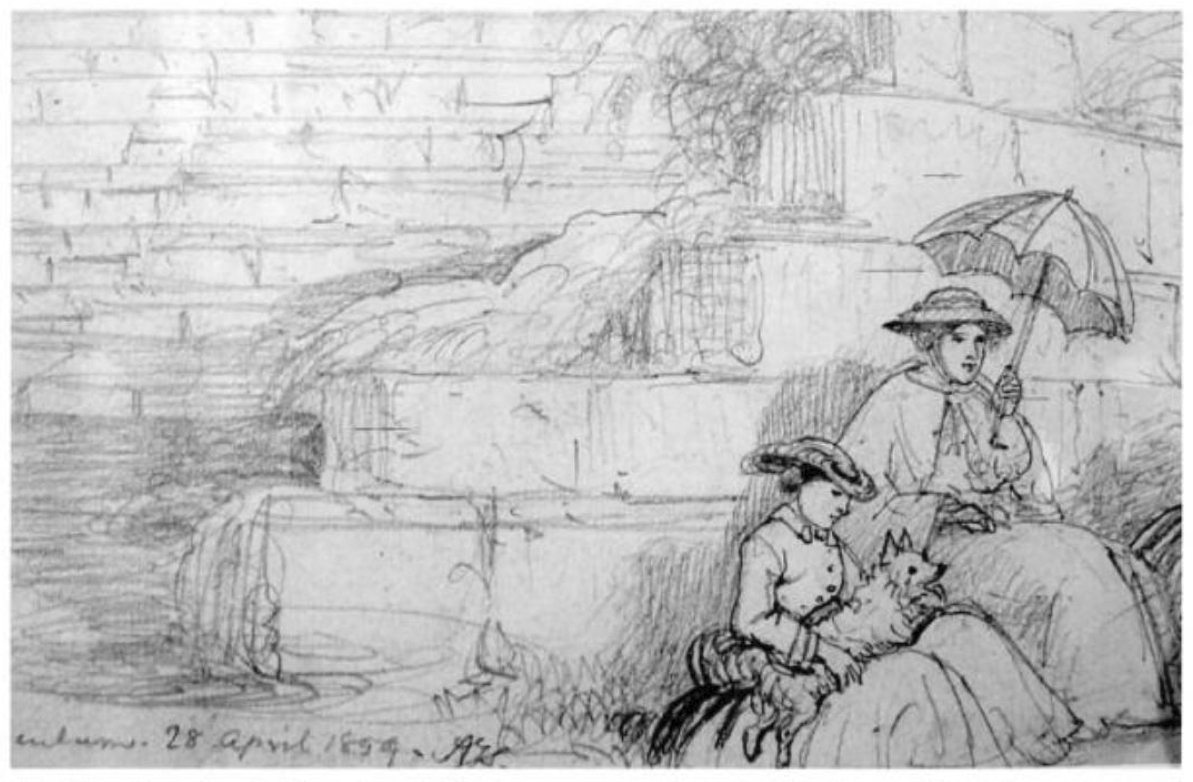
Two women in the Roman theatre of Tusculum, pencil drawing by Arthur John Strutt, 1859

Arthur John Strutt (1819–1888), was a British painter, engraver, writer, traveller and archaeologist.

== Life ==
Strutt was born in Chelmsford, in Essex in south-eastern England. He was the son of the landscape painter Jacob George Strutt (1790–1864) and the writer and traveller Elizabeth Strutt.

The elder Strutt moved to Lausanne in Switzerland in about 1830. From 1835 to 1837, accompanied by his son and pupil Arthur, he travelled in France and Switzerland, and later in Italy. They settled in Rome, where they opened a studio.

In 1841 Arthur travelled on foot through central and southern Italy and in Sicily. He and his friend, the poet William Jackson (otherwise unknown), started from the Porta San Giovanni of Rome on 30 April 1841, reaching Palermo on 15 December, and arriving back at Rome in July of the following year. An account of this journey is given in his A Pedestrian Tour in Calabria & Sicily published in London, in 1842.

In 1849, Strutt and his father had a studio at 52, via del Babuino, an address found both in the Roman Advertiser and, for Mrs. Strutt, in the address-book of Elizabeth Barrett Browning. In 1853 his studio was at 33, via del Mercede; he is described as "a very clever painter of landscapes and Roman costumes, and author of an interesting work on Calabria". In 1869 his studio was at 20, via di S. Basilio, and the description reads: "a very clever painter of landscapes, scenery about Rome, and groups of Roman peasantry and cattle; he has produced some large subjects of the Campagna, of its aqueducts, and the scenery along the Via Appia ... he is the author of an interesting work on Calabria". In 1881 the address is 81, via della Croce, and the description largely unchanged. Strutt died in Rome in 1888.

== Archaeology ==
From 1881 until his death, Strutt was an honorary inspector of antiquities at Lanuvium, on the recommendation of Rodolfo Lanciani; he was made an honorary citizen of the modern town of Lanuvio and elected to the Consiglio comunale or town council. His descriptions of Latin inscriptions in the area were published in the scientific periodical Notizie degli scavi di antichità of the Reale Accademia dei Lincei and elsewhere.

== Art works ==
Many of his paintings are of subjects from the Campagna Romana. A celebrated one depicts a meet of the Roman Hunt with King Umberto I. His sketchbooks are in the Huntington Library in San Marino, California.

== Published work ==
- A Pedestrian Tour in Calabria & Sicily. London: T.C. Newby, 1842.

Strutt became editor of the weekly Roman Advertiser, the first English-language paper of Italy, in succession to the founding editor, the Irish antiquary Charles Isidore Hemans (1817–1876). 106 issues of The Roman Advertiser: Journal of Science, Literature and the Fine Arts appeared between 24 October 1846 and 21 April 1849. It was published on Saturday evenings by the Monaldini bookshop at 79, Piazza di Spagna, and cost five baiocchi.
