= Charles Frost (antiquary) =

English lawyer and antiquary

- Born: 1781/2
- Died: 1862

Charles Frost FSA (1781?–1862) was an English lawyer and antiquary.

== Life ==
Born at Kingston upon Hull, Yorkshire, in 1781 or 1782, he was the son of Thomas Frost, a Hull solicitor He followed the same profession, and, as his father had been before him, was solicitor to the Hull Dock Company. He was elder brother to the writer and traveller Elizabeth Strutt.

Frost died at Hull, 5 September 1862, aged 80 or 81.

== Works ==
Frost studied the handwriting of the thirteenth and fourteenth centuries, and on 2 May 1822 he was elected a Fellow of the Society of Antiquaries. In 1827 he published by subscription Notices relative to the Early History of the Town and Port of Hull; .. with illustrations by Bartholomew Howlett. In it he claimed to show that the town commonly attributed to have been founded by Edward I (John Leland, William Camden and others), was expanded from an earlier habitation on the same site, named Wyke, which was separate from the place known as Myton to the west. The work was the subject of a long and flattering critique by Nicholas Harris Nicolas in the Retrospective Review for December 1827.

Another publication, also of local value, was his 'Address,’ 1831, delivered to the Hull Literary and Philosophical Society at the opening of the seventh session on 5 November 1830, in which he mentions various literary societies which had been promoted in the town during the preceding half-century, and gives brief biographical notices of most of the Hull author. A subsequent presidential address, delivered by him in 1852, was also published. Frost was president of the society ten times between 1830 and 1855; he served as president of the subscription library for twelve years, between 1827 and 1854, the laws being suspended so that he might occupy the position for five successive years, 1850–4, to enable him to carry into effect his scheme for the amalgamation of the two societies in a building in Albion Street.

He published two legal pamphlets. One was on the Propriety of making a remuneration to witnesses in civil actions for loss of time. … , published 1815. The other consisted of a letter to Thomas Thompson on the subject of 'Equalising the poor rates of Hull by assessing the shipping belonging to the port to the relief of the poor,’ published in 1820.

=== Publications ===
- Frost, Charles (1815), Considerations on the propriety of making a remuneration to witnesses in civil actions, for loss of time: and of allowing the same on the taxation of costs as between party and party : with some observations on the present system of taxing costs
- Frost, Charles (1827), Notices relative to the early history of the town and port of Hull, J.B. Nichols
- Frost, Charles (1831), An address delivered to the Literary and Philosophical Society at Kingston-upon-Hull at the opening of the seventh session, On Friday, November 5, 1830, I. Wilson
