= Jacob Schnebbelie =

Jacob Schnebbelie (30 August 1760 – 21 February 1792) was an English draughtsman, specialising in monuments and other historical subjects.

== Early life ==
Jacob Schnebbelie was born in Duke's Court, St Martin's Lane, London, on 30 August 1760. His father, who was a native of Zürich and had served in the Dutch army at Bergen op Zoom, settled in England and became a confectioner in Rochester, Kent.

== Career ==
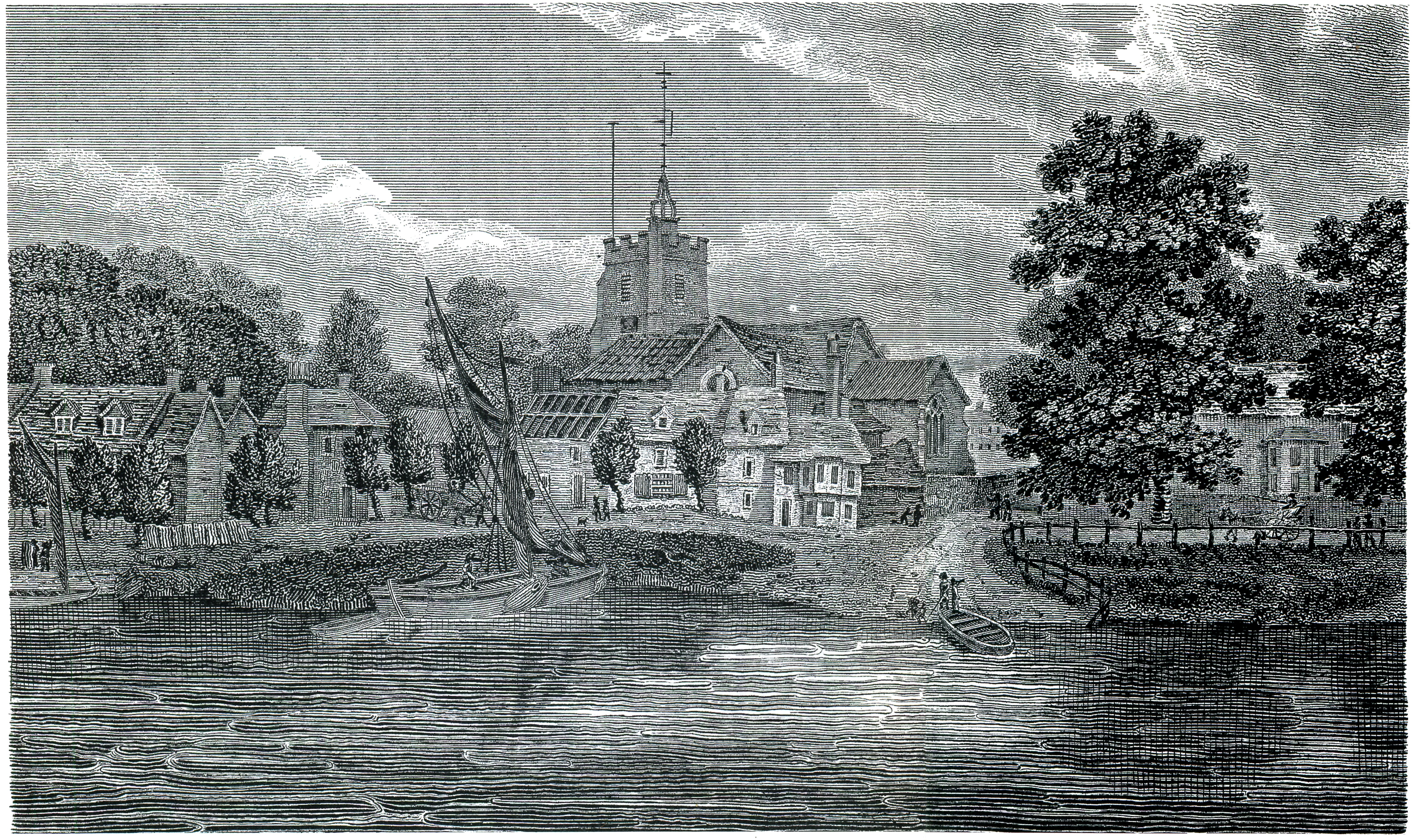
Engraving of St Nicholas Church, Chiswick by Robert Blemell after Jacob Schnebbelie, 1807

After continuing in his father's trade for a short time – first at Canterbury and then at Hammersmith – Schnebbelie abandoned it, and, though self-taught, became a drawing-master at Westminster School and other schools. Through the influence of Lord Leicester, the president, he became draughtsman to the Society of Antiquaries of London; he drew most of the excellent views of ancient buildings in the second and third volumes of Vetusta Monumenta. He made many drawings for Richard Gough's Sepulchral Monuments of Great Britain and John Nichols' History of Leicestershire.

In 1788 he published a set of four views of St Albans, drawn and etched by himself, and aquatinted by Jukes. In 1791 Schnebbelie began publishing the Antiquaries' Museum, illustrating the ancient architecture, painting, and sculpture of Great Britain, a series of plates etched and aquatinted by himself; but he lived to complete only three parts. The work was continued by his friends, Richard Gough and John Nichols, and issued as a volume, with a memoir of him, in 1800. He worked with James Moore and J. G. Parkyns on their Monastic Remains, 1791, his name appearing as the publisher on some of the plates. His 1787 etching of the Serpentine River, Hyde Park was aquatinted by Francis Jukes and published in 1796.

== Death and personal life ==
Schnebbelie died of rheumatic fever at his residence in Poland Street, London, on 21 February 1792. He left a widow and three children, for whom provision was made by the Society of Antiquaries. One of his sons, Robert Blemmell Schnebbelie (1781–1847), also practised as a topographical artist.
