= Jacob George Strutt =

British landscape painter and engraver

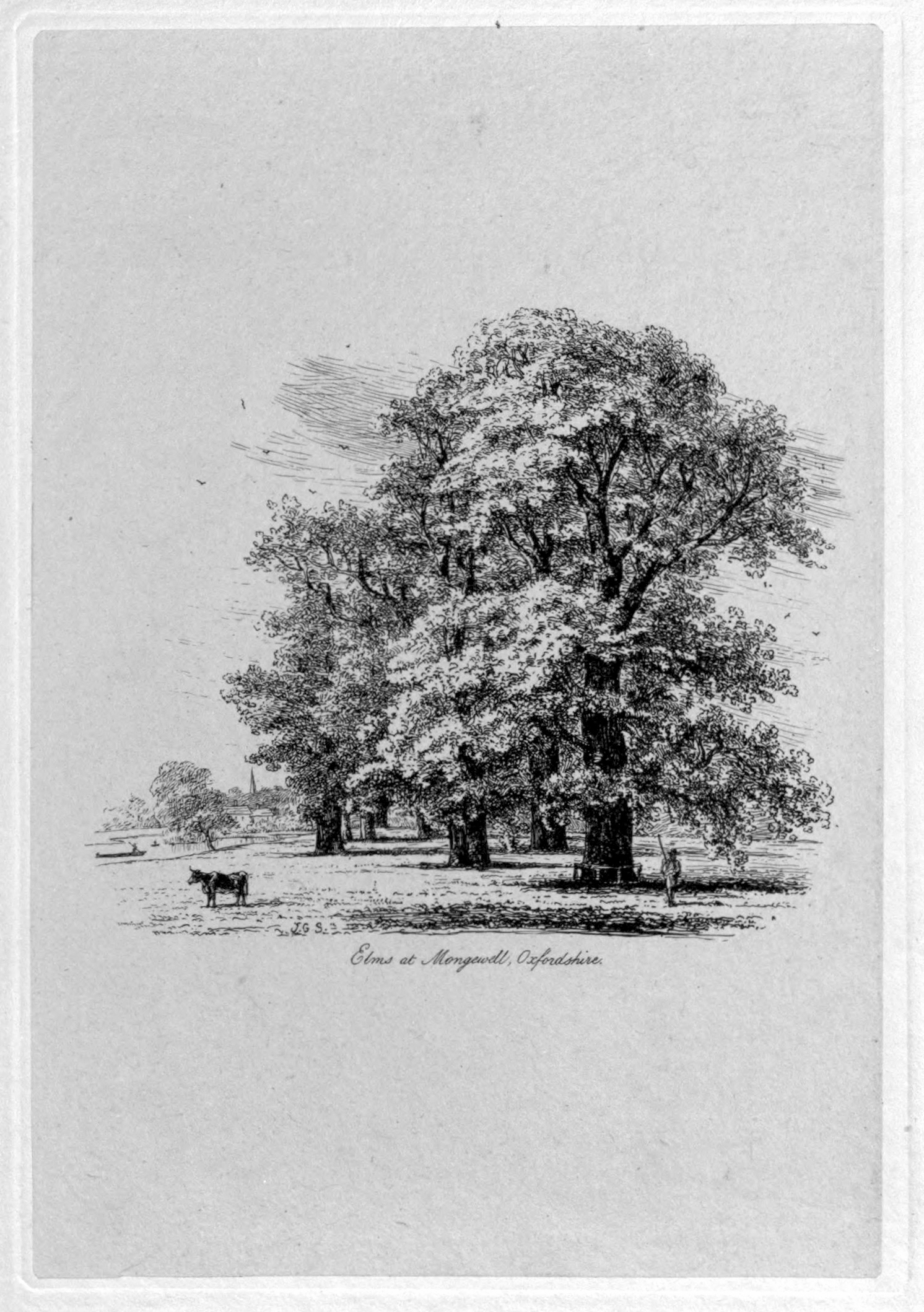
- Jacob George Strutt, Elms at Mongewell, Oxfordshire
- Born: 4 August 1784 (Note: Many older sources give his dates of birth and death as 1790 and 1864 respectively.); Colchester
- Died: 1867; Rome
- Known for: painter; engraver
- Spouse: Elizabeth Strutt
- Children: Arthur John Strutt

Jacob George Strutt (4 August 1784 – 1867) was a British portrait and landscape painter and engraver in the manner of John Constable. He was the husband of the writer Elizabeth Strutt, and father of the painter, traveller and archaeologist Arthur John Strutt.

== Life ==
Strutt was born on 4 August 1784 in Colchester, in Essex, one of eight children of Benjamin Strutt and Caroline, née Pollett. In London, on 8 November 1813, he married Elizabeth Byron, with whom he had four children; their second son, Arthur John Strutt, was born in 1819. Strutt moved to Lausanne in Switzerland in about 1830. With his son Arthur he travelled in France and Switzerland from 1835 to 1837, and later to Italy; they established a studio in Rome. He returned to England in 1851, and died in Rome in 1864 or 1867.

== Work ==
Strutt painted portraits and landscapes, mainly in gouache, in the style of Constable, with whom he may have studied. He was also a capable engraver. He showed work in London between 1819 and 1858. At the Royal Academy he exhibited from 1822 to 1852; in 1822 and 1823 he showed portraits, but from 1824 until 1831 showed only woodland or forest scenes. Two paintings were sent from Italy while he was living there: The Ancient Forum, Rome in 1845, and in 1851 Tasso's Oak, Rome. He published two books of poetry in translation, and several books of engravings.

== Publications ==
- Claudius Claudianus, Jacob George Strutt (1814). The Rape of Proserpine: with Other Poems, from Claudian; translated into English verse. With a prefatory discourse, and occasional notes. London: Printed by A. J. Valpy, sold by Longman, Hurst, Rees, Orme, and Brown.
- John Milton, The Latin and Italian Poems of Milton. Translated into English verse by J. G. Strutt. London: J. Conder, 1814.
- Bury St. Edmunds illustrated in Twelve Etchings by J.G. Strutt. London: J.G. Strutt, 1821.
- Sylva Britannica, or, Portraits of forest trees, distinguished for their antiquity, magnitude, or beauty. London: The author 1822; Full text of expanded 1830 edition.
- Deliciae sylvarum, or, Grand and romantic forest scenery in England and Scotland, drawn from nature, and etched by Jacob George Strutt. London: J. G. Strutt [1828].
