= Jacob Masen =

German Jesuit priest, historian, dramatist and theologian

Jacob Masen (28 March 1606 - 27 September 1681) was a German Jesuit priest, historian, dramatist and theologian. He is known as a prolific writer in Latin.

== Life ==
He was born at Dahlen in Jülich, and studied in Cologne. Having entered the Order of Jesus in 1629, he taught poetry and rhetoric in the Lower Rhine region. After theological studies he was ordained priest between 1639 and 1641. On the 3 May 1648 he took his final vows in Cologne. where he also acted as a preacher. He also acted in Paderborn and Trier. He died, aged 75, in Cologne.

== Works ==
He completed a substantial antiquarian work on Trier by Christoph Brouwer.

His epic poem Sarcotis (1654) became notorious in the 18th century, after William Lauder alleged that John Milton had plagiarised it in writing Paradise Lost.

With Jacob Bidermann, he was one of the most important Jesuit dramatists influencing German drama.
