= George Shepheard =

English watercolourist

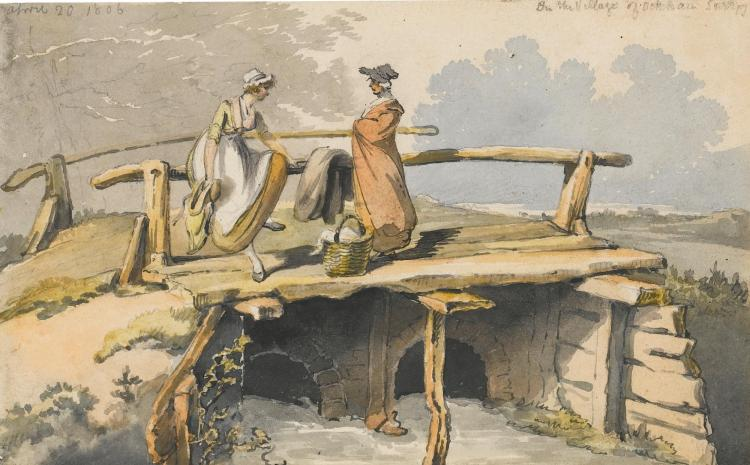
Watercolour of scene in Ockham, Surrey, 1806

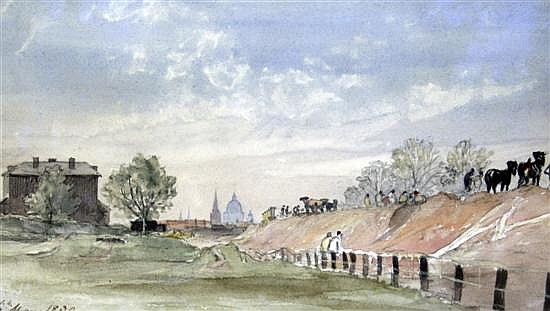
Labourers near London, watercolour, 1830

George Shepheard (26 January 1770 Guildford, Surrey – 7 September 1842 London) was an English painter in watercolours, caricaturist, and reproductive engraver. His watercolours are mostly landscapes in Surrey and Sussex, but he visited France in 1816, and probably Ireland in 1807 and Wales in 1825. He exhibited at the Royal Academy of Arts and elsewhere between 1811 and 1842. He is not to be confused with his rough contemporary George "Sidney" Shepherd (5 December 1784 – 1862), also a watercolourist, but largely of buildings and townscapes, especially in London (he also had artist children).

He founded a dynasty of painters, with the most notable his eldest son George Wallwyn Shepheard (1804 London – 1852 Brighton) who specialised in French and Italian views, and married Laura Justina Parigi (1820–1902) in Florence. The third son Lewis Henry Shepeard painted in Britain and Germany, exhibiting in London from 1844 to 1875. There were also three sisters and a middle brother, and from a second marriage another son and daughter; several of these painted, at least as amateurs.

He was also a professional cricketer who made one appearance for Surrey.

== External sources ==
- Artworks by or after George Shepheard at the Art UK site
- CricketArchive record
