= Charles Clarke (antiquary) =

English antiquary

Charles Clarke (died 1840) was an English antiquary.

== Life ==
Clarke was appointed a clerk in the ordnance office at Chatham in 1783. Seven years later, he was transferred to Gravesend, and in 1800 to Guernsey, where he remained until his retirement from the service in 1807. He died on 30 May 1840 in his eightieth year, and was buried in Old St. Pancras churchyard, London.

== Works ==
His early essays in the Gentleman's Magazine, under the signatures of "Indagator" and "Indagator Roffensis", obtained for him the friendship of Samuel Denne, the Kentish antiquary. In 1790, Denne communicated to the Society of Antiquaries, as an appendix to his own paper on "Stone Seats in the Chancels of Churches", some observations by Clarke on the same subject. Three years later, Clarke returned the compliment by addressing to Denne his "Observations on Episcopal Chairs and Stone Seats; as also on Piscinas and other appendages to Altars still remaining in Chancels; with a Description of Chalk Church, in the Diocese of Rochester", a paper, with four plates from drawings by the author, printed in Archæologia, xi. 317–74. Clarke was elected F.S.A. on 7th April, 1796.

Other papers of his appeared in John Britton's Architectural Antiquities (vols. i. and iv.). He also revised and prefaced a work left by his near relative, William Oram, entitled "Precepts and Observations on the Art of Colouring in Landscape Painting" (1810).

His other works are:

- Observations on the intended Tunnel beneath the river Thames, shewing the many defects in the present state of that projection (Gravesend, 1799). The project was that of Ralph Dodd, for a subway from Gravesend to Tilbury. Clarke had previously written on the subject in the Gentleman's Magazine.
- Some Account of the Rise and Progress of Early English Architecture, with descriptional Remarks on the Churches of the Metropolis, prefixed to Architectura Ecclesiastica Londini, a series of views by John Coney, George Sidney Shepherd, and other artists, of the churches of London, published 1819, and reissued with a new title-page the following year.
- Architectura Ecclesiastica Londini; Or Graphical Survey Of The Cathedral, Collegiate And Parochial Churches, In London, Southwark, And Westminster... (London: Published By John Booth, Duke Street, Portland Place, 1820)
