= Elizabeth Strutt =

English writer and traveller

- Born: Elizabeth Frost; 1782
- Died: 1867 (aged 84–85)
- Partner: Jacob George Strutt
- Children: Arthur John Strutt
- Writing career
- Pen name: Elizabeth Byron; Mrs. Byron; Mrs. Strutt

Elizabeth Strutt (1782–1867; fl. 1805–1863), also or previously known as Elizabeth Byron, was an English writer and traveller. She was the wife of Jacob George Strutt and mother of Arthur John Strutt, and an acquaintance and critic of Elizabeth Barrett Browning, whom she describes as having written "two of the most absurd and the most unpleasing sonnets in the English language". In the 1820s and 1830s she travelled in France and Switzerland, living for a time at Lausanne, and later with her husband and son moved to Rome.

== Life ==
The dates of birth and death of Elizabeth Strutt are uncertain. It is likely that she was the Elizabeth Frost christened at Hull, now in the East Riding of Yorkshire, on 20 February 1783. She was the sister of Charles Frost, Fellow of the Society of Antiquaries, of Hull, and daughter of Thomas Frost, solicitor, of Hull. She was awarded a Civil List pension on 18 June 1863, and so can not have died before that date. Lewis gives 1782 for her birth and 1867 for her death.

Her first three novels, Anti-Delphine (1806), Drelincourt and Rodalvi (1807) and The Borderers (1812) were published under the name "Mrs. Byron". At the time of publication of Genevieve, or the Orphan's Visit in 1818 she was "Mrs. Strutt". Until 1832 she and her husband Jacob George Strutt lived at Butterwick House in Hammersmith, where she "continued" the ladies' school of the Misses Attwood.

== Works ==
The published works of Elizabeth Strutt include:

=== As Mrs. Byron ===
- Anti-Delphine; a novel, founded on facts. London: J. Mawman, 1806
- Drelincourt and Rodalvi; or, Memoirs of two noble families. London: J. Mawman, 1807.
- The Borderers. An historical romance, illustrative of the manners of the fourteenth century. London: A.K. Newman & Co., 1812

=== As Elizabeth Strutt ===
- Genevieve, or the Orphan's Visit. A novel. London, 1818
- The Hermit of Dumpton Cave; or, Devotedness to God, and usefulness to man, exemplified in the old age of J. C. Petit, of Dumpton, near Ramsgate. London: Rivingtons, 1823
- Practical Wisdom; or, the Manual of life. The counsels of eminent men to their children. Comprising those of Sir Walter Raleigh, Lord Burleigh, Sir Henry Sidney, Earl of Stratford, Francis Osborn, Sir Matthew Hale, Earl of Bedford, William Penn, and Benjamin Franklin. With the lives of the authors. London: Henry Colburn & Co., 1824
- Triumphs of Genius and Perseverance; exemplified, etc. London, 1827
- A Spinster's Tour in France, the States of Genoa, &c. during the year 1827. London: Longmans & Co., 1828
- The Young Christian's Companion; or, Manual of Devotion for the use of schools and young persons ... Selected from the Liturgy of the Church of England and the Holy Scriptures. London: J. Souter, 1830
- Six Weeks on the Loire. With a peep into La Vendée. London: Simpkin and Marshall, 1833
- Chances and Changes; a domestic story. By the Author of "Six weeks on the Loire". London: Saunders & Otley, 1835 Volume 1
- The Book of the Fathers; containing the lives of celebrated Fathers of the Christian Church, and the spirit of their writings. London: J. W. Parker, 1837
- Domestic Residence in Switzerland. London: T.C. Newby, 1842 Volume 1, Volume 2
- A Wreath for the Altar of the New Church. (in verse) Bury St. Edmund's: privately printed, [1842]
- The Story Of Psyche With A Classical Enquiry Into The Signification And Origin Of The Fable By Elizabeth Strutt With Designs In Outline By John Gibson Esq: R.A. [London: s.n., 1852]
- The feminine soul: its nature and attributes. With thoughts upon marriage, and friendly hints upon feminine duties. London: J.S. Hodson, 1857
- The Curate and the Rector; a domestic story. London: Routledge, Warne & Routledge, 1859.
