= The Gentleman's Magazine =

London periodical (1731–1922)

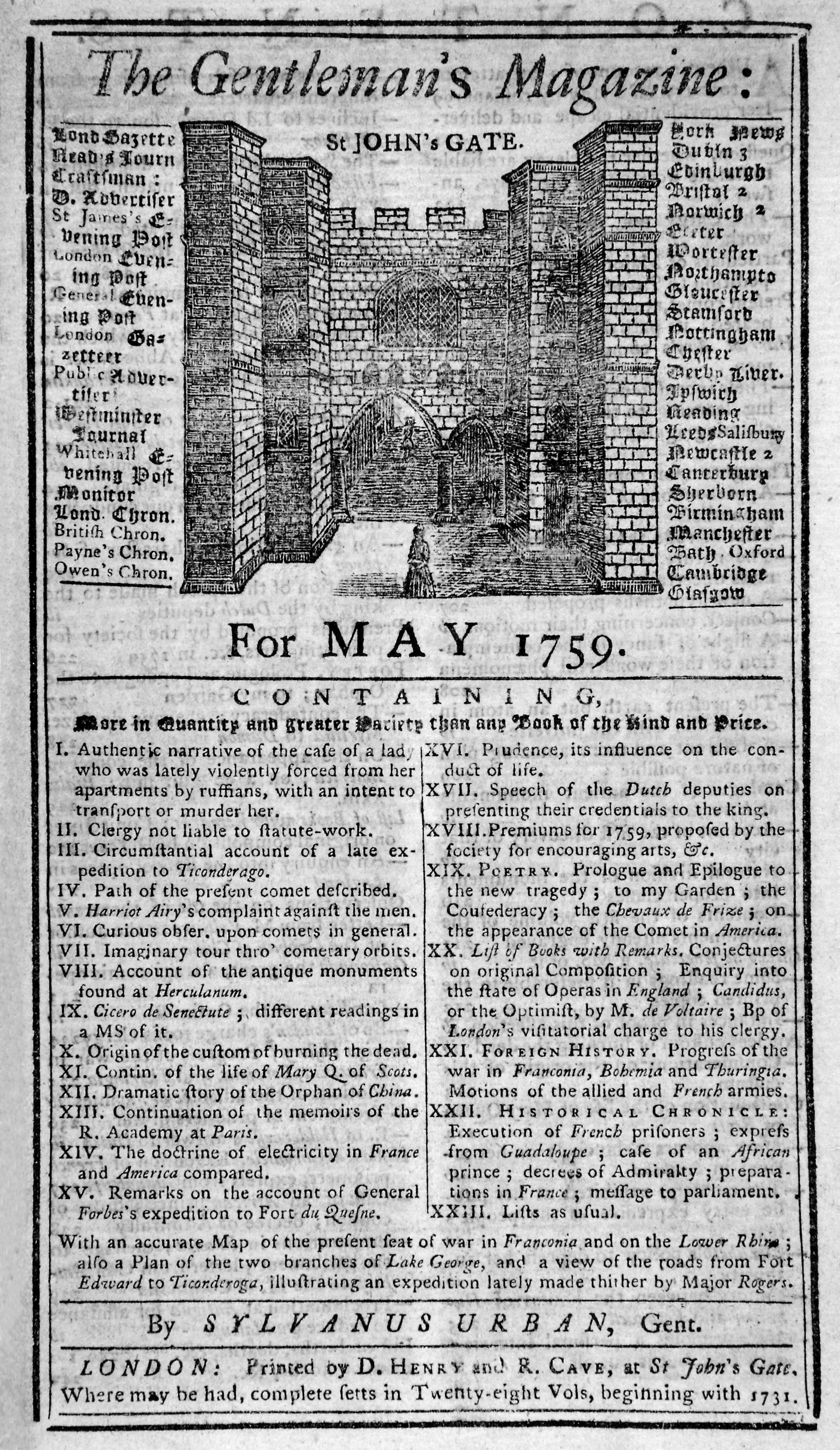
Front page of The Gentleman's Magazine, May 1759

The Gentleman's Magazine was a monthly magazine founded in London, England, by Edward Cave in January 1731. It ran uninterrupted for almost 200 years, until 1907, ceasing publication altogether in 1922. It was the first to use the term magazine (from the French magazine, meaning "storehouse") for a periodical. Samuel Johnson's first regular employment as a writer was with The Gentleman's Magazine.

== History ==
The original complete title was The Gentleman's Magazine: or, Trader's monthly intelligencer. Cave's innovation was to create a monthly digest of news and commentary on any topic the educated public might be interested in, from commodity prices to Latin poetry. It carried original content from a stable of regular contributors, as well as extensive quotations and extracts from other periodicals and books. Cave, who edited The Gentleman's Magazine under the pen name "Sylvanus Urban", was the first to use the term magazine (meaning "storehouse") for a periodical. Contributions to the magazine frequently took the form of letters, addressed to "Mr. Urban". The iconic illustration of St John's Gate, Clerkenwell, on the front of each issue (occasionally updated over the years) depicted Cave's home, in effect, the magazine's "office".

Before the founding of The Gentleman's Magazine, there were specialised journals, but no such wide-ranging publications (although there had been attempts, such as The Gentleman's Journal, which was edited by Peter Motteux and ran from 1692 to 1694).

Samuel Johnson's first regular employment as a writer was with The Gentleman's Magazine. During a time when parliamentary reporting was banned, Johnson regularly contributed parliamentary reports as "Debates of the Senate of Magna Lilliputia". Though they reflected the positions of the participants, the words of the debates were mostly Johnson's own. The name "Columbia", a poetic name for America coined by Johnson, first appears in a 1738 weekly publication of the debates of the British Parliament in the magazine.

The magazine's long-running motto, E pluribus unum, Latin for "Out of many, one", is thought to have inspired the use of the phrase as an unofficial motto of the United States. Motteux's The Gentleman's Journal had previously used the phrase.

A skilled businessman, Edward Cave developed an extensive distribution system for The Gentleman's Magazine. It was read throughout the English-speaking world and continued to flourish through the 18th century and much of the 19th century under a series of different editors and publishers. It went into decline towards the end of the 19th century and finally ceased general publication in September 1907. However, issues consisting of four pages each were printed in very small editions between late 1907 and 1922 in order to keep the title formally "in print".

== Series ==
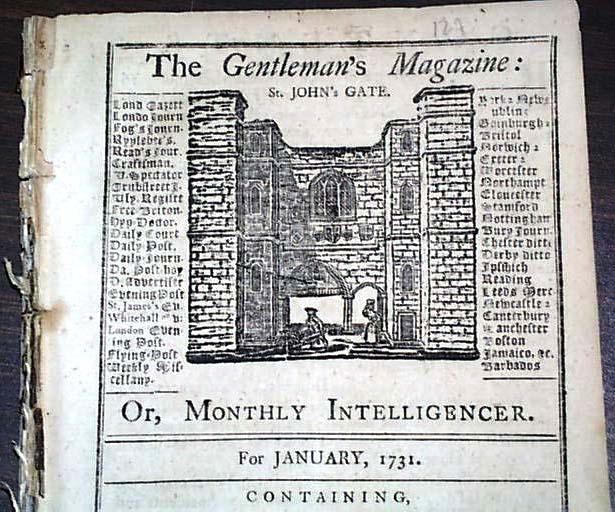
Top half of Volume One, Issue One, published January 1731

- 1731–1735: The Gentleman's Magazine or Monthly Intelligencer
- 1736–1833: The Gentleman's Magazine and Historical Chronicle
- 1834–1856 (June) New Series: The Gentleman's Magazine
- 1856 (July)–1868 (May) New Series: The Gentleman's Magazine and Historical Review
- 1868 (June)–1922 Entirely New Series: The Gentleman's Magazine

== Indexes ==
In addition to an index for each year of The Gentleman's Magazine, which was usually published with the December issue of the magazine, a full index was compiled by the College of Arms and typed by the Genealogical Society of Utah. This 75-volume index, covering the years 1731–1850, gives the full name and an abbreviated reference to the date, event, and any other person(s) in each entry. The index is available at the Family History Library (FHL) under the call number 942 B2g Index, and is also available on microfilm (#599738–#599761) or microfiche (#6026701). In addition to the index, the FHL also has the magazine itself available in various formats.

An abstract of the "chief contents of The Gentleman's Magazine from 1731 to 1868" was published by George L. Gomme in 1891. He describes it as "excerpts from the original publications containing local history and information, topographical details, and family history are presented here, organized into volumes by county". Gomme's work has been digitised and indexed by Ancestry.com and is available online to Ancestry subscribers or at subscribing libraries.

A four-volume set of indexes was compiled by Samuel Ayscough (Assistant Librarian of the British Museum) with some assistance or later editing by John Nichols and by Gabriel Richard. The contents of these indexes are given as:

- Volume 1 – 1731–1786 (published by Samuel Ayscough)
  - Index to the essays, dissertations and historical passages (494 pp.)
  - Index to poetry (62 pp.)
  - Index to names (239 pp.)
  - Index to plates (10 pp.)
  - Index to books (118 pp.)
- Volume 2 – 1787–1818 (published by John Nichols)
  - Index to the essays, dissertations and historical passages (486 pp.)
  - Index to poetry (57 pp.)
  - Index to names (519 pp.)
  - Index to plates (17 pp.)
  - Index to books (103 pp.)
  - Index to books announced (13 pp.)
  - Index to musical publications (3 pp.)
- Volume 3 – 1731–1818 (published by John Nichols)
  - Index to plates (239 pp.)
- Volume 4 – 1731–1780 (published by the British Record Society)
  - Index to names and surnames (687 pp.)

Volume 2 includes an "Index of Names to the Marriages, Births, Deaths, Promotions, &c." covering 1731–1786, and volume 4 contains an "Index of Names of Persons" covering 1731–1818. The indexes are by surname only and are available online for free through Google Books:

- Ayscough, Samuel; Nichols, John. "General Index to the Gentleman's Magazine" Nichols, 1789. Vol. 2. Free digital version at Google Books (follow link to page 64, which is followed by the index, which is numbered as page 1). Indexes names from Vol. 1 "To the End of the LVIth Volume of the Gentleman's Magazine" and covers 1731–1786.
- Ayscough, Samuel; Nichols, John. (sometimes Richard, Gabriel) "General Index to the Gentleman's Magazine 1787–1818" Nichols, 1821. Vol. 3. Free digital version at Google Books

David Dobson gleaned references to American births, marriages, and deaths from The Gentleman's Magazine and published it as American Vital Records from the Gentleman's Magazine, 1731–1868 (Baltimore, MD: Genealogical Publishing Co., 1987).

A few partial indexes to genealogical events in The Gentleman's Magazine are also available:

- Fry, Edward Alexander. "Index to the Marriages in the Gentleman's Magazine, 1731–1768" (London:[s.n.], 1922)
- Fry, Edward Alexander. "Index to the Biographical and Obituary Notices in Gentleman's Magazine, 1731–1780" (London: British Records Society, 1891)
- Marriages from The Gentleman's Magazine for the years 1731 to 1768 were included in Boyd's Marriage Index.
- Obituaries were included in Musgrave's Obituaries.
- Joseph Foster's index to marriages includes marriages from this periodical, as well as from The Times (1865–1880 only) and the Historical Register; but covers surname beginning Aa–Alexander only.
- Bodleian Library's Internet Library of Early Journals offers an online subject search tool for the years 1731–1750.

== Authors of works published ==
- Mark Akenside (1721–1770), physician and poet
- Henry Aldrich (1647–1710), English theologian and philosopher
- Richard Allestree or Allestry (1619–1681), Royalist churchman and provost of Eton College from 1665
- Anthony Alsop (d. 1726), Church of England clergyman and poetical writer
- George Ashby (1724–1808), English learned antiquary and sometime president of St. John's College, Cambridge
- Francis Atterbury (1663–1732), English man of letters, politician, Bishop of Rochester, and Dean of Westminster Abbey
- Samuel Badcock (1747–1788), English nonconformist minister, theological writer and literary critic
- Henry Baker (1698–1774)
- John Bancks (1709–1751), miscellaneous writer
- Mary Barber (c. 1685–c. 1755), poet, mother of nine children, and a member of Swift's circle
- James Theodore Bent (1852-1897), celebrity explorer
- Samuel Bowden (fl. 1733–1761), English physician and poet (alive in 1761 but deceased by 1778)
- John Bowle (1725–1788), Church of England clergyman known as a writer on Spanish literature
- Samuel Boyse (1708–1749), Irish poet
- Peregrine Branwhite (1745–1795?), English poet
- Anna Eliza Bray (1790–1883), British novelist
- James Norris Brewer (fl. 1799–1829), English topographer and novelist
- James Shudi Broadwood (1772–1851), piano maker in Middlesex and a magistrate in Surrey
- Rev. Moses Browne (1704–1787), Church of England priest and poet
- Edward John Carlos (1798–1851), English antiquarian and writer on architecture
- Thomas Christie (1761–1796), radical political writer
- Charles Clarke (antiquary) (died 1840), antiquarian
- Rev. John Darwall (1731–1789), Church of England clergyman and hymnodist
- William Hepworth Dixon (1821–1879), English traveller, historian, author
- Rev. John Duncombe (1729–1786)
- Rev. William Dunkin, D.D. (1709?–1765), Irish poet and Anglican clergyman
- William Falconer (1732–1769), Scottish poet
- Thomas Faulkner (1777–1855), topographer of Chelsea, Fulham, Kensington etc.
- Bertram Fletcher Robinson (1870-1907), sportsman, editor, journalist and author.
- James Frederic Ferguson (1807–1855), Irish antiquary born in Charleston, South Carolina
- Thomas Fisher (1772–1826)
- Rev. George Glasse (1761–1809), chaplain and a Fellow of the Royal Society
- Sir Andrew Halliday (1782–1839), Scottish physician, reformer, and writer
- Sir John Hawkins (1719–1789), English author and friend of Samuel Johnson and Horace Walpole
- Rev. William Hawkins (1722–1801), English clergyman, poet, and dramatist
- Susanna Highmore (1690–1750), minor British poet
- Samuel Johnson (1709–1784)
- Andrew Kippis (1725–1795), English nonconformist clergyman and biographer
- Rev. John Langhorne (1735–1779), Church of England clergyman, poet and co-translator of Plutarch's Lives
- William Lauder (c. 1680–1771), Scottish literary forger; article on John Milton's Paradise Lost was largely a plagiarism of earlier works
- Sir Sidney Lee (1859–1926)
- John Lockman (1698–1771), English author
- Michael Lort (1725–1790), Welsh clergyman, academic, and antiquary
- William Markham (1719–1807), English divine and archbishop of York
- Arthur Murphy (1727–1805), Irish writer
- Laetitia Pilkington (c. 1709 to 1750), Dublin-born author and friend of Jonathan Swift
- Robert Riccaltoun (1691–1769), Scottish Presbyterian divine and friend of poet James Thomson (1700–1748)
- William Roscoe (1753–1831), English historian and miscellaneous writer; poetry by him first appeared in the magazine in 1807
- Richard Savage (c. 1697–1743), English poet
- George Stephens (1813–1895), English archaeologist and philologist who worked in Scandinavia
- Jonathan Swift (1667–1745), Anglo-Irish satirist, essayist, political pamphleteer (first for the Whigs, then for the Tories), poet and cleric who became Dean of St. Patrick's Cathedral, Dublin
- Captain Philip Thicknesse (1719–1792)
- James Thomson (1700–1748), Scottish poet and playwright best known for his masterpiece The Seasons and the lyrics of "Rule, Britannia!"
- Nigel Tourneur (18??–18??), pseudonym of a fin de siècle writer known for one work only—Hidden Witchery, a collection of seven short stories and a short prose drama
- Thomas Tyrwhitt (1730–1786), English classical scholar and critic
- Michael Tyson (antiquary) (1740–1780), Church of England clergyman, academic, antiquary and artist
- Richard Weston (botanist) (1733–1806)
- Charles Woodmason (c. 1720–1789), English-born American poet
- Edward Young (1681–1765), English poet, best remembered for Night-Thoughts

== Associated artists, painters, topographers ==
- James Norris Brewer (fl. 1799–1829) English topographer and novelist
- Thomas Faulkner (1775–1855), topographer
- John Gibson (1750–1792), cartographer
- Moses Griffith (1749–1819), Welsh draughtsman, engraver, and water colourist
- William George Moss, chief illustrator c. 1819
- Bartholomew Howlett (1767–1827), English draughtsman and engraver
- Samuel Rawle (1771–1860), English topographical engraver and draughtsman

== See also ==
- History of journalism

== See also ==
- The Gentlewoman
