= John Whichelo =

British painter (1784–1865)

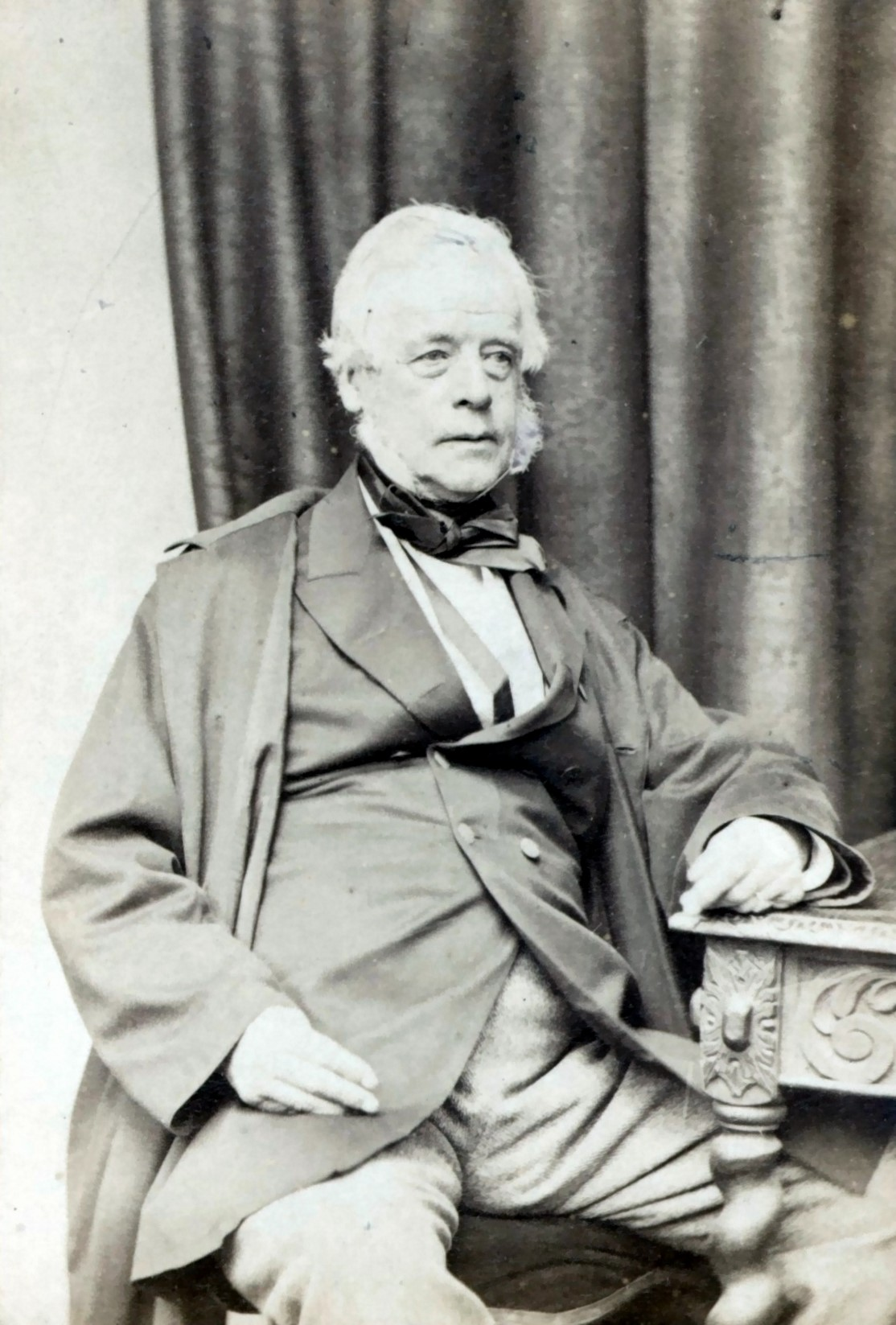
C. John M. Whichelo

Charles John Mayle Whichelo (1784–1865), who usually signed as John Whichelo, was a British marine, landscape and topographical painter. He was made the Prince Regent's Marine and Landscape Painter.

His works were engraved for Londina Illustrata, The Beauties of England and Wales and David Hughson's Walks Through London.

His brother was Henry Mayle Whichelo. Henry's grand-child and John's great niece was Mary Eleanor [Nellie] Whichelo (1862–1959) who was the head designer of the Royal School of Art Needlework.
