= William Oram =

English painter

William Oram (c.1711 – 17 March 1777) was an English painter and architect.

== Life ==
Oram was educated as an architect, and, through the patronage of Sir Edward Walpole, obtained the position of master-carpenter to the Board of Works. He designed a triumphal arch for the coronation of George III of Great Britain, of which an engraving was published. Oram also devoted much time to landscape-painting in the style of Gaspar Poussin.

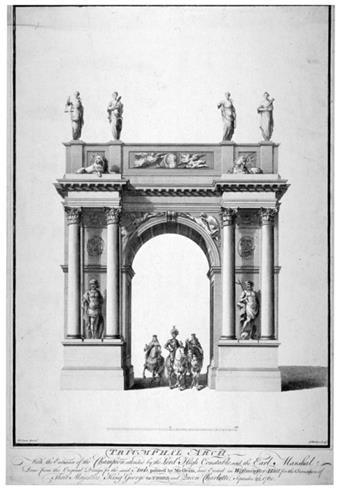
Triumphal arch for Westminster Hall, 1761, designed by William Oram for George III

Oram was generally known as "Old Oram", to distinguish him from his son. He died on 17 March 1777, leaving a widow and a son, Edward Oram (fl. 1770–1800), also a landscape-painter.

== Works ==
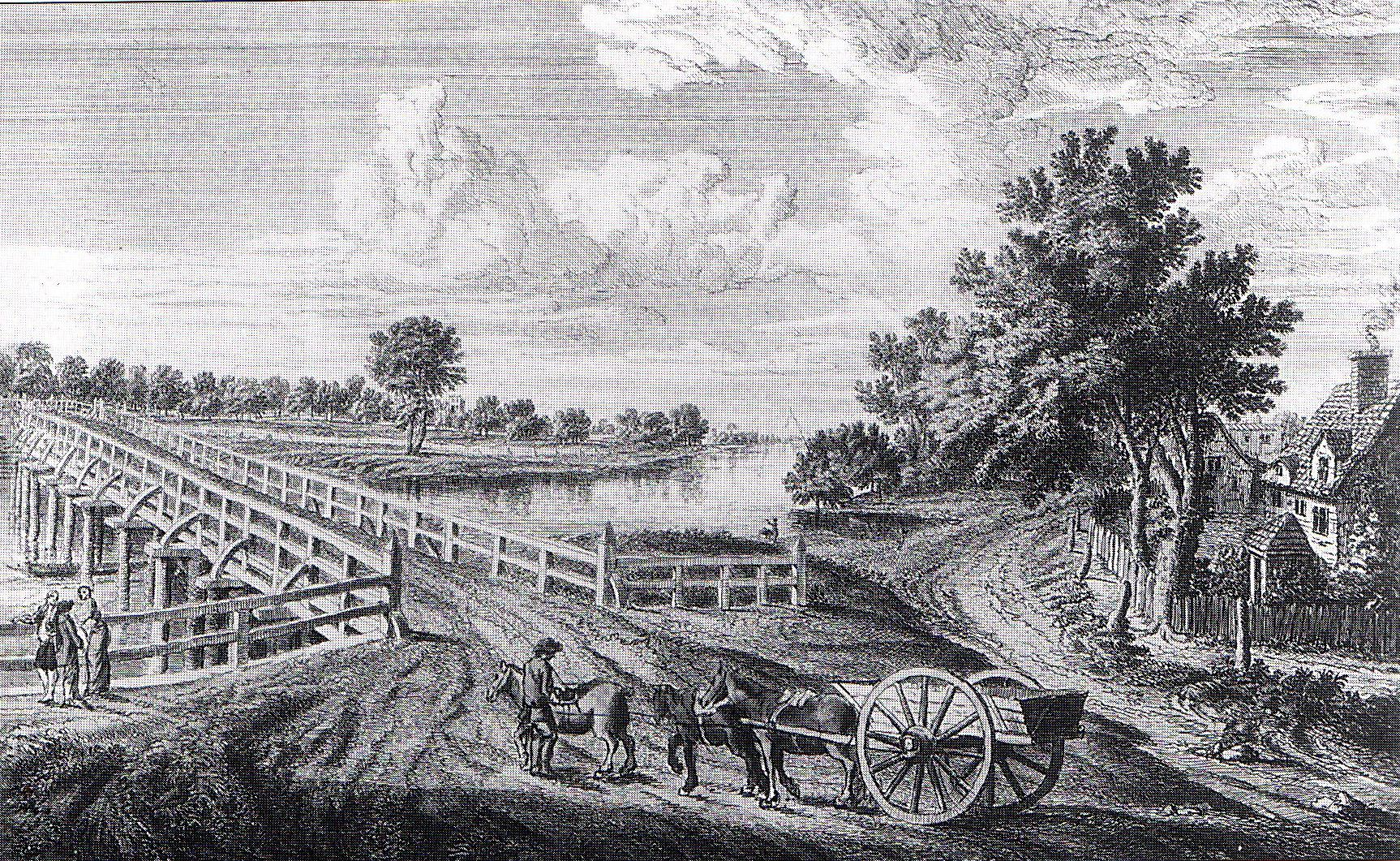
Datchet Bridge, 1750, by William Oram

Thomas James Mulvany's opinion was that Oram painted in the style of John Wootton, and had probably been his pupil. He also produced watercolour drawings, in the manner of Richard Wilson.

Oram's works were often applied to decorative purposes and inserted over doors and mantelpieces. He designed and painted the staircase at Buckingham House, and was employed to repair the paintings on the staircase at Hampton Court. He published an etching of Datchet Bridge in 1745. In 1766 he exhibited three landscapes at the Society of Artists' exhibition.

== Legacy ==
In his will, dated 4 January 1776, and proved 17 March 1777, Oram described himself as of St. John's, Hampstead, and left everything to his wife Elizabeth. She then gave his manuscripts to his close relative the antiquarian Charles Clarke, who in 1810 published from them Precepts and Observations on the Art of Colouring in Landscape-Painting, by the late William Oram, esq., of his Majesty's Board of Works.

== Notes ==
Attribution

This article incorporates text from a publication now in the public domain: Lee, Sidney, ed. (1895). "Oram, William". Dictionary of National Biography. Vol. 42. London: Smith, Elder & Co.
