= William Lauder (forger) =

Scottish literary forger

William Lauder (c. 1680–1771) was a Scottish literary forger, the second son of Dr William Lauder (1652–1724), one of the original 21 Fellows of the Royal College of Physicians of Edinburgh, by his spouse Catherine Brown (died 1698). Dr William Lauder was a son of Sir John Lauder, 1st Baronet of Fountainhall.

While yet a boy, Lauder suffered amputation of one of his legs, in consequence of having accidentally received a stroke from a golf ball on his knee. He was educated at the University of Edinburgh, acquired a high college character for talent and scholarship, and graduated in 1695. He applied unsuccessfully for the permanent post of Professor of Humanity there, in succession to Adam Watt, in whose place, since 1734, owing to Watt's illness, he had been teaching. "William Lauder, Teacher of Humanities at Edinburgh University" appears in a Disposition in the National Archives of Scotland, (GD267/27/138/1746) to Ninian Home of Billie, dated 25 August 1740.

Lauder had also applied at some point for the keepership of the university library. In 1739 he had published a collection of sacred poems by himself and other writers, mostly paraphrased from the Bible. These were published by Ruddiman in 2 volumes, under the title of Poetarum Scotorum Musae Sacrae, today a well-known work of Scottish literature.

In 1739 Lauder narrowly failed in his application to become one of the masters of the High School in Edinburgh, but in 1742 Lauder was appointed one of the doctors, or junior masters, at Dundee Grammar School, where he remained until the Jacobite rising of 1745, whereupon he went to London. In 1747 he wrote an article for the Gentleman's Magazine suggesting that John Milton's Paradise Lost was largely a plagiarism from the Adamus Exul (1601) of Hugo Grotius, the Sarcotis (1654) of Jacob Masen (Masenius, 1606–1681), and the Poemata Sacra (1633) of Andrew Ramsay (1574–1659). Lauder expounded his case in a series of articles, and in a book (1753) increased the list of plundered authors to nearly a hundred.

His success was short-lived. Several scholars, who had independently studied the alleged sources of Milton's inspiration, showed that Lauder had not only garbled most of his quotations, but had inserted amongst them extracts from a Latin version of Paradise Lost. This led to his exposure by Bishop John Douglas, and he was obliged to write a complete confession at the dictation of his former friend, Samuel Johnson. After several vain endeavours to clear his character he emigrated to Barbados, where he purchased a hotel and also taught in a school. He remained there until his death.
