= Nellie Whichelo =

British textile designer (1862–1959)

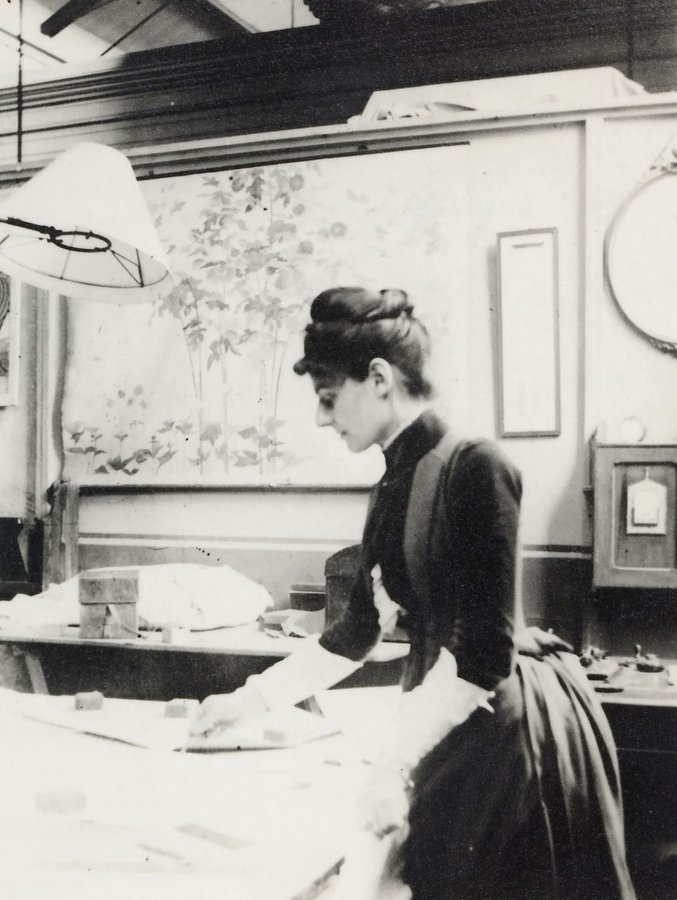
- Born: Mary Eleanor Whichelo; 6 July 1862; Stockwell, London
- Died: 12 July 1959 (aged 97); Battersea, London
- Employer: Royal School of Needlework
- Known for: arts and crafts embroidery designs
- Relatives: John Whichelo (great-uncle)

Nellie Whichelo born Mary Eleanor Whichelo (6 July 1862 – 12 July 1959) was the British head designer of the Royal School of Art Needlework that was renamed the Royal School of Needlework. She retired after more than sixty years in 1939.

== Life ==
Whichelo was born in Stockwell, London. Her parents were Louise (born Graham) and Henry Mayle Whichelo. Her father was an artist who taught people to draw and his father (with the same name) had also been an artist.

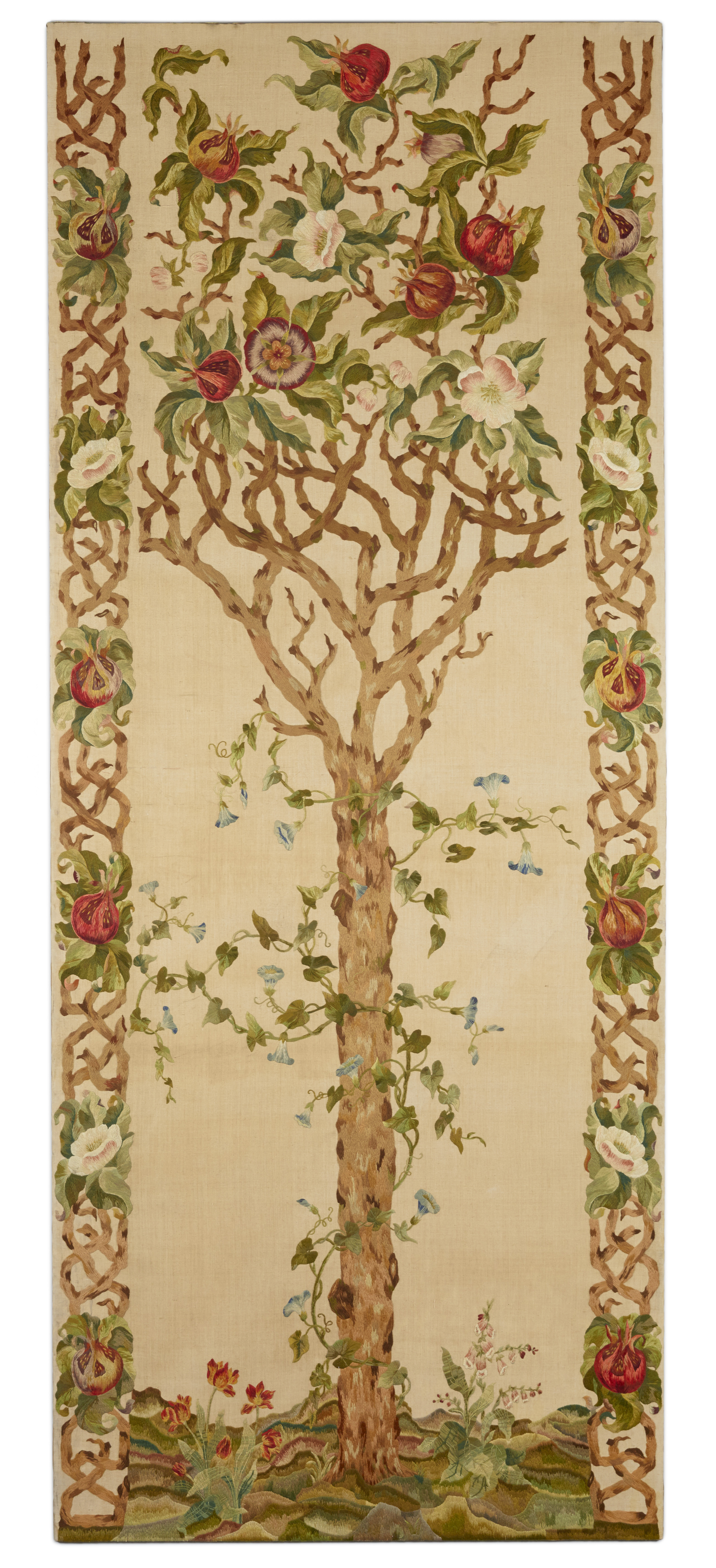
Embroidery-The-Pomegranate designed by Nellie Whichelo

She joined the Royal School of Art Needlework with her sister Georgiana in 1879 when Louisa Anne Wade was the leading figure.

She exhibited in the Arts & Crafts Exhibition Society's 2nd exhibition at The New Gallery in Regent Street in 1889 and in their third exhibition the following year.

In 1900 the Royal School exhibited work at the Exposition Universelle where Sir Edwin Lutyens had designed a mock Tudor British Royal Pavilion. Whichelo's designs for the furnishings included hangings that were over 12 by 13 feet. The textiles had taken 56 ladies, 8 weeks to embroider and they won a gold medal.

She led the Royal School when new monarchs were being crowned. She and the school helped with the work required for the coronations of Edward VII, George V, and George VI.

In 1922 the Royal School of Art Needlework was renamed to be the Royal School of Needlework.

She retired in 1939 after 62 years at the Royal School. It is said that her resignation was in protest at the blackout restrictions imposed as a result of war breaking out with Germany.

Whichelo died in hospital in 1959 in London's Battersea.
