= William Herbert (antiquarian) =

- Died: Haggerston
- Occupations: Librarian and antiquary

William Herbert (1771–1851) was an English librarian and antiquary.

== Life ==
In 1828 he was elected librarian of the Guildhall Library, which had been recently re-established by the Corporation of London. He prepared a second edition of the catalogue in 1840, and retired in 1845. He died, aged 80, on 18 November 1851, at 40 Brunswick Street, Haggerston; he was survived by Eliza Herbert, probably his daughter.

== Works ==
With Edward Wedlake Brayley he produced in 1803 a volume of tales and poems, entitled Syr Reginalde, or the Black Tower; a romance of the Twelfth Century (London), and in 1806 a history of Lambeth Palace, which he dates from Globe Place, Lambeth. Another edition of the latter work was published for the illustrators in the same year. He was also associated with Robert Wilkinson in producing Londina Illustrata, an illustrated account of ancient buildings in London and Westminster in two volumes (1819–25). According to the plates of this work he lived at Marsh Gate, Lambeth, in 1808–9.

Herbert is best known for his History of the Twelve great Livery Companies of London, (1836–7, 2 vols). All his works are lavishly illustrated. He also published:

- Antiquities of the Inns of Court and Chancery … with a concise history of the English law, 1804.
- Select views of London and its environs … from original paintings and drawings, accompanied by copious letterpress descriptions, 1804–5, 2 vols.
- London before the Great Fire parts 1–2, 1817.
- Illustrations of the site and Neighbourhood of the new Post Office … with an account of the antient Mourning Bush tavern, &c., Aldersgate, and various London taverns 1830.
- The history and antiquities of the parish and church of St. Michael, Crooked Lane, London; with historical sketches of the Boar's Head tavern, Eastcheap 1831. This work was published by subscription, and was intended to be in six parts, of which only two appeared.
- School elocution, or the young academical orator 1853; published posthumously.

His collections, mainly in manuscript, for the history of London livery companies, chantries and monasteries, were preserved in the Guildhall Library.
