= George Shepherd (artist) =

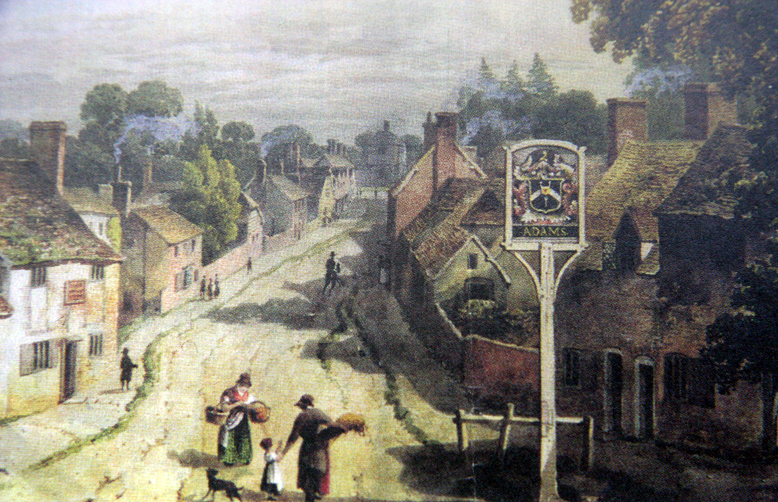
- Shepherd's watercolour of Aldermaston (1819)
- Born: 5 December 1784; London
- Died: 1862
- Education: Dr. Cox Macro's sketching academy
- Known for: Draughtsman, watercolour painter
- Awards: Silver palette – Society of Arts; 1803; Silver palette – Society of Arts; 1804

George "Sidney" Shepherd (5 December 1784 – 1862) was a British draughtsman and watercolourist. At one time, George Shepherd and George Sidney Shepherd were thought to be two different people; it is now believed that they are one and the same person. He is also not to be confused with his contemporary (and possibly distant cousin) George Shepheard.

== Biography ==
Shepherd was a topographical, architectural and landscape painter. Until 1793 he lived in France (where his younger brother was born), returning to Britain on the outbreak of the Great French War. Shepherd was awarded a silver palette by the Society of Arts in 1803 and again in the following year.

He was a contributor to John Britton's The Architectural Antiquities of Great Britain, vol IV, in the early 19th century. See, for example, Tynemouth Priory, Ruins of East End. He first married in 1812, Anna Sarah Lonnon of Bedfordshire. He Illustrated, with others, Architectura Ecclesiastica Londini (1819) by Charles Clarke. See, for example, St. George's Bloomsbury 1811. He worked on and off throughout his career with publisher, Rudolph Ackermann, who published a series of street views, Ackermann's repository of Arts, containing illustrations from both George, and his brother, Thomas Hosmer Shepherd. Compare, for example, The London Commercial Sale Rooms, Mark Lane, 1813, by George Shepherd with St. Stephen's Church Walbrook, 1814, by T. H. Shepherd. George Shepherd painted a watercolour of Aldermaston in 1819.

In 1831, Shepherd was one of the founder members of the resurrected New Society of Painters in Watercolours (now the Royal Institute of Painters in Water Colours). The society had been first formed in 1807, as a result of the Royal Academy (of Arts), at that time, refusing to accept watercolours as an important contribution to art. The society attracted leading watercolour artists of that period, including David Cox, Peter De Wint, William Blake, Samuel Prout, Paul Sandby and Joseph Powell. It closed in 1812 due to financial problems. In 1850 there was a movement to expel Shepherd from the resurrected society for non-payment of dues, but on further investigation he was deemed to be impoverished and was instead made an Honorary Member. 10 years later, he became bedridden and was granted a pension.
