= Christoph Brouwer =

Dutch historian (1559–1617)

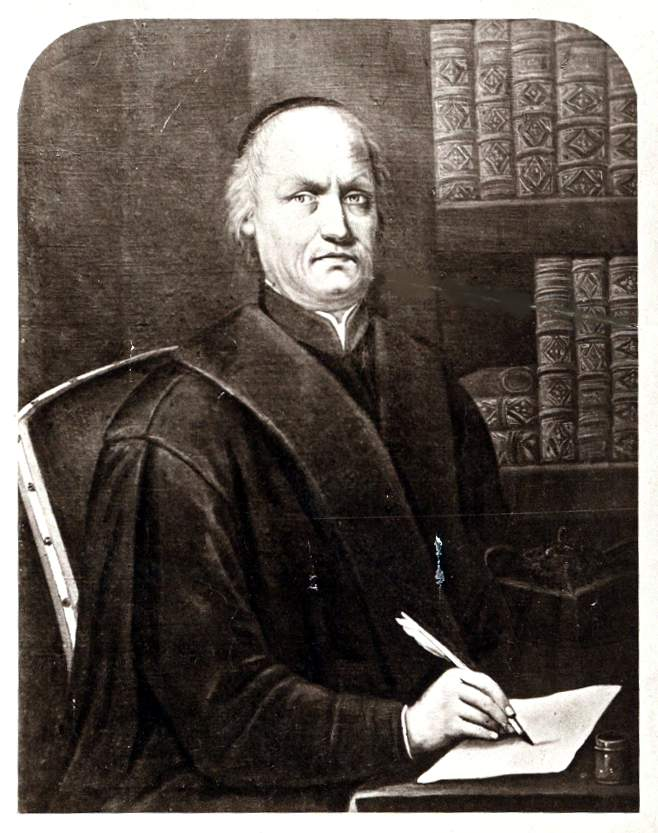
Christoph Brouwer

Christoph Brouwer (or Browerius) (12 March 1559 – 1617) was a Jesuit priest of the Netherlands, and ecclesiastical historian. He is particularly known for his contribution to the history of the Archdiocese of Trier.

== Early life and education ==
Brouwer was born in Arnhem, the Netherlands. In 1580 he entered the Society of Jesus, and after a thorough humanistic training, devoted himself especially to the study of church history. His attainments in other branches of learning are shown by his appointment as professor of philosophy at Trier; later he was appointed rector, first at Fulda, and then at Trier.

== Career ==
His chief work was entitled: Antiquitates et annales Trevirenses et episcoporum Treverensis ecclesiae suffragorum. The work extends to the year 1600 and was prepared at the request of two archbishops, Johann VII of Schoenenberg and Lothar of Mitternich, with the intent to disprove the partisan publication of Hermann (Kyriander), Syndic of Trier. Hermann's work was published in 1576 and was written to support the claims of the city against the rights of the archbishop.

Brouwer devoted the greater part of his life to the preparation of his book and, according to the testimony of the historian Johann Nikolaus von Hontheim, he is deserving of undying honor for his contribution to the history of the Archbishopric of Trier. Unfortunately, he did not live to complete his task. Brouwer's unflinching love of truth and his true historical method were not agreeable to the councilors of the archbishop; so, although the publication of his work had been sanctioned by the authorities of his order, it could not be issued. It was not until 1626 that the work of printing his manuscript at Cologne could be undertaken, and then only after important alterations had been made in the text. New difficulties arose when the eighteenth book was in press. The completion of the printing was forbidden and all the sheets already struck off were suppressed as much as possible, so that only a few copies have come down to us. Brouwer's labors were continued from 1600 to 1652 by Jacob Masenius, who issued the whole work in revised form in 1670 in two folio volumes at Liège.

Brouwer was unable to complete his other great work, which was entitled Metropolis Ecclesiae Trevericae. It was intended to contain a description of all the cities, churches, and monasteries in the Archdiocese of Trier. This work did not appear until 1855-56, when it was issued at Koblenz in two volumes by Christian vom Stramberg. The edition does not meet fully the demands of our time; nevertheless it contains much that is useful. Brouwer's history of the Diocese of Fulda is also worthy of mention. It is entitled: Fuldensium antiquitatum libri 4 (Antwerp, 1612). Of less importance is the work issued at Mainz in 1616, entitled Sidera illustrium et sanctorum virorum, qui Germaniam ornarunt. Among the results of his humanistic studies is the edition of the works of Bishop Venantius Fortunatus, which was issued at Mainz in 1603, together with a life of Saint Martin of Tours. A second edition appeared in 1617 augmented by the annotated poems of Archbishop Rabanus Maurus.

== Death ==
He died in Trier, Germany.
