= Elizabeth Wilford =

English businesswoman (died 1559)

- Born: Elizabeth Gale
- Died: 1559
- Occupation: Businesswoman
- Spouse: Nicholas Wilford (m. 1529; died 1551)

Elizabeth Wilford (died 1559) was an English businesswoman, who was one of only two female founding members of the Muscovy Company.

== Early life and marriage ==
Elizabeth Gale was probably born in the parish of St George Botolph Lane, and was the only surviving child of Thomas Gale of London (died 1540), a member of the Haberdasher's Company, and Elizabeth Wilkinson (died 1546). She was raised in the Catholic faith. On 1 September 1529, she married Nicholas Wilford (c. 1495 – August 1551), a freeman of the Merchant Taylors' Company and a substantial cloth exporter. Together they had eleven children, seven daughters and four sons. Her husband also later represented London in the 1542 parliament and became the auditor of the City of London between 1545 and 1547. He also served as the governor of St Bartholomew's Hospital.

At the beginning of their marriage, they lived in the parish of St Bartholomew-the-Less before moving into her parents' capital tenements and shops in Botolph Lane.

== Widowhood ==
In 1551, an epidemic of sweating sickness swept across London. Her husband contracted the disease and he died shortly afterwards. She inherited all his freehold lands and more than £1000, and became active in his businesses, most notably as an importer of cloth. Wilford also actively traded with Russia. Wilford also She was one of two women of the 201 founding members of the Muscovy Company in 1555, and the only woman to invest in the Muscovy Company independently of a husband.

Wilford died in spring 1559, and was buried in St George Botolph Lane beside her husband.
