= Disappearance of Father Francis =

Father Francis
- Disappeared: Mullaitivu District, Sri Lanka
- Status: Missing for 17 years, 3 months and 8 days
- Occupation: Priest
- Employer: Roman Catholic Church

Francis Joseph, also known as Father Francis, is a Catholic Tamil priest. He disappeared along with hundreds of Sri Lankan Tamils when they surrendered to the Sri Lankan army on 18 May 2009. They crossed the Vattuvagal bridge from LTTE-held areas and crossed into Sri Lanka government-held area, boarded army buses, and were never seen again.

== Background ==
Father Francis was a student of St. Patrick's College, Jaffna. After being ordained as a Priest, he returned to the college to teach English and later became the Principal. He was firm supporter of an independent Tamil Eelam but he never used violence.

Yasmin Sooka, a member of the United Nations' Darusman Report states that

"This particular event is the single largest number of people who have been subject to enforced disappearances at the hands of the Sri Lankan army"

Father Francis wrote an open letter on 10 May 2009 to the Vatican stating that the Sri Lankan government is waging a genocidal war against the Tamils. He was aware that his life would be in danger, as the letter would anger the Sri Lankan government.
