= Father Francis of Aberdeen =

Scottish priest

Father Francis of Aberdeen (died 1559) was said to be a Catholic Trinitarian friar of Aberdeen and known as the "Protomartyr of Scotland". "It appears that no one presently believes in this martyrdom"., citing. "Few, however, will be able to make the leap of faith required of Power’s ‘evidence’ that Friar Francis was the first [martyr of the Reformation]."
