= Robert Wilkinson (cartographer) =

English cartographer and engraver (1768–1825)

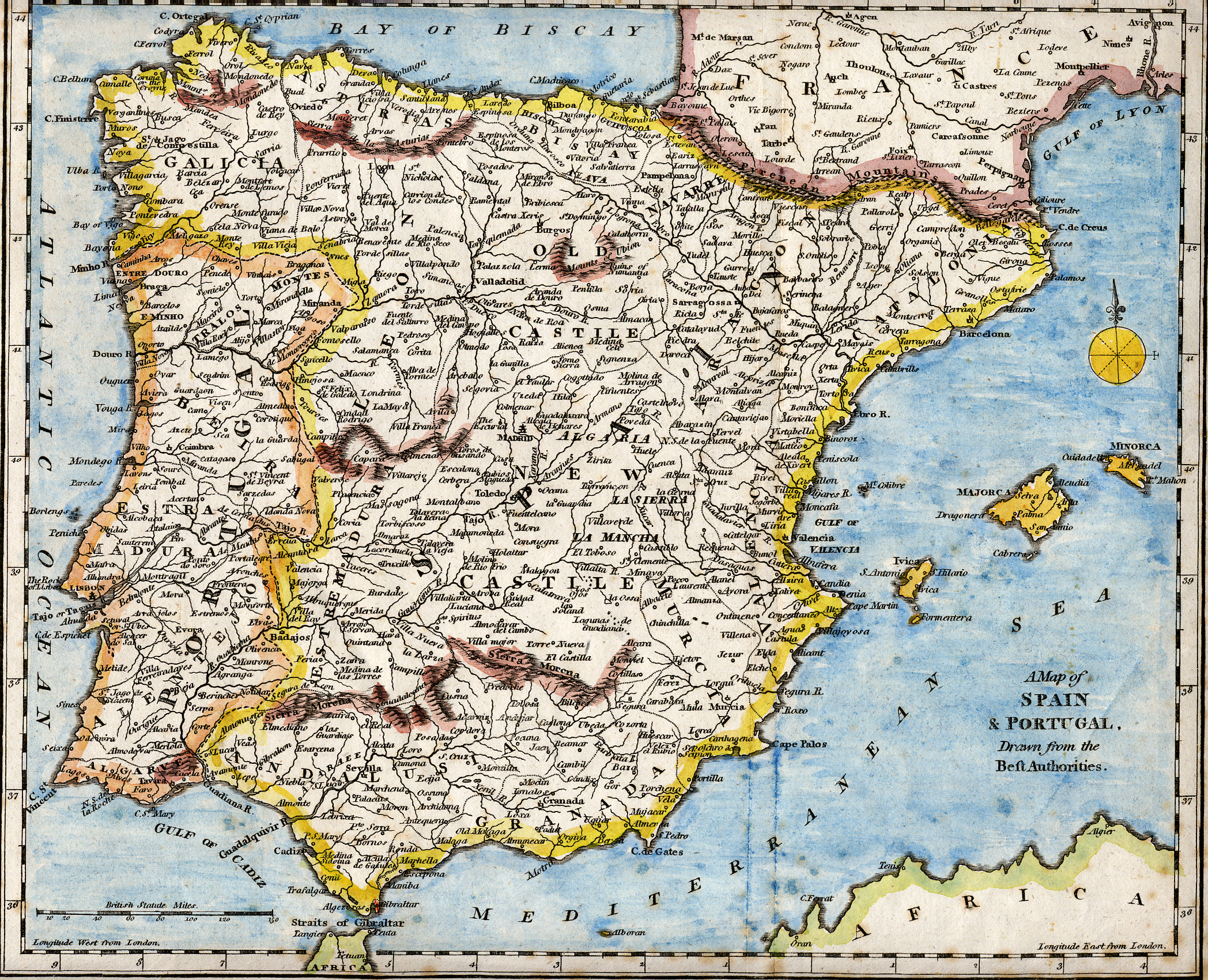
Iberian Peninsula

Robert Wilkinson (c. 1768 – 1825) was an English cartographer of maps and atlases, engraver, and book publisher.

== Career ==
Most of Wilkinson's maps were derived from English map publisher John Bowles. Following Bowles' death in 1779, Wilkinson acquired the Bowles map plate library, after which he updated the plates until 1794, when he released The General Atlas of the World. This atlas was reissued several times, in 1802 and 1809, before Wilkinson's death in 1825.

Wilkinson's other works include Bowen and Kitchin's Large English Atlas (1785), Speer's West Indies (1796), Atlas Classica (1797), and independently issued maps of New Holland (1820) and North America (1823). He also published, initially together with William Herbert, groups of plates depicting historic scenes and buildings in London and the area surrounding it, under the title Scarce Topographical Prints No. II. ... of Londina Illustrata in 1808. These were issued serially until 1819, when they were published in a first volume, and in a second volume in 1825 under the title Londina Illustrata.

Wilkinson's offices were located at No.58, Cornhill, London, from 1792 to 1816, after which he relocated to 125 Fenchurch Street, also in London, until 1825.

After his death, Wilkinson's business and map plates were acquired by William Darton Jr, who reissued the General Atlas.
