= Louisa Wade =

Louisa Ann Wade
- Born: July, 1843; Finsbury
- Died: 29 July 1920; Roehampton
- Known for: Head of the Royal School of Needlework
- Predecessor: Victoria Welby
- Successor: Evelyn Bradshaw

Louisa Ann Wade (July 1843 – 29 July 1920) was the head of the Royal School of Needlework for forty years.

== Early life ==
Wade was born in Finsbury. She was one of the fourteen children of the Tractarian Reverend Nugent Wade and Louisa (born Fenwick). Her father led St Anne's Church in Soho. Sculptor George Edward Wade was one of her brothers.

== Career ==
Her brother Fairfax Blomfield Wade was a designer at the School of Art Needlework, and in 1873 she too was employed together with her younger sisters Octavia and Edith Wade. She already had experience of needlework as she learned the skill on church embroidery and she had used it to make and sell pieces for charity. The school had been founded by Victoria, Lady Welby employing twenty ladies above a shop in Sloane Street. It existed to keep the skill of hand embroidery going and to provide employment for impoverished ladies. The three sisters were not impoverished.

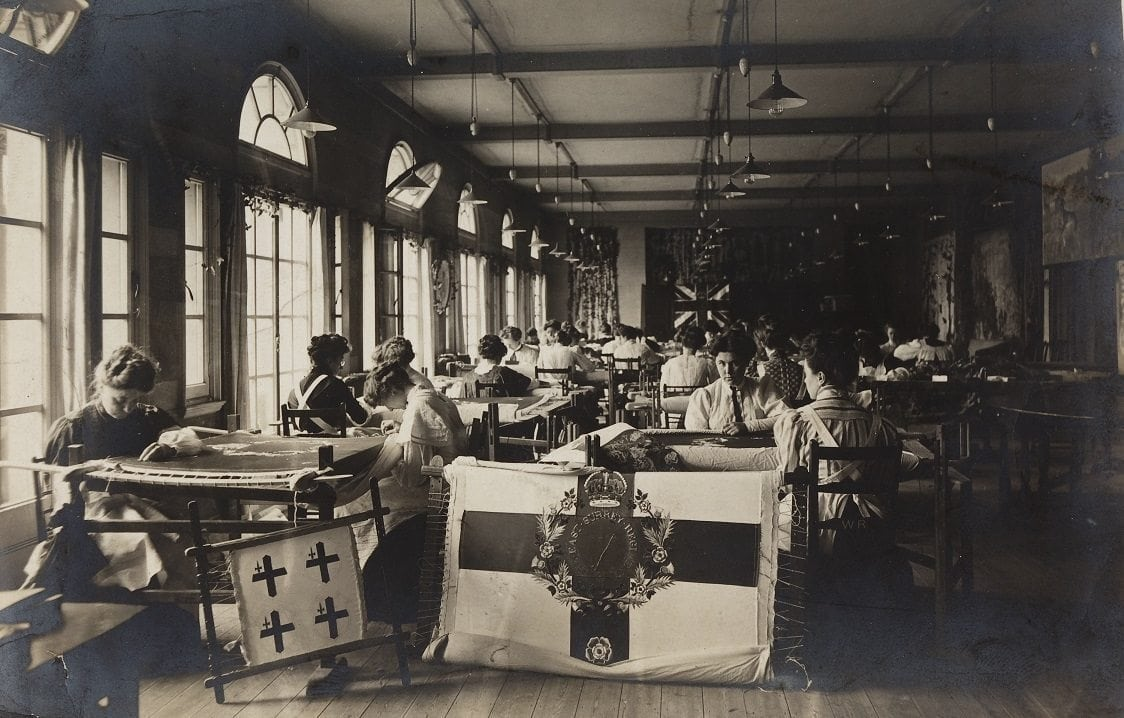
Royal School of (Art) Needlework workroom on Exhibition Road c.1903

She became the head of the Royal School of Needlework after Welby named her as a temporary replacement and then decided to retire later the same year in 1874. Welby decided that the current management was amateur, and she proposed that John Aldam Heaton should replace her. Heaton knew about textiles and he had been involved since the school was founded. However the school's president and vice-president, Princess Christian of Schleswig-Holstein and Lady Marian Alford supported Wade and she was appointed. In 1875 the school became the Royal School of Art Needlework. She reorganised the school in 1877. "Lily" Higgin became her assistant secretary and worked with Marian Alford to create the school's first technical guidebook.

Wade and the school were involved with major royal events including the funeral of Queen Victoria. In 1902, Victoria's son, Edward VII, was crowned. His sister Princess Christian of Schleswig-Holstein was still President of the school and she persuaded her brother, the new King, to commission a mantle that was, not as expected from figured brocade, but to have one made of plain gold cloth. The work was given to the Royal School, and the head designer, Nellie Whichelo, was given the task. The design had to include the symbols of England, Scotland, Wales and Ireland. The school was able to create raised needlework and Wade was credited with its adoption. She had the task of managing the school but she still spent some time doing embroidery. She resigned around 1915 after 40 years and was replaced by her assistant, Evelyn Bradshaw. Wade died in Roehampton in 1920.
