= Ruland =

Ruland and Rüland are surnames. Notable people with these names include:

- Angkana Rüland (born 1987), German mathematician
- Arthur J. Ruland (1886–1973), American lawyer and politician
- Carl Ruland (1834–1907), German art and literary historian
- Dan Ruland (born 1960), American basketball player
- Fritz Ruland (1914–1999), German cyclist
- Heiner Ruland (1934–2017), German composer and music therapist
- Jeff Ruland (born 1958), American basketball player
- Martin Ruland the Elder (1532–1602), German physician and alchemist
- Martin Ruland the Younger (1569–1611), German physician and alchemist
- Stefan Ruland (born 1980), German politician
