= Pall Mall, London =

Street in Central London

Pall Mall

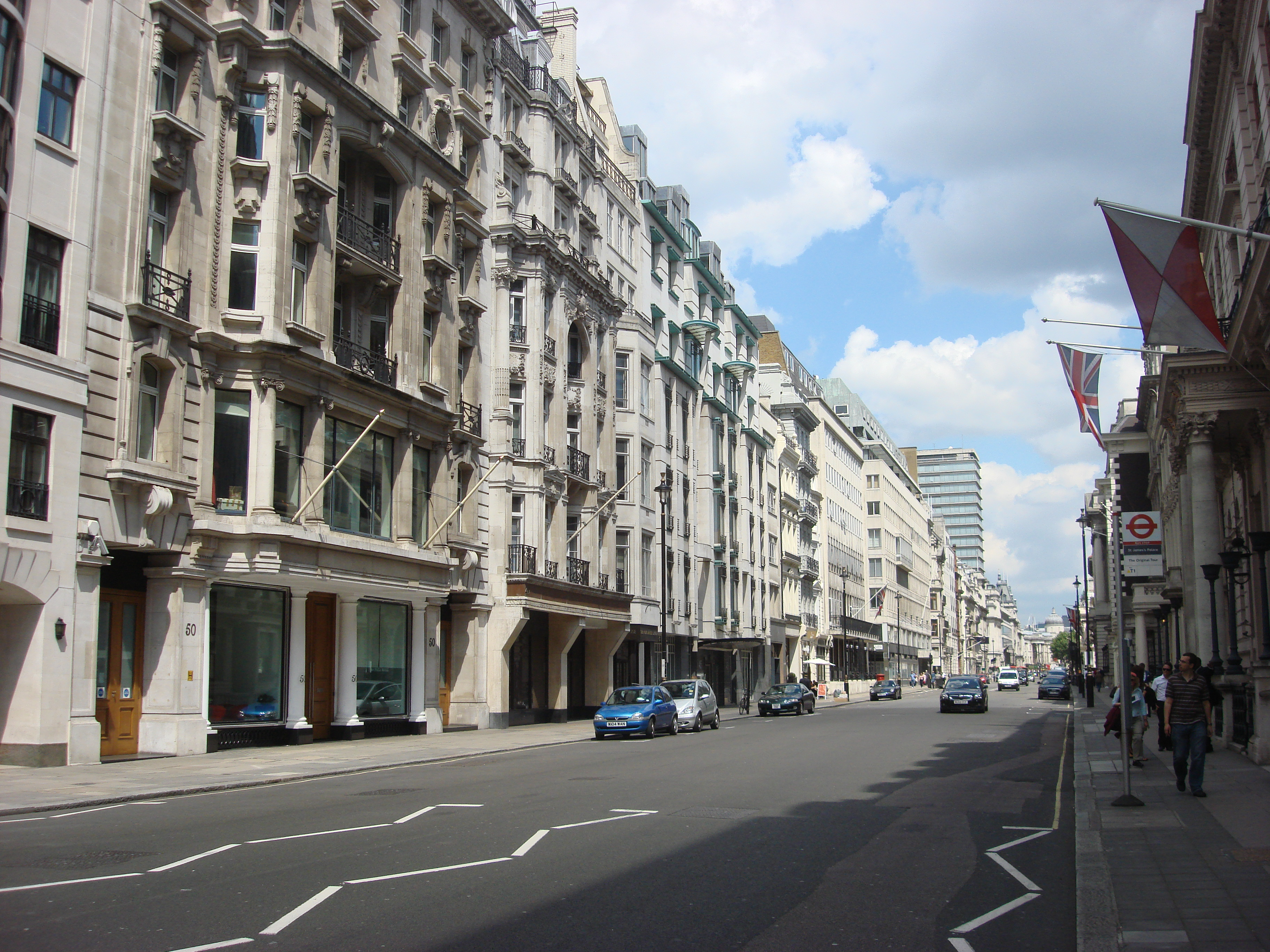
- Pall Mall in 2009

- Location within City of Westminster
- Length: 0.4 mi (0.64 km)
- Location: Westminster, London, United Kingdom
- Postal code: SW1
- Nearest train station: Charing Cross; Charing Cross
- Coordinates: 51.506944°N 0.133056°W
- East end: Haymarket
- West end: St James's Street

Construction
- Commissioned: July 1661
- Inauguration: September 1661

Other
- Known for: Reform Club; Athenaeum Club; Travellers Club; Royal Automobile Club

Pall Mall /ˌpæl ˈmæl/ is a street in the St James's area of the City of Westminster, Central London. It connects St James's Street to Trafalgar Square and is a section of the regional A4 road. The street's name is derived from pall-mall, a ball game played there during the 17th century, which in turn is derived from the Italian pallamaglio, literally "ball-mallet".

The area was built up during the reign of Charles II with fashionable London residences. It has been known for high-class shopping from the 18th century until the present. It has been known for gentlemen's clubs since the 19th century; the Reform, Athenaeum and Travellers clubs have survived to the 21st century. The War Office was based on Pall Mall during the second half of the 19th century, and the Royal Automobile Club's headquarters have been on the street since 1908.

== Geography ==
The street is around 0.4 miles (0.6 km) long and runs east in the St James's area, from St James's Street across Waterloo Place, to the Haymarket and continues as Pall Mall East towards Trafalgar Square. The street numbers run consecutively from north-side east to west and then continue on the south-side west to east. It is nominally part of the A4, a major road running west from Central London, but is not used as a through road.

== History and topography ==
=== Early history and pall-mall field ===
Pall Mall was constructed in 1661, replacing an earlier highway slightly to the south that ran from the Haymarket (approximately where Warwick House Street is now) to the royal residence, St James's Palace. Historical research suggests a road had been in this location since Saxon times, although the earliest documentary references are from the 12th century in connection with a leper colony at St James's Hospital. When St. James's Park was laid out by order of Henry VIII in the 16th century, the park's boundary wall was built along the south side of the road. (Note: In 1685, the boundary wall became the parish boundary for the parish of Westminster St James.) In 1620, the Privy Council ordered the High Sheriff of Middlesex to clear a number of temporary buildings next to the wall that were of poor quality.

Pall-mall, a ball game similar to croquet, was introduced to England in the early 17th century by James I. The game, already popular in France and Scotland, was enjoyed by James' sons Henry and Charles. In 1630, St James's Field, London's first pall-mall court, was laid out to the north of the Haymarket – St James road.

After the Restoration and King Charles II's return to London on 29 May 1660, another pall-mall court was constructed in St James's Park just south of the wall, on the site of The Mall. Samuel Pepys's diary entry for 2 April 1661 records: "[I] went into St. James's Park, where I saw the Duke of York playing at Pelemele, the first time that I ever saw the sport". This new court suffered from dust blown over the wall from coaches travelling along the highway. In July 1661 posts and rails were erected, stopping up the old road. The court for pall-mall was very long and narrow, and often known as an alley, so the old court, namely St James's Field, provided a suitable route for relocating the eastern approach to St James's Palace. A grant was made to Dan O'Neale, Groom of the Bedchamber, and John Denham, Surveyor of the King's Works, allocating a 1,400-by-23-foot (427 by 7 m) area of land for this purpose. The grant was endorsed 'Our warrant for the building of the new street to St James's'.

A new road was built on the site of the old pall-mall court, and opened in September 1661. It was named Catherine Street, after Catherine of Braganza, wife of Charles II, but was better known as Pall Mall Street or the Old Pall Mall. (Note: By 19 August 1662, Pepys's diary reports a duel "at the old Pall Mall at St. James's", in which Thomas Jermyn (nephew of the Earl of St Albans) was wounded and Colonel Giles Rawlins was killed.) The pall-mall field was a popular place for recreation, and Pepys records several other visits. By July 1665 Pepys used "Pell Mell" to refer to the street as well as the game. (Note: On 4 July 1665, Pepys wrote: "I observed a house shut up this day in the Pell Mell, where heretofore in Cromwell's time we young men used to keep our weekly clubs.")

=== 17th- and 18th-century buildings ===
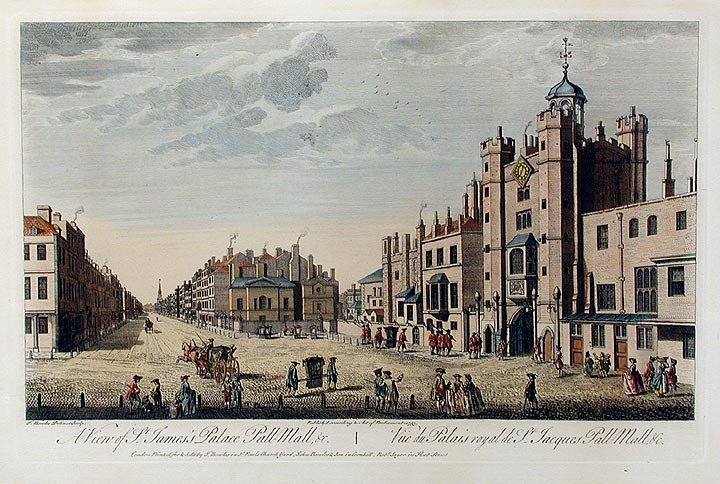
A View of St James's Palace, Pall Mall etc by Thomas Bowles, published 1763. This view looks east. The gatehouse of St James's Palace is on the right.

In 1662, Pall Mall was one of several streets "thought fitt immediately to be repaired, new paved or otherwise amended" under the London and Westminster Streets Act 1662 (14 Cha. 2. c. 2). The paving commissioners appointed to oversee the work included the Earl of St Albans. The terms of the act allowed commissioners to remove any building encroaching on the highway, with compensation for those at least 30 years old. The commissioners determined that the real tennis court and adjoining house at the northeast corner of Pall Mall and St James's Street should be demolished, and in 1664 notified Martha Barker, the owner of the Crown lease, to do so. Although Barker initially rejected £230 compensation, the court was demolished by 1679.

The street was developed extensively during 1662–1667. The Earl of St Albans had a lease from the Crown in 1662 on 45 acres (18 ha) of land previously part of St James's Fields. He laid out the site for the development of St James's Square, Jermyn Street, Charles Street, St Albans Street, King Street and other streets now known as St James's. The location was convenient for the royal palaces of Whitehall and St James and the houses on the east, north and west sides of the square were developed along with those on the north side of Pall Mall, each constructed separately as was usual for the time. Houses were not built along the square's south side at first, or the adjoining part of Pall Mall. The Earl petitioned the King in late 1663 that the class of occupants they hoped to attract to the new district would not take houses without the prospect of eventually acquiring them outright. Despite opposition from the Lord Treasurer, the Earl of Southampton, on 1 April 1665 the King granted the Earl of St Albans the freehold of the St James's Square site, along with all the ground on the north side of Pall Mall between St James's Street and the east side of St James's Square. The freehold of the north side of Pall Mall subsequently passed to other private owners.

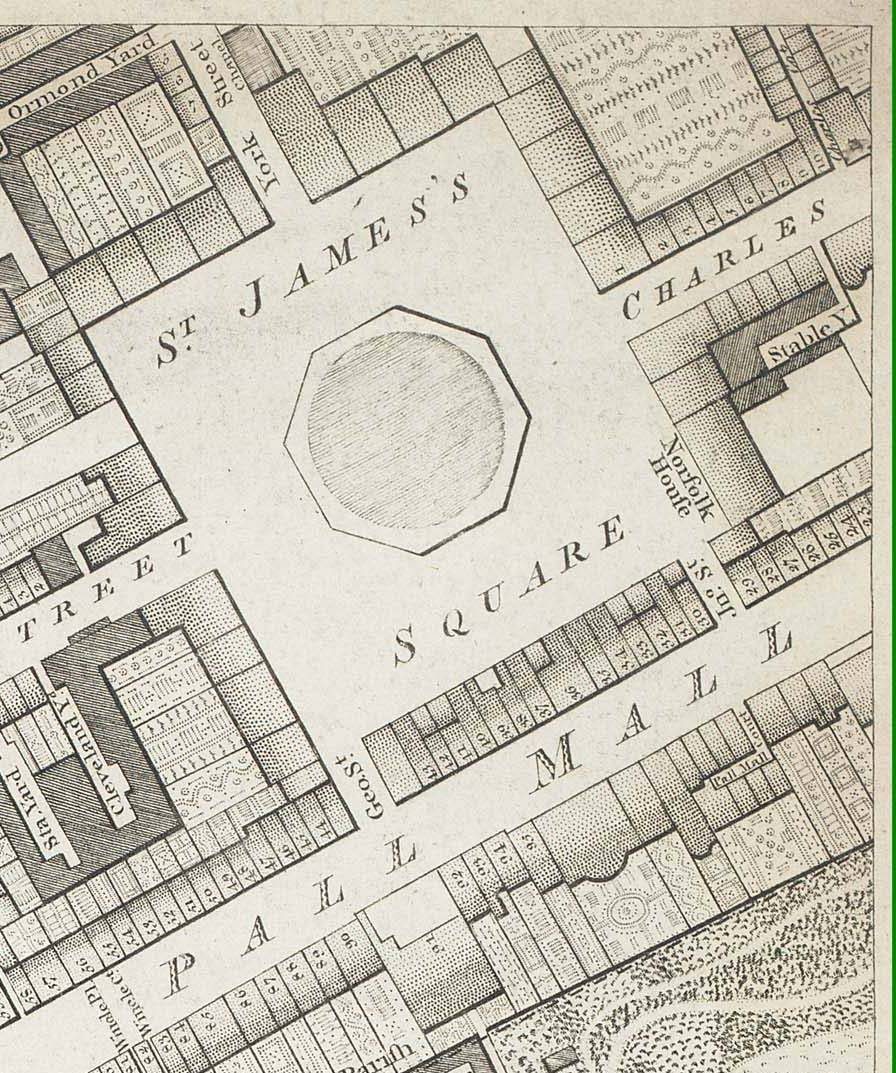
Pall Mall and St James's Square shown in Richard Horwood's map of 1799

The Crown kept the freehold of the land south of the street except for No. 79, which was granted to Nell Gwyn's trustees in 1676 or 1677 by Charles II. The buildings constructed on the south side of Pall Mall in subsequent years were grander than those on the north owing to stricter design and building standards imposed by the crown commissioners. When the main road was relocated further north, some houses suddenly had their backs facing the main road, losing available land for gardening. In 1664, residents filed a petition to turn the old road into gardens, which was successful. The trustees of the Earl of St Albans received a sixty-year lease on most of this from April 1665 so that trustees could issue sub-leases to their tenants.

Several other portions of the old highway were leased for construction. At the east end, land was leased to Sir Philip Warwick who built Warwick House (now the location of Warwick House Street) and to Sir John Denham; this parcel of land became part of the grounds of Marlborough House. Portions leased at the west end included the land between St James's Palace and the tennis court at the corner of St James's Street, and a parcel of land leased to the Duchess of Cleveland that became the site of 8–12 Cleveland Row and Stornoway House. The 18th-century London bookseller Andrew Millar also lived in a townhouse designed by Robert Adam, at 34 Pall Mall.

104 Pall Mall was rebuilt in 1761–2 by John, second Earl of Egmont. Sir John Soane remodelled the house in 1793–4 for Lady Louisa Manners, Countess of Dysart who lived there until 1831. From 1831 to 1836 it was used for the storage and exhibition of the Royal picture collection. In 1836 it was acquired by the Reform Club.

=== Later history ===
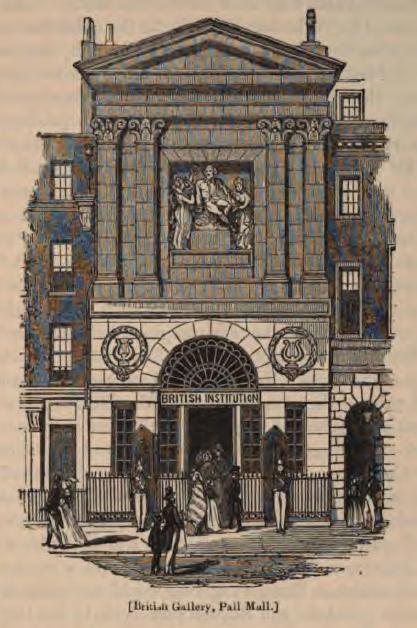
George Dance the Younger's Shakespeare Gallery at 52 Pall Mall was built in 1788 and demolished 1868–1869. It is shown in 1851 after its purchase by the British Institution.

By the 18th century, Pall Mall was well known for its shops as well as its grand houses. The shops included that of the Vulliamy family who made clocks at No. 68 between 1765 and 1854. Robert Dodsley ran a bookshop at No. 52, where he suggested the idea of a dictionary to Samuel Johnson. Writers and artists began to move to Pall Mall during this century; both Richard Cosway and Thomas Gainsborough lived at Schomberg House at Nos. 80–82.

The street was one of the first in London to be lit by gas after Frederick Albert Winsor set up experimental lighting on 4 June 1807 to celebrate King George III's birthday. Permanent lighting was installed in 1820. The eastern end of Pall Mall was widened between 1814 and 1818; a row of houses on its north side was demolished to make way for the Royal Opera Arcade.

Pall Mall is known for the various gentlemen's clubs built there in the 19th and early 20th centuries. The Travellers Club was founded in 1819 and moved to No. 49 Pall Mall in 1822. Its current premises at No. 106 were built in 1823 by Charles Barry. The Athenaeum Club took its name from the Athenaeum in Rome, a university founded by the Emperor Hadrian. The club moved to No. 107 Pall Mall in 1830 from tenements in Somerset House. Its entrance hall was designed by Decimus Burton. The Reform Club at Nos. 104–105 was founded for the British Radicals in 1836. The Army and Navy Club at Nos. 36–39 was founded in 1837. The name was suggested by the Duke of Wellington in order to accommodate Royal Navy members. Other clubs on Pall Mall include the United Service Club (now occupied by the Institute of Directors), the Oxford and Cambridge Club and the Royal Automobile Club.

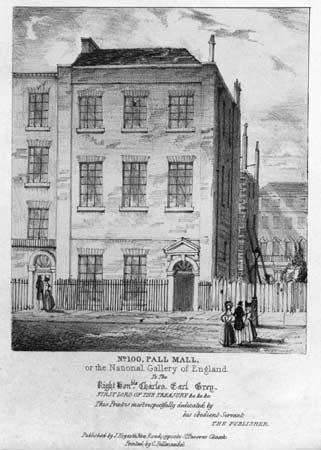
No. 100 Pall Mall, location of the National Gallery between 1824 and 1834

Pall Mall was once the centre of London's fine art scene; in 1824 the Royal Academy, the National Gallery and Christie's auction house were all based on the street.

The freehold of much of the southern side of the Pall Mall is owned by the Crown Estate. In addition to St James's Palace, Marlborough House, which was once a royal residence, is its neighbour to the east, opening off a courtyard just to the south of the street. It was built for Sarah, Duchess of Marlborough who laid the foundation stone in 1709, with building complete by 1711. The house reverted to Crown ownership in 1817; the future King George V was born here in 1865 and briefly lived in the house as Prince of Wales during the reign of his father, Edward VII. It became government-owned in 1959 and houses now the Commonwealth Secretariat and the Commonwealth Foundation. The Prince Regent's Carlton House was built at the eastern end of Pall Mall in 1732 for Frederick, Prince of Wales and later inhabited by his widow, Princess Augusta. A ball was held at the house on 19 June 1811 to celebrate the start of the Prince's regency, but ultimately he did not decide to stay in the house upon ascending the throne, and it was demolished. John Nash built Carlton House Terrace on its site between 1827 and 1832.

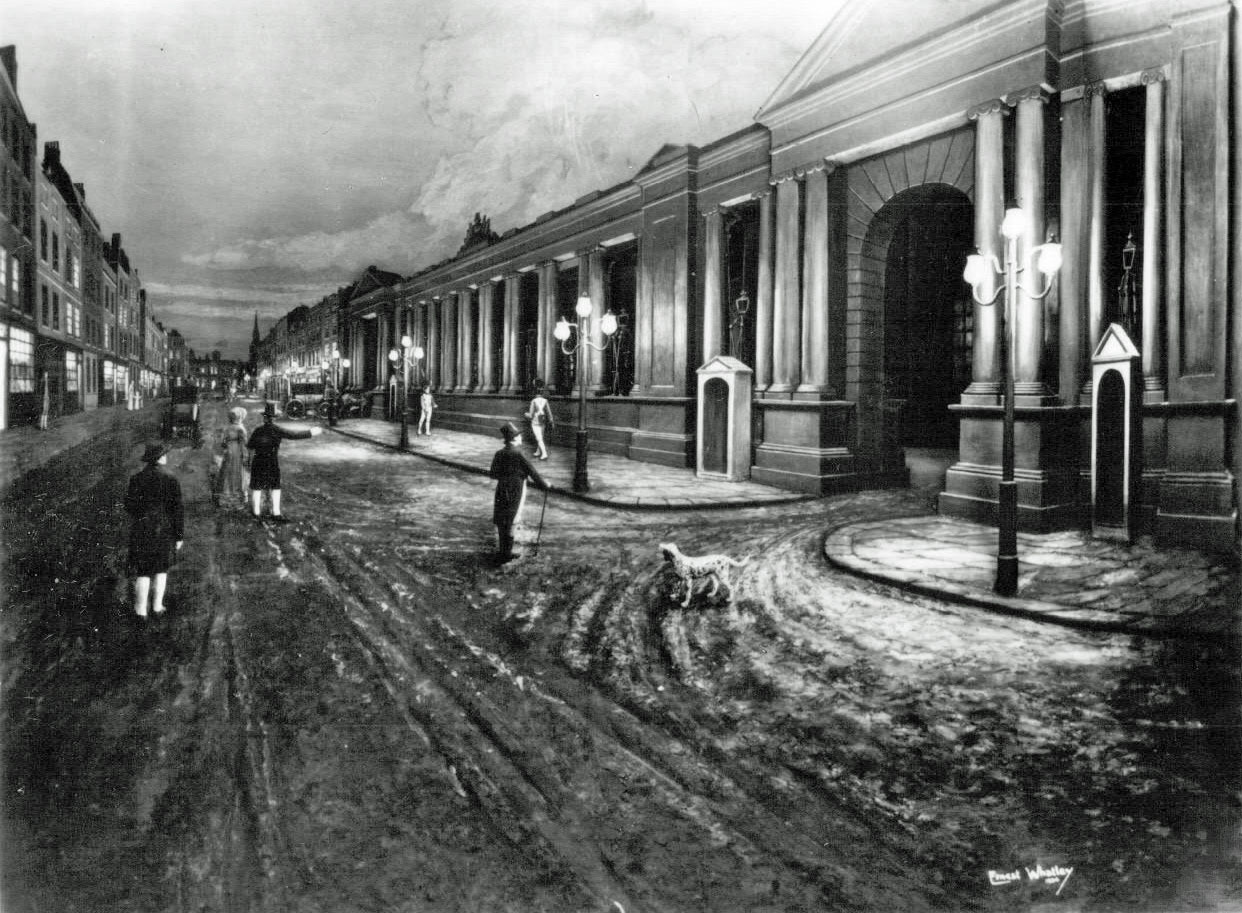
Pall Mall was one of the first streets in London to have gas lighting.

Pall Mall was the location of the War Office from 1855 to 1906, with which it became synonymous (just as Whitehall refers to the administrative centre of the UK government). The War Office was accommodated in a complex of buildings based on the ducal mansion, Cumberland House. The office subsequently moved to Whitehall.

The street contained two other architecturally important residences. Schomberg House, at Nos. 80–82 Pall Mall was built in 1698 for Meinhardt Schomberg, 3rd Duke of Schomberg and divided into three parts in 1769. The eastern section of the house was demolished in 1850, but reconstructed in the mid-1950s for office use. Buckingham House (Note: Not to be confused with the Buckingham House that later became Buckingham Palace.) was the London residence of the Dukes of Buckingham and Chandos. It was rebuilt in the 1790s by Sir John Soane and sold by the Buckingham estate in 1847. The house was demolished in 1908 to make way for the Royal Automobile Club.

By 1902, 7 Pall Mall was occupied by the Electric Lighting Board. A first-floor room was hired to allow viewing of Edward VII's coronation procession, which was cancelled after the king fell ill. This resulted in the legal case Chandler v Webster, concerned with the treatment of a frustrated contract.

No 77–78 Pall Mall was the home of the Marquess of Ailesbury from 1840. In 1892, it was inherited by the Marchioness' nephew, Viscount de Vesci who leased the building to the Office of Works. In 1902, it was granted to Queen Victoria's daughter, Princess Helena and her husband Prince Christian as a grace and favour residence and retained as a home by their daughters, Princess Helena Victoria and Princess Marie Louise until 1947. In 1951, the property was divided: No.77 was occupied by the Oxford and Cambridge University Club, and no.78 by the Eagle Star Insurance Company.

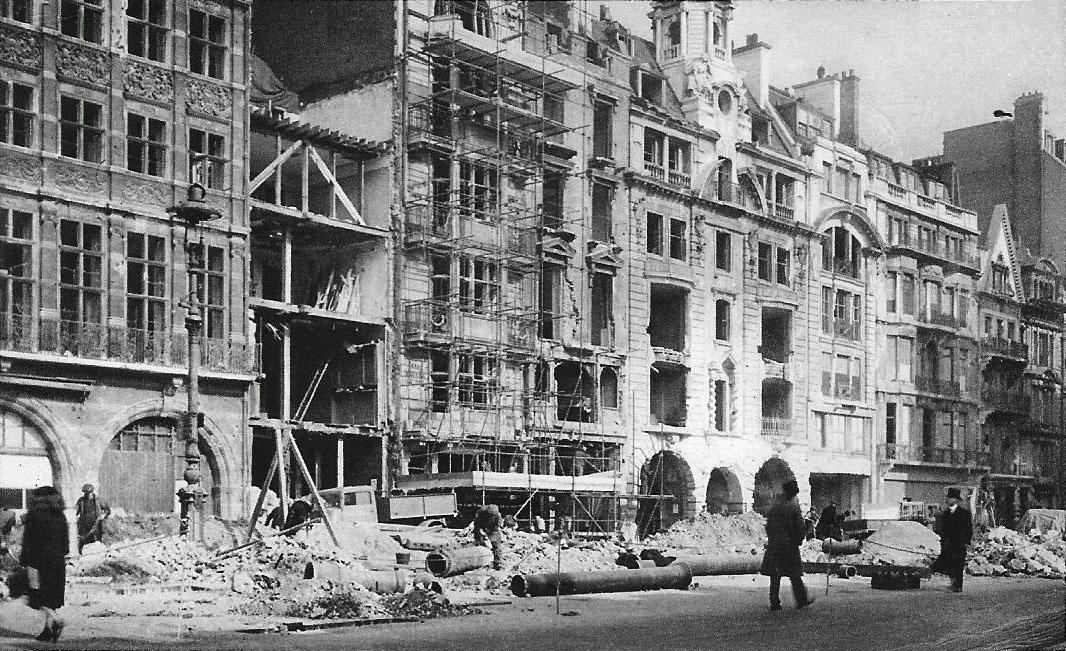
Pall Mall after an Operation Steinbock air-raid, February 1944

The Institute of Directors was founded in 1903 and received a royal charter in 1906. The former branch of the Midland Bank at Nos. 69–70 Pall Mall was designed by Edwin Lutyens and constructed between 1922 and 1927. The original plan to redevelop No. 70 proved impractical so the two premises were demolished to provide a site for the current premises. The cigarette manufacturer Rothmans has its head office at No. 65 Pall Mall, in a building designed by Norman Shaw, while P&O Ferries' main administrative office is at No. 79.

== Cultural references ==
Giacomo Casanova lived in Pall Mall during 1761 as "Chevalier de Seingalt" and documented the stay in his memoirs. When the novelist William Makepeace Thackeray visited Dublin in 1845, he compared Pall Mall to O'Connell Street (then known as Upper Sackville Street). In 1870, Henry Benjamin Wheatley wrote "Round about Piccadilly and Pall Mall", documenting changes in and around the street over the century. A compilation of Oscar Wilde's works, A Critic in Pall Mall : Being Extracts From Reviews And Miscellanies, was published in 1919, comprising essays he wrote for newspapers and journals from the 1870s to the 1890s.

Princess Elizabeth mentioned Pall Mall in her diary on celebrations on VE Day: "Out in crowd again," she wrote, "Trafalgar Square, Piccadilly, Pall Mall, walked simply miles. Saw parents on balcony at 12.30am – ate, partied, bed 3am!"

Pall Mall is part of a group of three squares on the British Monopoly board game, alongside Whitehall and Northumberland Avenue. All three streets converge at Trafalgar Square. Rising house prices across London mean a small flat on Pall Mall, which is in the lowest-priced third of properties on the board, now sells for over £1 million.

Charles Lamb, in his essay "The Superannuated Man," also mentioned this place. The narrator of the essay confesses that he used to "indent the gayer flags of Pall Mall." As the narrator is a superannuated man, he has ample time to spend. Among the means of spending time and enjoying his life is frequently visiting the club houses in Pall Mall, which gave him immense pleasure.

== See also ==
- 77–78 Pall Mall
- The Pall Mall Gazette
- List of gentlemen's clubs in London
- The Nine British Art
