= Fairfax Blomfield Wade-Palmer =

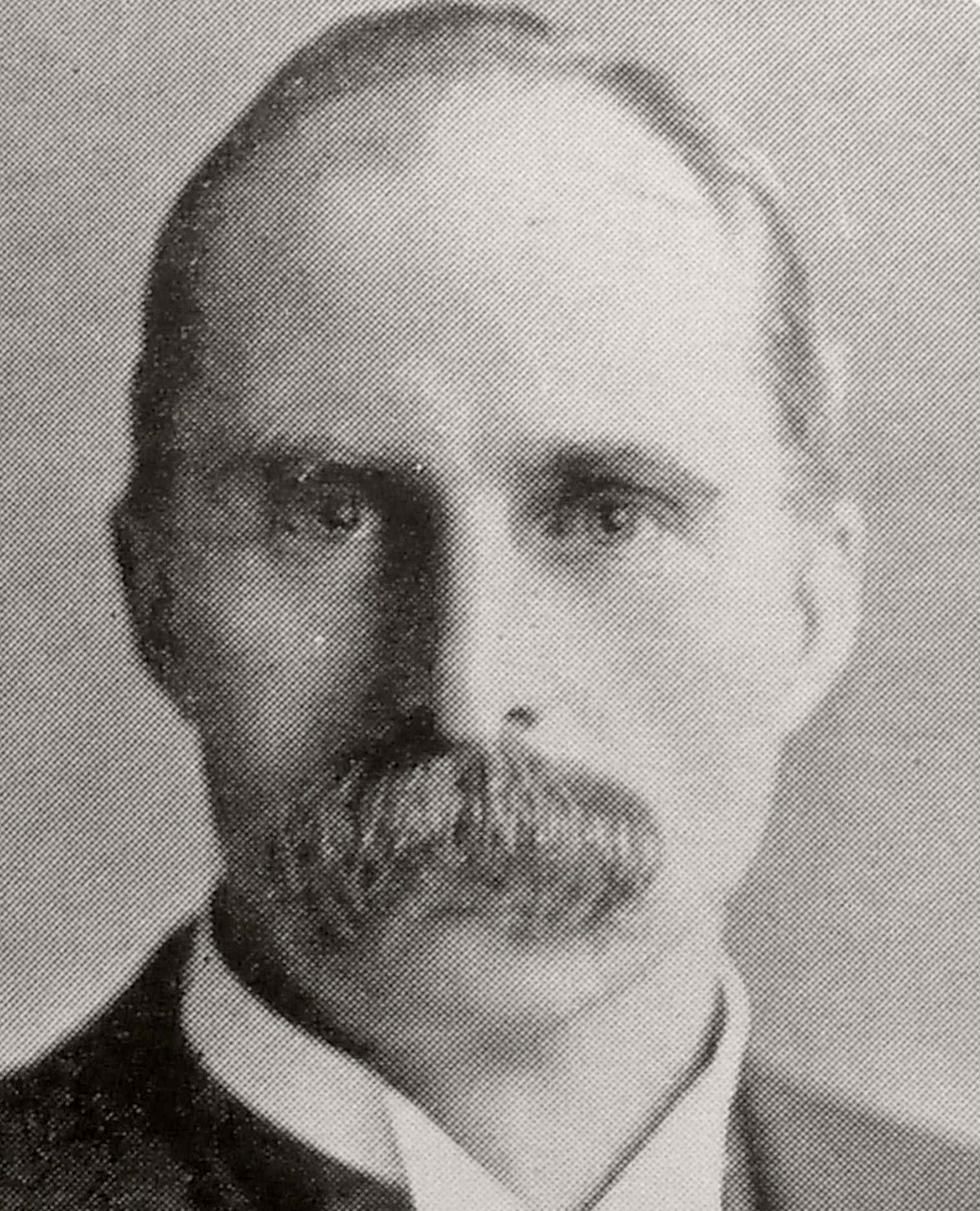
- Born: 16 July 1851; London, England
- Died: 11 January 1919 (aged 67–68); Chelsea, London, England
- Occupation: Architect

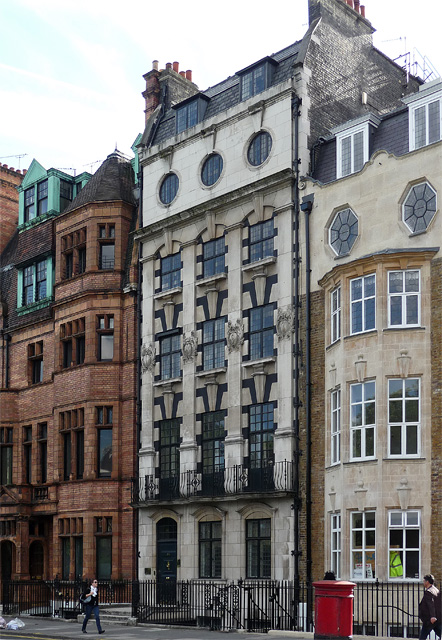
64 Sloane Street, designed by Wade-Palmer.

Fairfax Blomfield Wade-Palmer FRIBA, JP (1851 – 11 January 1919) was an English architect responsible for several buildings that are now listed by Historic England. He was also a noted textile designer. His sister Louisa Anne Wade led the Royal School of Needlework. He was one of the fourteen children of the Reverend Nugent Wade and Louisa (born Fenwick). He was educated at Radley College. He was a justice of the peace.

== Selected works ==
- 54 Mount Street, London.
- 64 Sloane Street.
- Colet House, 151 Talgarth Road, London W14.
- Sherfield Manor (parts)
- Compton House, Denton, Northamptonshire
- Condover Church, Shropshire - restoration of 1878.
