= Letitia Higgin =

British author and embroiderer

Letitia "Lily" Higgin
- Born: 20 November 1837; Lancaster, Lancashire, England
- Died: 30 November 1913 (aged 76); Maidenhead, England
- Other name: Hope Myddleton (nom de plume)
- Occupation: Writer
- Employer: Royal School of Needlework

Letitia "Lily" Higgin (20 November 1837 – 30 November 1913), known by her pen name Hope Myddleton, was a British novelist and writer on needlework.

== Life ==
Higgin was born in Lancaster in 1837. She was the last of ten children born to Sarah (née Winfield) and Thomas Houseman Higgin. Her father was the manager of the Belfast and Ballymena Railway and a part owner of Lancaster's White Cross cotton mill until 1846. He was also the deputy governor and keeper of the town's castle and in 1836 he became the mayor of Lancaster for a year. Her elder brother George was a civil engineer in Spain and after her father died in 1861 she went to live with him. In 1868 "La Corte: Letters from Spain, 1863–1866" was published and she is the presumed to be "A. Resident" who wrote the book.

== The Handbook of Embroidery ==
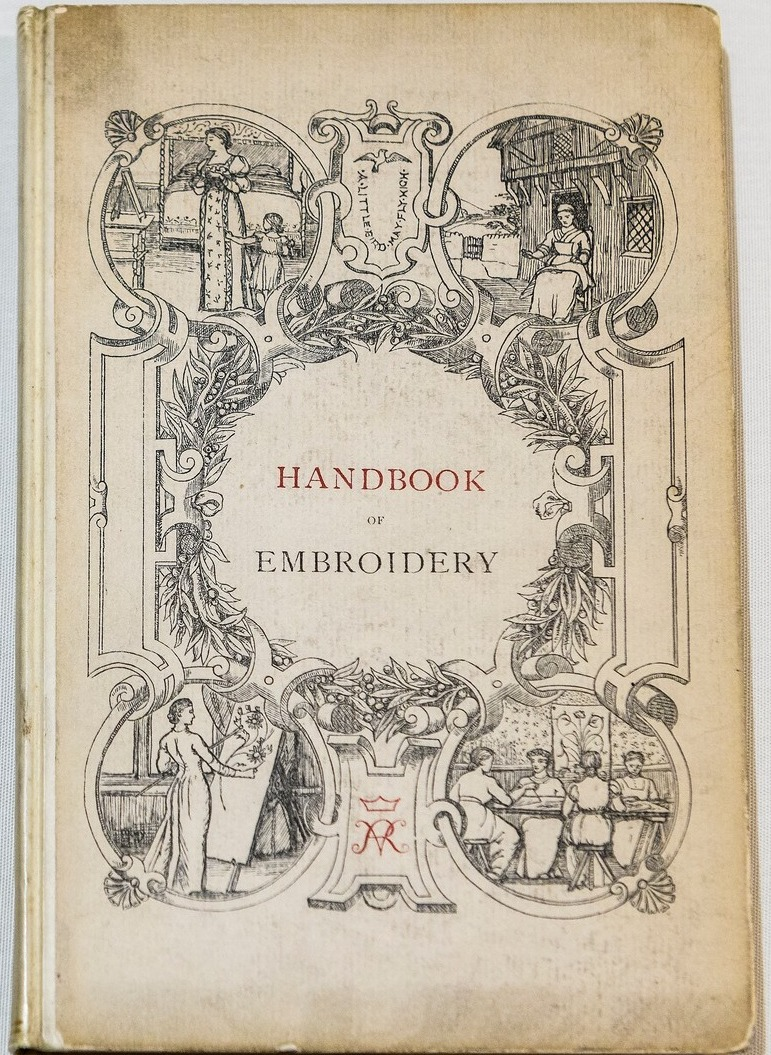
Letitia Higgin's 1880 book on embroidery

In 1871, she was living with her elder sisters Martha and Sarah Anne and they began work at the Royal School of Needlework which had been founded by Victoria, Lady Welby. It employed twenty women above a shop in Sloane Street. It existed to keep the skill of hand embroidery going and to provide employment for impoverished ladies. In 1875, the school became the Royal School of Art Needlework, and Letitia joined them in 1876 as a secretarial assistant.

The school's manager, Louisa Wade, reorganised the school in 1877 and Letitia became her assistant. Higgin worked to create the school's first technical guidebook which was edited by the school's vice-president, Lady Marian Alford, and published in 1880. The Handbook of Embroidery included designs by William Morris, "Miss Jekyll" and Edward Burne-Jones and other designers associated with the school. The book was such a success that two pirated versions appeared in America. There were proposals for a second edition but Higgin and Alford had an unresolved copyright dispute.

Her first of several novels was "Margaret Grantley: A Study in Black and White" by "L. Higgin". This was published in 1885.

Higgin wrote another book about Spain. She returned from Spain and died in Maidenhead in 1913.

== Legacy ==
In 2011, the Royal School of Needlework reprinted her 1880 book. The new version includes an essay by the chief archivist noting the book's history and the impact of this "fascinating volume".

The Oxford Dictionary of National Biography published an entry on Higgin in August 2024, alongside another needlewoman Jane Gaugain (1804-1860).
