= 77–78 Pall Mall =

Building in Westminster, London, England

Coordinates: 51.5057°N 0.1362°W

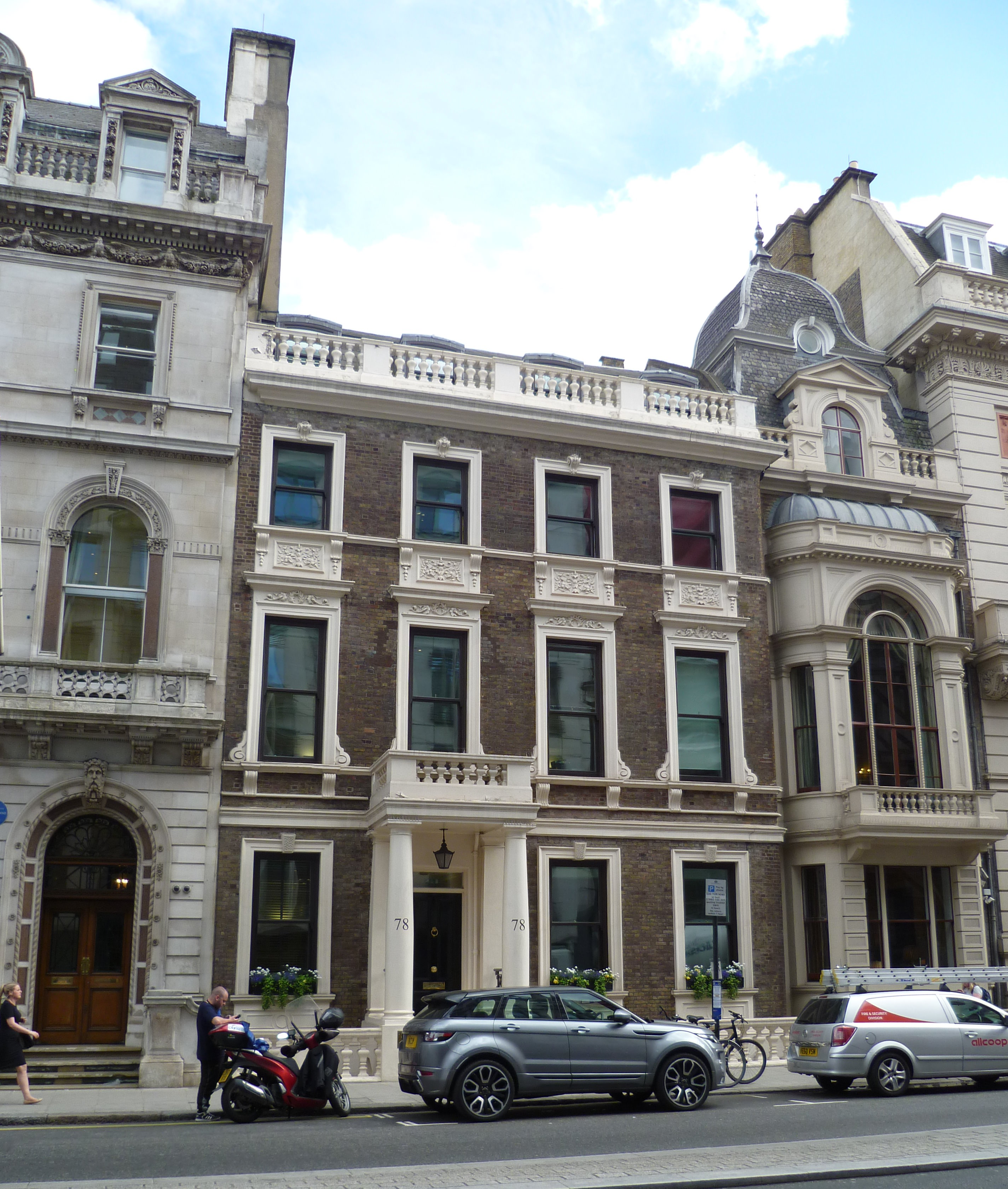
78 Pall Mall, London.

77–78 Pall Mall is a grade II listed building in Pall Mall, London. It is currently used as a business centre.

== Occupants ==
The leasehold of the houses at 77 and 78 Pall Mall was bequeathed to John Vesey, 4th Viscount de Vesci during the early 1890s, and by the beginning of the 20th century the house had come to be known as De Vesci House.

In 1900 the leasehold was purchased by the Office of Works, who offered the residence to the Crown Estate for use as a grace-and-favour residence in exchange for Bushy House, Middlesex. The offer was accepted, and in 1901 No. 77 and No. 78 were reconverted into a single residence. A Royal Warrant was issued on 9 August 1902 granting the right to occupy the house to the King's sister Princess Helena (then known as Princess Christian of Schleswig-Holstein).

By 1906 the House had come to be known as Schomberg House, a name which had previously been associated with a nearby property at 80 - 82 Pall Mall, which has been a source of confusion in distinguishing the two properties ever since.

Princess Helena died in 1923, and 77-78 Pall Mall was granted as a grace-and-favour residence to her two daughters Princess Helena Victoria and Princess Marie Louise, who continued to use the House as their London residence. The house sustained some bombing damage during the Second World War, and Princesses Helena Victoria and Marie Louise vacated the property in early 1947.

The Office of Works subsequently re-divided the House into two separate properties between 1950 and 1951; No. 77 was taken over by the neighbouring Oxford and Cambridge Club, and No. 78 was leased by Eagle Star Insurance Co..
