= Beryl Dean =

British embroiderer

- Born: 2 August 1911; Bromley
- Died: 2001 (aged 89–90)
- Known for: religious embroidery

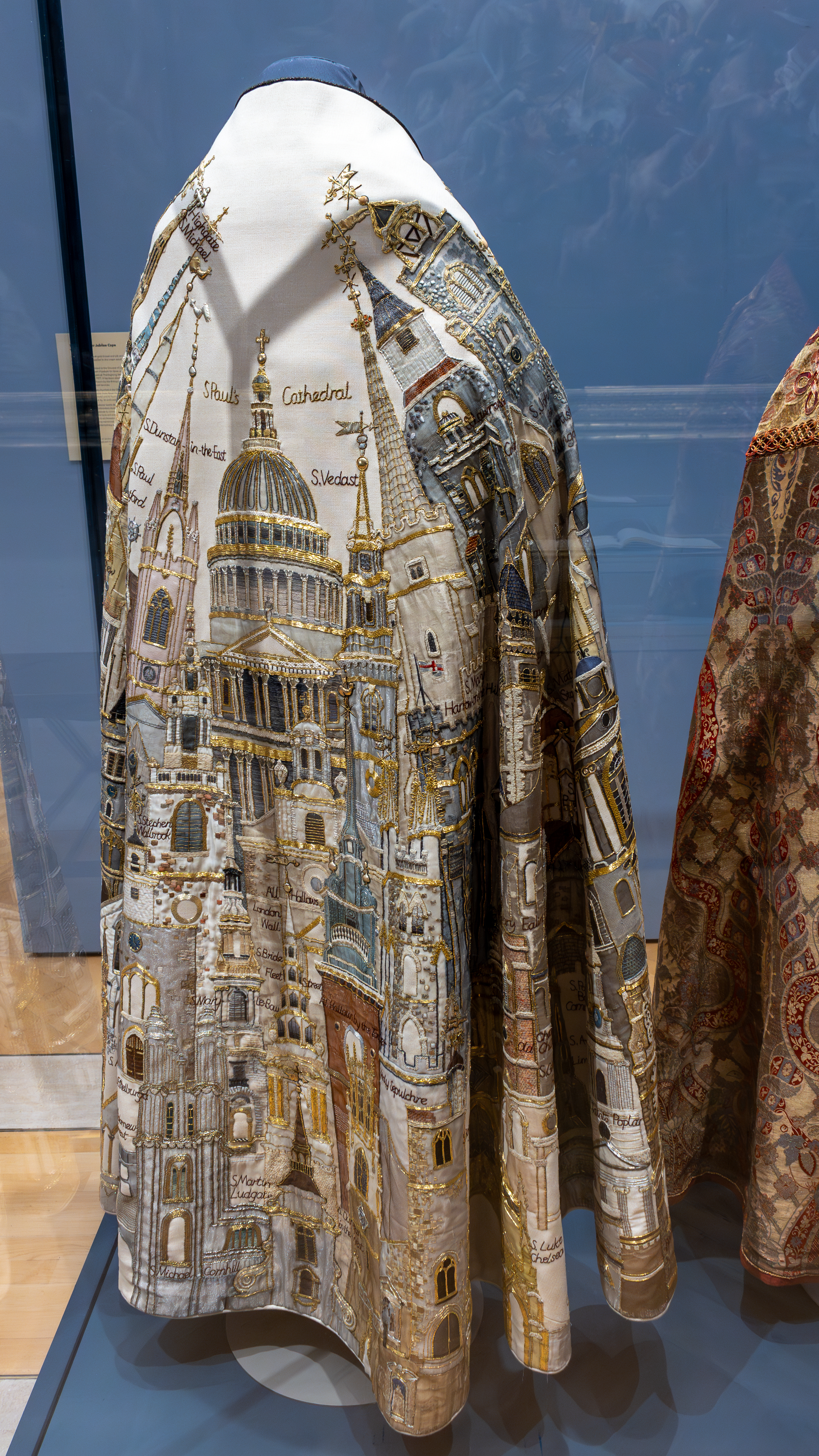
Cope designed by Dean for the Silver Jubilee of Elizabeth II

Beryl Dean MBE (2 August 1911 – 2001) was a British embroiderer. She was known for rejecting the traditional Victorian designs and for creating her own contemporary embroidery designs.

== Life ==
Dean was born in Bromley in 1911. Her mother, Marion, was a natural artist and her father was a share dealer. She gained her skills at the Royal School of Needlework. She graduated in 1932 and went on to study dress design and leatherwork at Bromley School of Art. Her early promise was recognised in 1935 when the Royal College of Art gave her a Royal Exhibition.

In 1946 she left the Eastbourne School of Art, where she was lecturer for seven years, to join King's College, Newcastle upon Tyne. In response to concern that textile skills were diminishing, Dean helped the Needlework Development Scheme who were trying to re-energise needlework teaching in schools.

Dean rejected the traditional Victorian designs used in religious embroidery and sought to create her own contemporary designs. In the 1950s she took on commissions from Guildford and Chelmsford Cathedrals, King's Lynn Minster, St Martin's Church, Dorking, and St Giles' in Northbrook, Illinois.

In 1958 she published her book "Ecclesiastical Embroidery" and lectures on the subject in Britain and America. In 1968 she established new interest in the subject when she helped curate an exhibition at St Paul's Cathedral, and groups of people interested in contemporary ecclesiastical embroidery formed in Britain.

In 1969, with funding that included the descendants of the Knights of the Garter, Dean set out on a five-year task to create five embroidered panels to hang in the Rutland chantry of St George's Chapel at Windsor Castle. The five panels represent the annunciation, the visitation, the adoration of the magi, the temptation of Christ in the wilderness, and the miracle at Cana. Only one of the panels is normally on display to the public.

Dean designed a cope for the Silver Jubilee of Elizabeth II in 1977, depicting churches in the diocese of London including St. Paul's Cathedral. This was worn by the Bishop of London at the jubilee celebrations.

Dean died on 27 March 2001. Her 1984 piece "Head of Christ" is in the Victoria and Albert Museum. The embroidery, which uses a difficult technique, was inspired not by a commission, but by Dean's imperative to give good use to some remaining skeins of Japanese gold thread.

== Selected publication ==
- Ecclesiastical Embroidery (1958)
- Church Needlework (1961)
- Ideas for Church Embroidery (1968)
- Creative Applique (1970)
- Embroidery for Religion and Ceremonial (1981).
