= Wemyss School of Needlework =

- Type: Public
- Established: 1877
- Principal: Dora Wemyss
- Address: Main Street, Coaltown of Wemyss, Fife, KY1 4NX, Coaltown of Wemyss
- Website: wemyssneedlework.com

The Wemyss School of Needlework was founded in 1877 by Dora Wemyss to teach a skill to local girls to enable them to earn a living. Today, the school still operates in its purpose-built building at Coaltown of Wemyss in Fife, Scotland, and includes a museum and archive.

== History ==
The school was founded by Dora Wemyss in 1877. She was a wealthy philanthropist, and the great granddaughter of William IV and his mistress Dora Jordan. The school was based on the Royal School of Needlework in London, but from a philanthropic standpoint. It was intended to teach local girls a skill to earn a living, with them being offered a six month apprenticeship. Those who were particularly skilled could stay on at the school as employees. Their exquisite work made them very sought after, and gave them a rare independence from fathers or husbands. It was originally based in Wemyss Castle, and moved in 1880 to a purpose-built house on the main street of Coaltown of Wemyss.

== Museum and archive ==
The Wemyss School of Needlework is home to a private museum and archive housing an important Scottish collection. The collection includes hundreds of samples (some dating back to Jacobean times), tissue tracings, class registers, order books and price lists. Although the building has remained open since 1880, it fell into disrepair over time and the collection had to be temporarily moved to West Wemyss while the building was renovated in 2011. In 2016, for the first time since 1936, an exhibition of the Wemyss school works ran outside of the school building at St Andrews Museum. Sewing Independence: Revealing the Wemyss School of Needlework was curated by students at the University of St Andrews and explored the history and continuing legacy of the school.

== Recent ==
In the 1995 New Year Honours, the manager of the school, Mary Dorothy Birrell, was awarded the M.B.E. for services to Needlework.
