= Toye, Kenning & Spencer =

British jewellery and clothing manufacturer

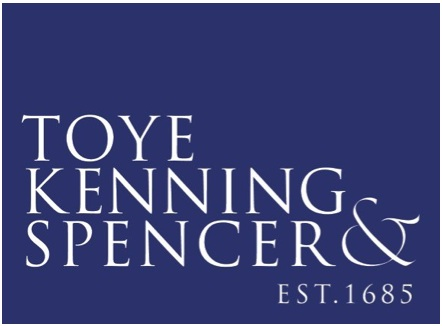
- Type: Private Limited Company
- Industry: Jewellery, Haberdashery, Clothing, Dress uniforms, Ribbons & Medals
- Founded: 1685
- Headquarters: Bedworth, England
- Key people: Charles Toye, CEO
- Revenue: ▲£4.23 million (2008)
- Operating income: ▼£131,007 (2008)
- Net income: ▼£195,082 (2008)
- Number of employees: Approximately 120 (2024)
- Website: www.toye.com

Toye, Kenning & Spencer (TKS) is a British jewellery and clothing manufacturer based at Bedworth in Warwickshire and the Jewellery Quarter in Birmingham. Founded in 1685, the company still retains Toye family members.

The firm holds a Royal Warrant from King Charles III for "Supply of Gold and Silver Laces, Insignia and Embroidery". It supplies honours badges and ribbons presented at investitures and is the sole supplier of the Order of the British Empire's buttonhole insignia. The company has also been commissioned to produce semi-official commemorative coins for politically important events aimed at improving diplomatic relations with the United Kingdom.

== History ==
=== Early history ===
The Toyé family arrived in England in 1685 as Huguenot refugees, following the revocation of the Edict of Nantes by Louis XIV. Arriving up the Thames disguised as cattle-dealers, the family settled in Hope Town, now known as Turin Street in Bethnal Green. Here they resumed the traditional family business of weaving, lace-making, embroidery and gold and silver wire-making. In 1784 Guillaume-Henri Toyé was established in this industry and living with his family in Hope Town. He had four sons and three daughters.

In 1835 William Toyé (grandson of Guillaume) acquired larger premises at George Street, Bethnal Green. At first, he applied himself to broad weaving but other forms of weaving soon appealed to him, particularly the making of ribbons, as there was then a far larger demand for this commodity. It was found necessary to open retail establishments further west in London in addition to the factories. A shop was opened in 1888 at 18 Little Britain, and a short time later, a further establishment was opened at 17 Clerkenwell Road.

By 1890 the weaving of heavy, double-twilled silks, nine-feet wide, for trade-union and Friendly Societies became an important part of the business. The banner department used painting and embroidery to illuminate the designs. With increased and varied activities, it became apparent that the factory at 186 Old Ford Road was inadequate. The Masonic section was rapidly becoming more important, therefore it was essential to move the factory nearer to the headquarters of freemasonry in Great Queen Street. Premises were acquired in 1898 at 57 Theobalds Road where showrooms were opened, the factory being placed at the rear and continuing right through the block into Red Lion Square.

=== 1900 to present ===
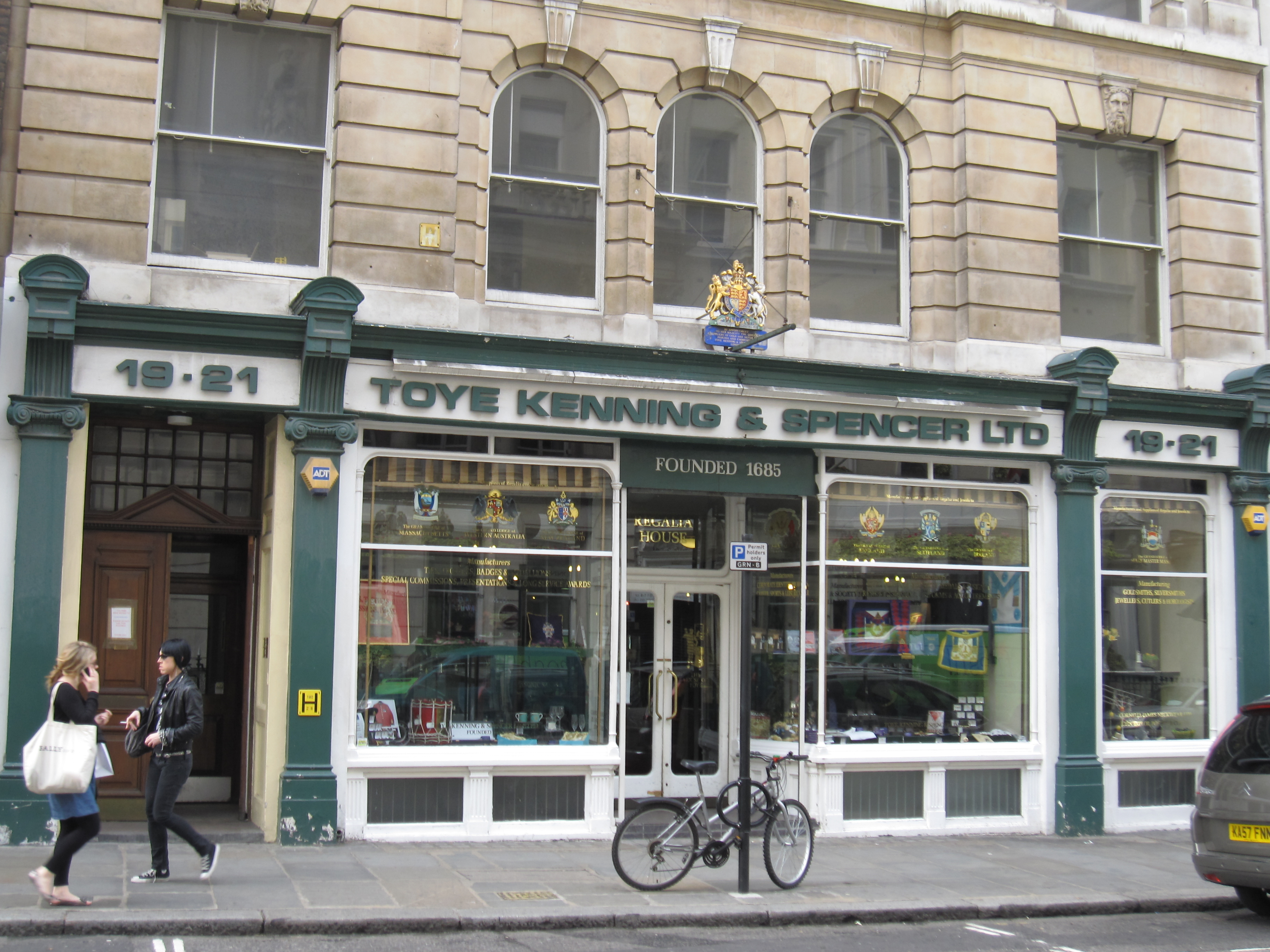
The company's former shop at 19–21 Great Queen Street in London (2011)

In 1903 Herbert Toye joined the business, a step made necessary by the considerable expansions that had taken place. In 1909 it became necessary, in accordance with the Companies Act 1908, to register the firm as a company. From then on, all business was transacted as Toye & Co. In 1910 William Toye, Senior, died and under the terms of his Will, his sons William, Frederick and Herbert and Timothy J Mister all became partners in the business.

In 1930 it was necessary to rebuild and enlarge the main factory in Red Lion Square, London. Then came a fresh crisis: Britain was hit by the global depression, and three million people were thrown out of work. During these dismal days of dole queues and empty larders, Toye maintained full employment, an accolade for the management. In 1937 the coronation of King George VI and Queen Elizabeth gave the company another massive trade boost and provided an outlet for the skilled crafts of their staff. They worked day and night for six months producing banners, emblems, robes and insignia for that historic occasion. The velvet cushions on which the Royal Crowns were carried into Westminster Abbey were made by Toye women in conjunction with the Royal School of Needlework.

In 1947 George Kenning acquired Spencer & Co, and were themselves acquired by Toye & Co in 1956. The current brand name of Toye, Kenning & Spencer was adopted in 1962.

In 1949 Miss Henrietta E Toye, who had completed thirty years' service on the sales side, was elected to the Board; few firms at that time had elected women to board level.

In 2010 after years of Labour Government, Toye lost a multimillion-pound contract with the Ministry of Defence due to pricing concerns, and is now enjoying a Brexit bounce.

== Manufacturing facilities ==
=== Birmingham ===
Toye's factory, W.J. Dingley Ltd, in Birmingham's Jewellery Quarter is home to the group's metal manufacturing. Every stage in the manufacture of a metal product takes place there. Products include medals, badges and buttons, chains of office and insignia for heads of state and dignitaries, jewellery and cufflinks, presentation cups for sporting organisations and commemorative plaques. The FA Cup medals are made by Toye.

=== Bedworth ===
The group's textile production is in Bedworth, near Coventry. There, Toye specialises in narrow fabric weaving, manufacturing coloured ribbons, braids and laces for military, homeland security, club, association, school and fashion markets worldwide. Bedworth also specialises in hand and machine embroidery, and making crafted hats and caps for the military, homeland security, corporate, sports and show business markets. Customers range from the MOD and overseas defence forces, to international fashion houses, sporting organisations and local schools. Honours caps for the Rugby Football Union, buttons for Henley Royal Regatta and Grand National ties were produced there.
