= Carl Ruland =

German art and literary historian

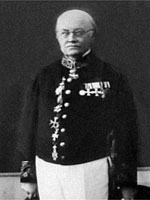
- Dr. Ruland in 1902

Private Secretary to the Prince Consort
- In office 18 June 1859 – 14 December 1861
- Preceded by: Ernst Becker
- Succeeded by: Office defunct

Personal details
- Born: 15 July 1834; Free City of Frankfurt, German Confederation
- Died: 13 November 1907 (aged 73); Weimar, German Empire
- Spouse: Marie Schulz (m. 1873)
- Children: 1
- Occupation: Art historian; literary historian; librarian; civil servant

Carl Heinrich Ruland (15 July 1834 – 13 November 1907) was a German art and literary historian. He served as private secretary and librarian to Albert, Prince Consort, from 1859 until the prince's death in 1861.

He is also remembered for his romance with Princess Helena, which resulted in his expulsion from the British royal court.

== Biography ==
Ruland was born on 15 July 1834 in Frankfurt, then a free city within the German Confederation. From 1851, he studied philosophy and art history at the University of Bonn and the University of Tübingen.

After his doctorate, he appointed to the Royal Household at Windsor Castle in 1859 upon the recommendation of Baron Stockmar. He began working for Albert, Prince Consort, as his private secretary, librarian, and manager of the royal art collection.

Ruland quickly became considered a close confidante of the royal family, and after Albert's death in 1861, he remained as a private secretary to Queen Victoria and her children for a few years. When it was discovered that Ruland had been engaging in flirtations with Victoria and Albert's third daughter, Princess Helena, he was dismissed from court and returned to Germany. He supposedly never returned to the Queen's favour after this incident.

In 1870 and back in Germany, he was appointed as Director of the Grand Ducal Art Collections and Museums of Weimar by Charles Alexander, Grand Duke of Saxe-Weimar-Eisenach. In 1886, he was appointed director of the newly founded Goethe-Nationalmuseum and president of the Goethe-Gesellschaft. In 1894, he became a member of the Erfurter Akademie. He was also one of the authors of the Allgemeine Deutsche Biographie, considered one of the most important and comprehensive biographical works in the German language.

In March 1873, he accompanied Victoria and Albert's second daughter, Princess Alice, on her tour to Florence and Rome. Alice wrote to her mother: "The Grand Duke of Weimar kindly allowed Mr. Ruland to accompany us as Cicerone, what a collection of paintings etc. He is very necessary."

On 20 November 1873 in Weimar, he married Marie Schulz, a former actress. They had one child together, Carl Günther Ruland (1874-1962).

Ruland died in Weimar on 13 November 1907, aged 73.

== Published works ==
- Die Luther-Ausstellung des Grossherzoglichen Museums zu Weimar, Grossherzogliches Museum, Weimar, 1883
- Die Schätze des Goethe-Nationalmuseums in Weimar, 1887
