= Princess Helena of the United Kingdom =

British princess, daughter of Queen Victoria (1846–1923)

Princess Helena
- Princess Christian of Schleswig-Holstein
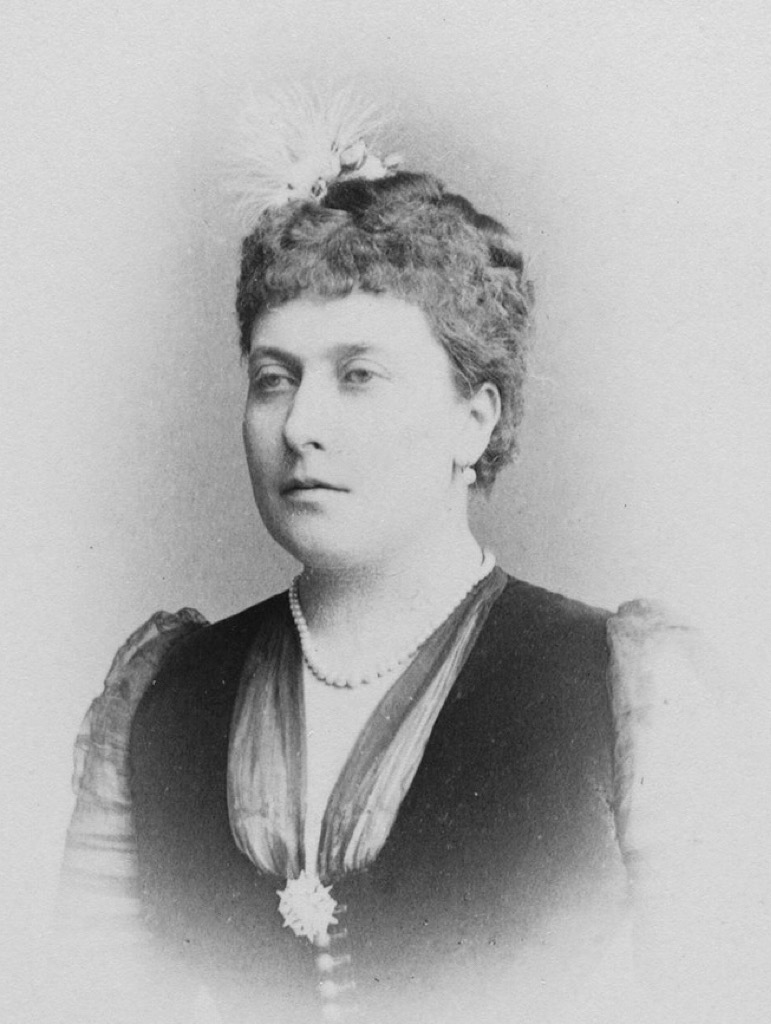
- Helena in 1887
- Born: 25 May 1846; Buckingham Palace, London, England
- Died: 9 June 1923 (aged 77); Schomberg House, London, England
- Burial: 15 June 1923 Royal Vault, St George's Chapel, Windsor Castle 28 October 1928 Royal Burial Ground, Frogmore
- Spouse: Prince Christian of Schleswig-Holstein (m. 1866; died 1917)
- Issue more...: Prince Christian Victor; Albert, Duke of Schleswig-Holstein; Princess Helena Victoria; Princess Marie Louise; Prince Harald
Names
- Helena Augusta Victoria
- House: Saxe-Coburg and Gotha (until 1917); Windsor (from 1917)
- Father: Prince Albert of Saxe-Coburg and Gotha
- Mother: Queen Victoria

Princess Helena (Helena Augusta Victoria; 25 May 1846 – 9 June 1923), later Princess Christian of Schleswig-Holstein, was the third daughter and fifth child of Queen Victoria and Prince Albert.

Helena was educated by private tutors chosen by her father and his close friend and adviser, Baron Stockmar. Her childhood was spent with her parents, travelling between a variety of royal residences in Britain. The intimate atmosphere of the royal court came to an end on 14 December 1861, when her father died and her mother entered a period of intense mourning. Afterwards, in the early 1860s, Helena began a flirtation with Prince Albert's German librarian, Carl Ruland. Although the nature of the relationship is largely unknown, Helena's romantic letters to Ruland survive. After her mother discovered the flirtations, in 1863, she dismissed Ruland, who returned to his native Germany. Three years later, on 5 July 1866, Helena married the impoverished Prince Christian of Schleswig-Holstein. The couple remained in Britain, in calling distance of the queen, who liked to have her daughters nearby. Helena, along with her youngest sister, Princess Beatrice, became the queen's unofficial secretary. However, after Queen Victoria's death on 22 January 1901, Helena saw relatively little of her surviving siblings.

Helena was the most active member of the royal family, carrying out an extensive programme of royal engagements. She was also an active patron of charities, and was one of the founding members of the British Red Cross. She was founding president of the Royal School of Needlework, and president of the Workhouse Infirmary Nursing Association and the Royal British Nurses' Association. As president of the latter, she was a strong supporter of nurse registration against the advice of Florence Nightingale. In 1916 she became the first member of her family to celebrate her 50th wedding anniversary, but her husband died a year later. Helena outlived him by six years, dying aged 77 in 1923.

== Early life ==
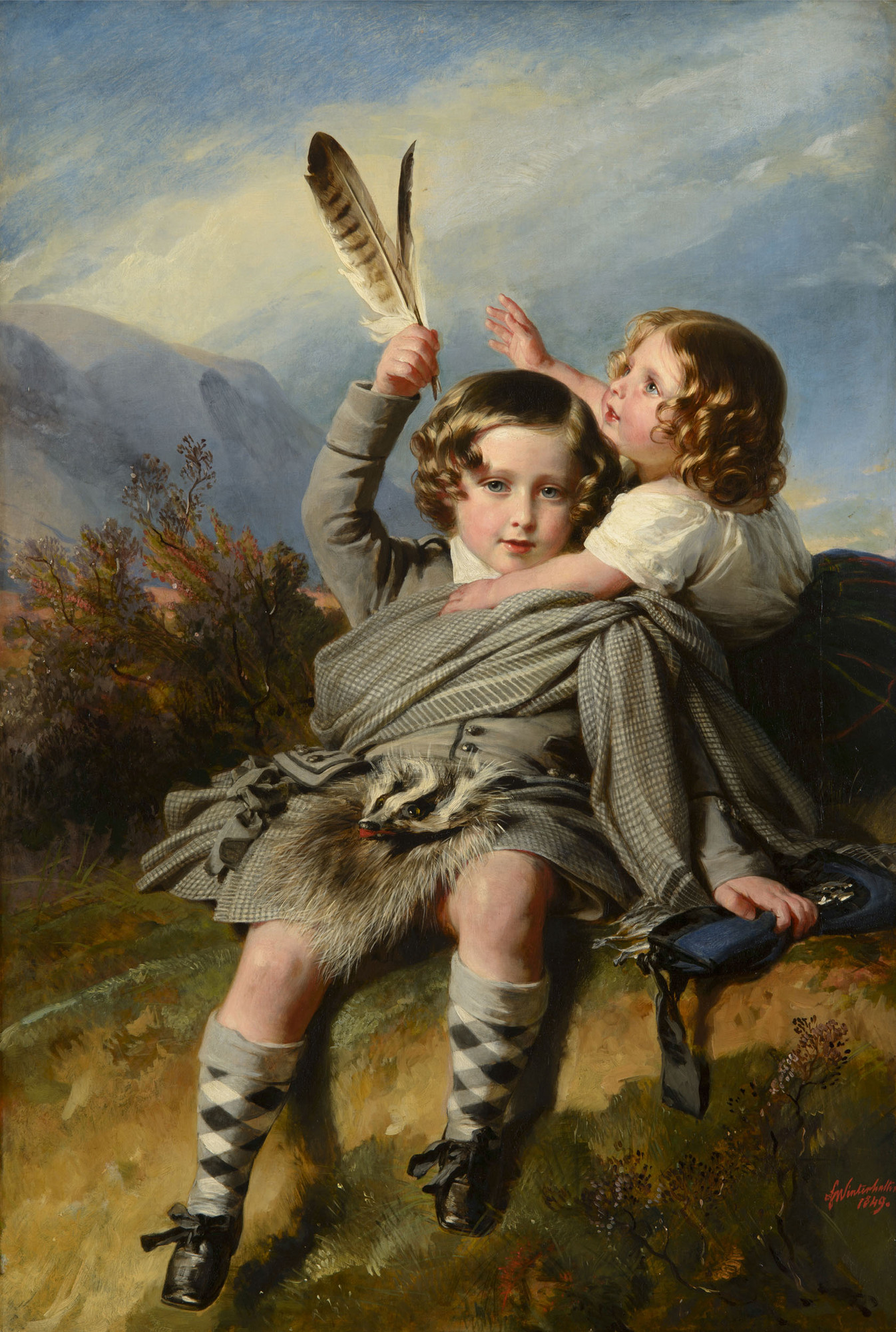
Princess Helena (right) with her brother Prince Alfred. Helena was Alfred's favourite sister. Portrait by Franz Xaver Winterhalter.

Helena was born at 3:00 pm on 25 May 1846 at Buckingham Palace. Albert reported to his brother, Ernest II, the Duke of Saxe-Coburg and Gotha, that Helena "came into this world quite blue, but she is quite well now". He added that the queen "suffered longer and more than the other times and she will have to remain very quiet to recover." Albert and Victoria chose the names Helena Augusta Victoria. The German nickname for Helena was Helenchen, later shortened to Lenchen, the name by which members of the royal family invariably referred to Helena. As the daughter of the sovereign, Helena was styled Her Royal Highness The Princess Helena from birth. Helena was baptised on 25 July in the private chapel at Buckingham Palace. Her godparents were the Hereditary Grand Duke of Mecklenburg-Strelitz (the husband of Queen Victoria's cousin); the Duchess of Orléans (for whom the queen's mother, the Duchess of Kent, stood proxy); and the Duchess of Cambridge (the queen's aunt).

Helena, a lively, outspoken child, reacted to brotherly teasing by punching the bully on the nose. Her early talents included drawing. Lady Augusta Stanley, a lady-in-waiting to the queen, commented favourably on the three-year-old Helena's artwork.

Like her sisters, she could play the piano to a high standard at an early age. Other interests included science and technology, shared by her father Prince Albert, and horse riding and boating, two of her favourite childhood occupations. However, Helena became a middle daughter following the birth of Princess Louise in 1848, and her abilities were overshadowed by her more artistic sisters.

=== Death of Prince Albert ===
Helena's father, Prince Albert, died on 14 December 1861. The queen was devastated, and ordered her household, along with her daughters, to move from Windsor to Osborne House, the queen's Isle of Wight residence. Helena's grief was also profound, and she wrote to a friend a month later: "What we have lost nothing can ever replace, and our grief is most, most bitter ... I adored Papa, I loved him more than anything on earth, his word was a most sacred law, and he was my help and adviser ... These hours were the happiest of my life, and now it is all, all over."

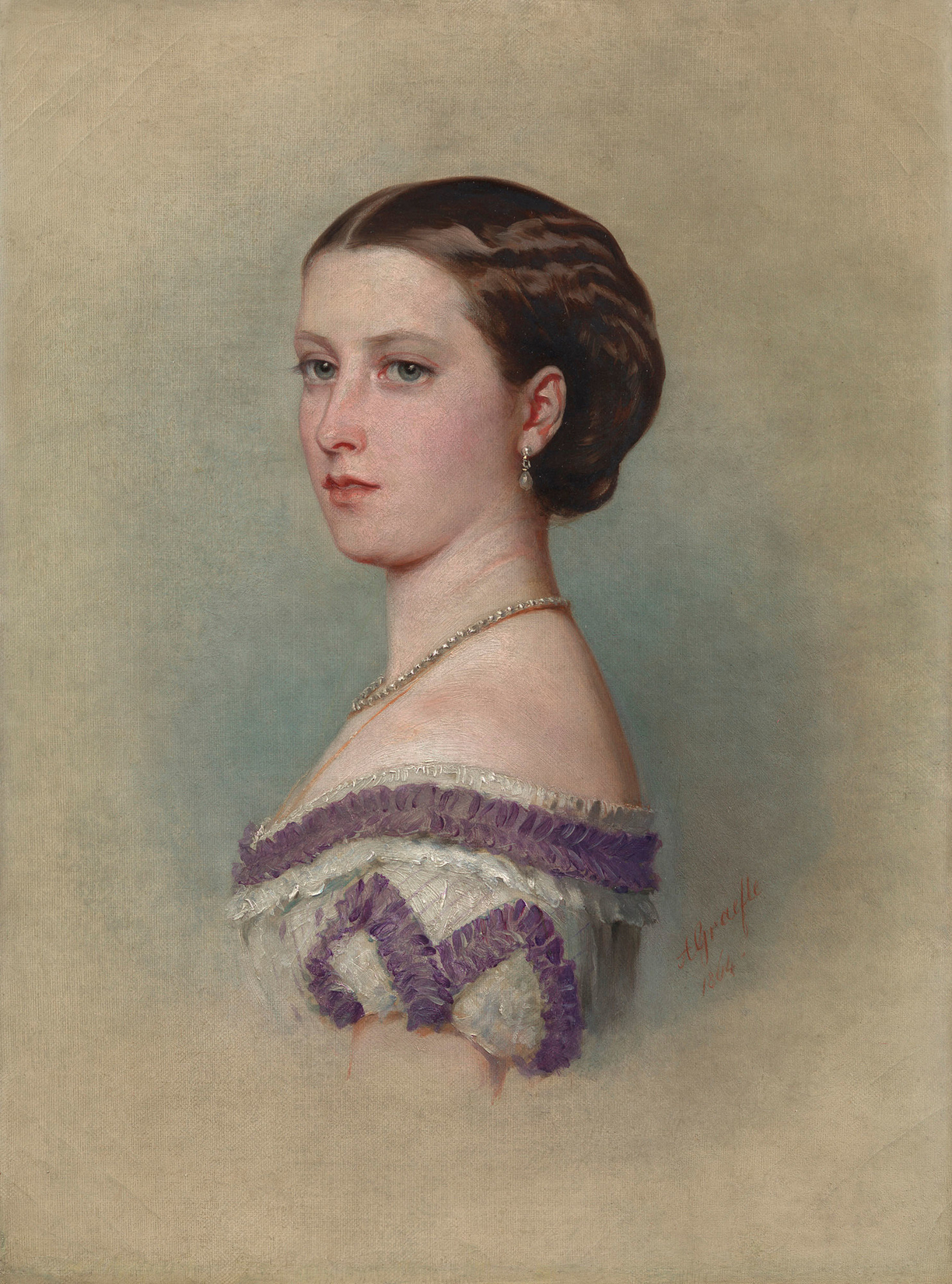
Princess Helena, a few months before the death of her father, Prince Albert of Saxe-Coburg and Gotha, 1861

The queen relied on her second-eldest daughter Princess Alice as an unofficial secretary, but Alice needed an assistant of her own. Though Helena was the next eldest, she was considered unreliable by Victoria because of her inability to go long without bursting into tears. Therefore, Louise was selected to assume the role in her place. Alice was married to Prince Louis of Hesse in 1862, after which Helena assumed the role—described as the "crutch" of her mother's old age by one biographer—at her mother's side. In this role, she carried out minor secretarial tasks, such as writing the queen's letters, helping her with political correspondence, and providing her with company.

== Marriage ==
=== Controversy ===
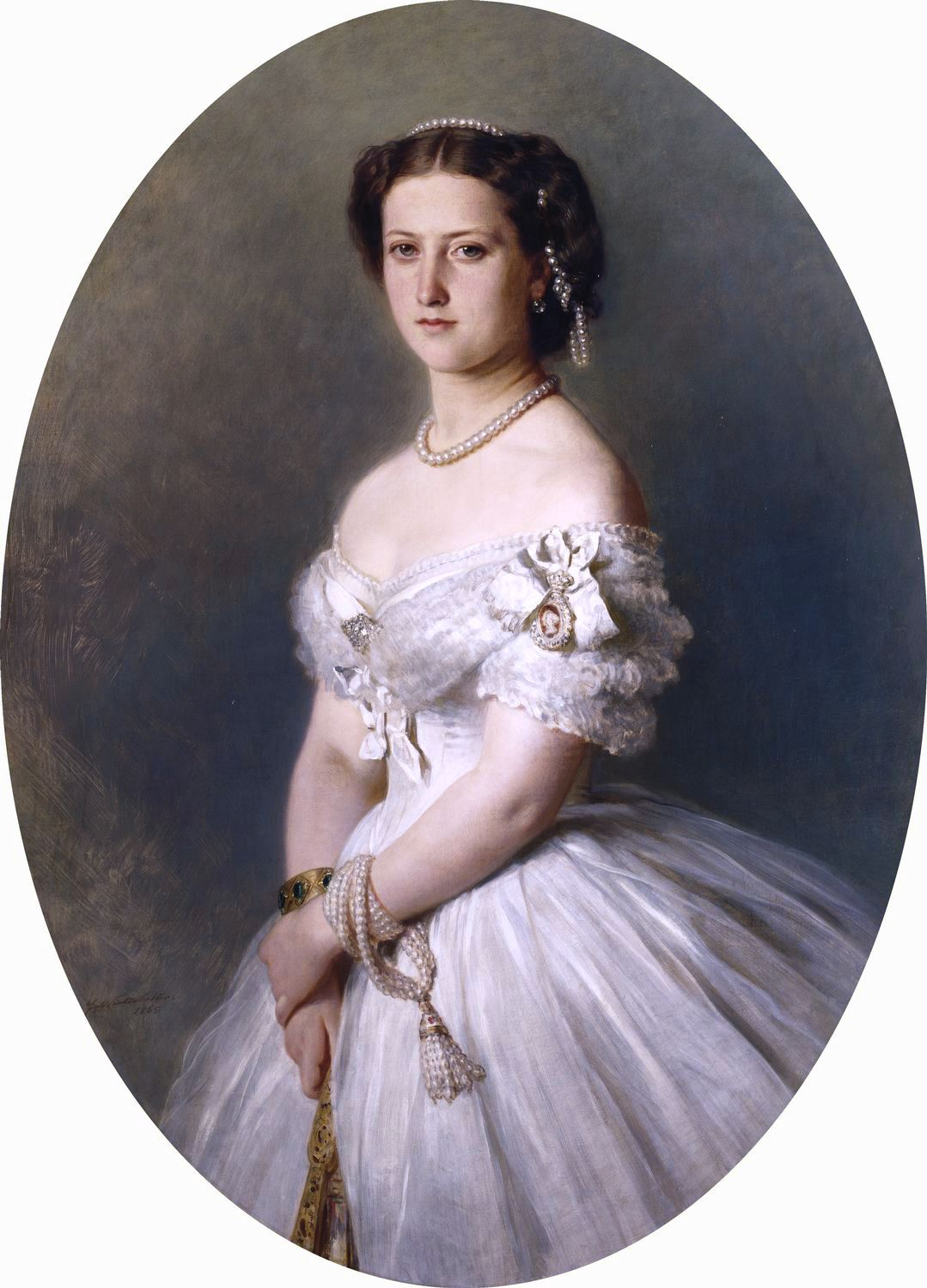
Portrait by Franz Xaver Winterhalter (1865). Currently at the Royal Collection.

Helena began an early flirtation with her father's former librarian, Carl Ruland, following his appointment to the Royal Household on the recommendation of Baron Stockmar in 1859. He was trusted enough to teach German to Helena's brother, the young Prince of Wales, and was described by the Queen as "useful and able". When the Queen discovered that Helena had grown romantically attached to a royal servant, he was promptly dismissed back to his native Germany, and he never lost the Queen's hostility.

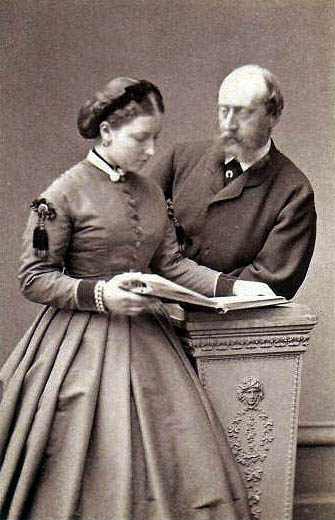
Princess Helena and Prince Christian, part of a series of photographs following their engagement in 1865

Following Ruland's departure in 1863, the Queen looked for a husband for Helena. However, as a middle child, the prospect of a powerful alliance with a European royal house was low. Her appearance was also a concern, as by the age of fifteen she was described by her biographer as chunky, dowdy and double-chinned. Furthermore, Victoria insisted that Helena's future husband had to be prepared to live near the Queen, thus keeping her daughter nearby. Her choice eventually fell on Prince Christian of Schleswig-Holstein; however, the match was politically awkward, and caused a severe breach within the royal family.

Schleswig and Holstein were two territories fought over between Prussia and Denmark during the First and Second Schleswig Wars. In the latter, Prussia and Austria defeated Denmark, but the duchies were claimed by Austria for Prince Christian's family. However, following the Austro-Prussian War, in which Prussia invaded and occupied the duchies, they became Prussian, but the title Duke of Schleswig-Holstein was still claimed by Prince Christian's family.

The marriage, therefore, horrified King Christian IX of Denmark's daughter, Alexandra, Princess of Wales, who exclaimed: "The Duchies belong to Papa." Alexandra found support in her husband, his brother Prince Alfred, and his second sister, Princess Alice, who openly accused her mother of sacrificing Helena's happiness for the Queen's convenience. Alice also argued that it would reduce the already low popularity of her sister, the Crown Princess of Prussia, at the court in Berlin. However, and unexpectedly, the Crown Princess, who had been a personal friend of Christian's family for many years, ardently supported the proposed alliance.

Despite the political controversies and their age difference—he was fifteen years her senior—Helena was happy with Christian and was determined to marry him. As a younger son of a non-reigning duke, the absence of any foreign commitments allowed him to remain permanently in Britain—the Queen's primary concern—and she declared the marriage would go ahead. Helena and Christian were actually third cousins in descent from Frederick, Prince of Wales. Relations between Helena and Alexandra remained strained, and Alexandra was unprepared to accept Christian (who was also a third cousin to Alexandra in descent from King Frederick V of Denmark) as either a cousin or brother-in-law. The Queen never forgave the Princess of Wales for accusations of possessiveness, and wrote of the Waleses shortly afterwards: "Bertie is most affectionate and kind but Alix [pet name for Alexandra] is by no means what she ought to be. It will be long, if ever, before she regains my confidence."

=== Engagement and wedding ===
The engagement was declared on 5 December 1865, and despite the Prince of Wales's initial refusal to attend, Princess Alice intervened, and the wedding was a happy occasion. The Queen allowed the ceremony to take place at Windsor Castle, albeit in the Private Chapel rather than the grander St George's Chapel on 5 July 1866. The Queen relieved her black mourning dress with a white mourning cap which draped over her back. The main participants filed into the chapel to the sound of Beethoven's Triumphal March, creating a spectacle only marred by the abrupt disappearance of Prince George, Duke of Cambridge, who had a sudden gout attack. Christian filed into the chapel with his two supporters, Prince Edward of Saxe-Weimar and Prince Frederic of Schleswig-Holstein, and Helena was given away by her mother, who escorted her up the aisle with the Prince of Wales and eight bridesmaids. Christian looked older than he was, and one guest commented that Helena looked as if she was marrying an aged uncle. Indeed, when he was first summoned to Britain, he assumed that the widowed Queen was inspecting him as a new husband for herself rather than as a candidate for one of her daughters. The couple spent the first night of their married life at Osborne House, before honeymooning in Paris, Interlaken and Genoa.

=== Married life ===
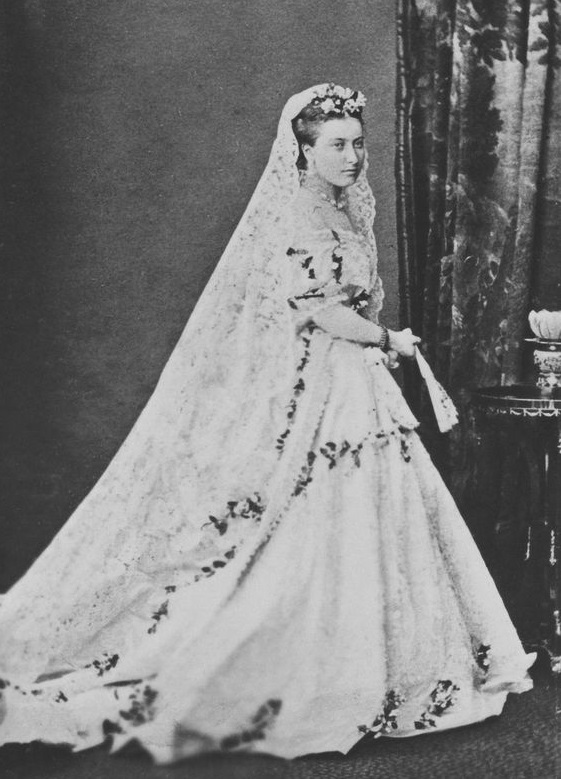
Princess Helena in her wedding dress, 5 July 1866

Helena and Christian were devoted to each other and led a quiet life in comparison to Helena's sisters. Following their marriage, they took up residence at Cumberland Lodge in Windsor Great Park, the traditional residence of the Ranger of Windsor Great Park, the honorary position bestowed on Christian by the Queen. When staying in London, they lived at the Belgian Suite in Buckingham Palace. The couple had six children: Christian Victor in 1867, Albert in 1869, and Helena Victoria and Marie Louise in 1870 and 1872, respectively. Their last two sons died early; Harald died eight days after his birth in 1876, and an unnamed son was stillborn in 1877. Helena's sister Princess Louise commissioned the French sculptor Jules Dalou to sculpt a memorial to Helena's dead infants.

The Christians were granted a parliamentary annuity of £6,000 a year by the Annuity, Princess Helena Act 1866 (29 & 30 Vict. c. 7), which the Queen requested in person. In addition, a dowry of £30,000 was settled upon, and the Queen gave the couple £100,000, which yielded an income of about £4,000 a year. As well as that of Ranger of Windsor Park, Christian was given the honorary position of High Steward of Windsor, and was made a member of the Royal Commission for the Exhibition of 1851. However, he was often an absentee figurehead at the meetings, instead passing his time playing with his dog Corrie, feeding his numerous pigeons, and embarking on hunting excursions.

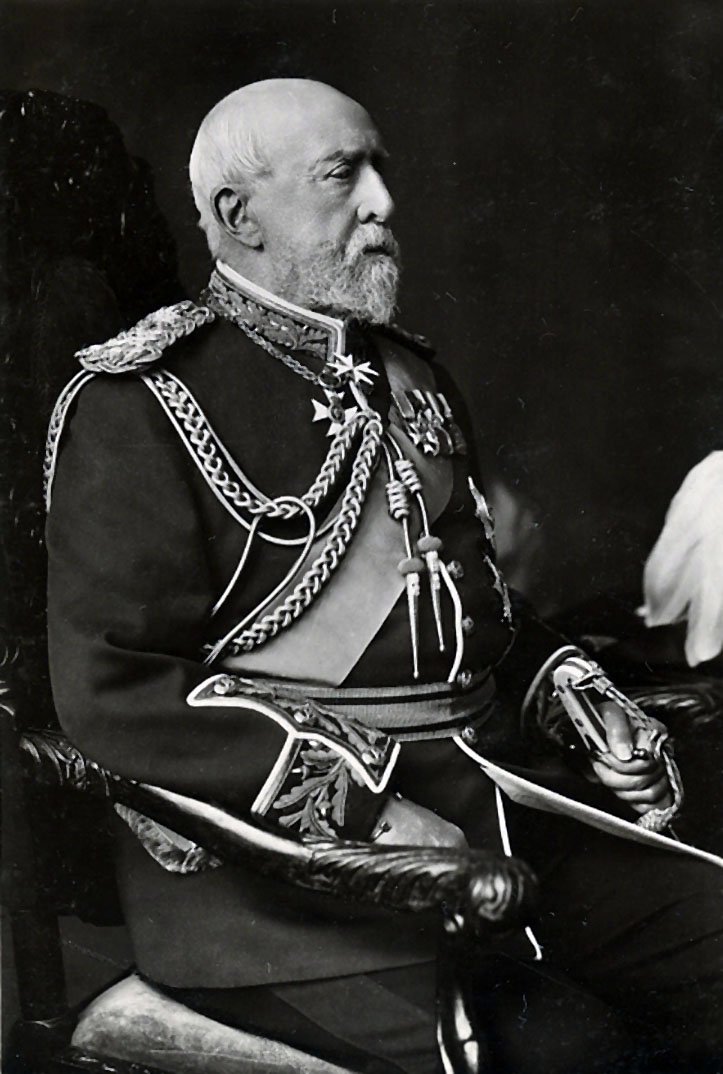
Prince Christian of Schleswig-Holstein, her husband

As promised, Helena lived close to the Queen, and both she and Beatrice performed duties for her. Beatrice, whom Victoria had groomed for the main role at her side, carried out the more important duties, and Helena took on the more minor matters that Beatrice did not have time to do.

Helena's health was not robust, and she was addicted to the drugs opium and laudanum. However, the Queen did not believe that Helena was really ill, accusing her of hypochondria encouraged by an indulgent husband. Queen Victoria wrote to her daughter the Crown Princess of Prussia, complaining that Helena was inclined to "coddle herself (and Christian too) and to give way in everything that the great object of her doctors and nurse is to rouse her and make her think less of herself and of her confinement". Not all of her health scares were simply the result of hypochondria; in 1869, she had to cancel her trip to Balmoral Castle when she became ill at the railway station. In 1870, she was suffering from severe rheumatism and problems with her joints. In July 1871, she suffered from congestion in her lungs, an illness severe enough to appear in the Court Circular, which announced that her illness caused "much anxiety to members of the royal family". In 1873, she was forced to recuperate in France as a result of illness, and in the 1880s she travelled to Germany to see an oculist.

== Activities ==
=== Nursing ===
Helena had a firm interest in nursing, and was the founding chair of the Ladies' Committee of the British Red Cross in 1870, playing an active role in recruiting nurses and organising relief supplies during the Franco-Prussian War. She subsequently became President of the British Nurses' Association (RBNA) upon its foundation in 1887. In 1891, it received the prefix "Royal", and received a royal charter the following year. She was a strong supporter of nurse registration, an issue that was opposed by both Florence Nightingale and leading public figures. In a speech Helena made in 1893, she made clear that the RBNA was working towards "improving the education and status of those devoted and self-sacrificing women whose whole lives have been devoted to tending the sick, the suffering, and the dying". In the same speech, she warned about opposition and misrepresentation they had encountered. Although the RBNA was in favour of registration as a means of enhancing and guaranteeing the professional status of trained nurses, its incorporation with the Privy Council allowed it to maintain a list rather than a formal register of nurses.

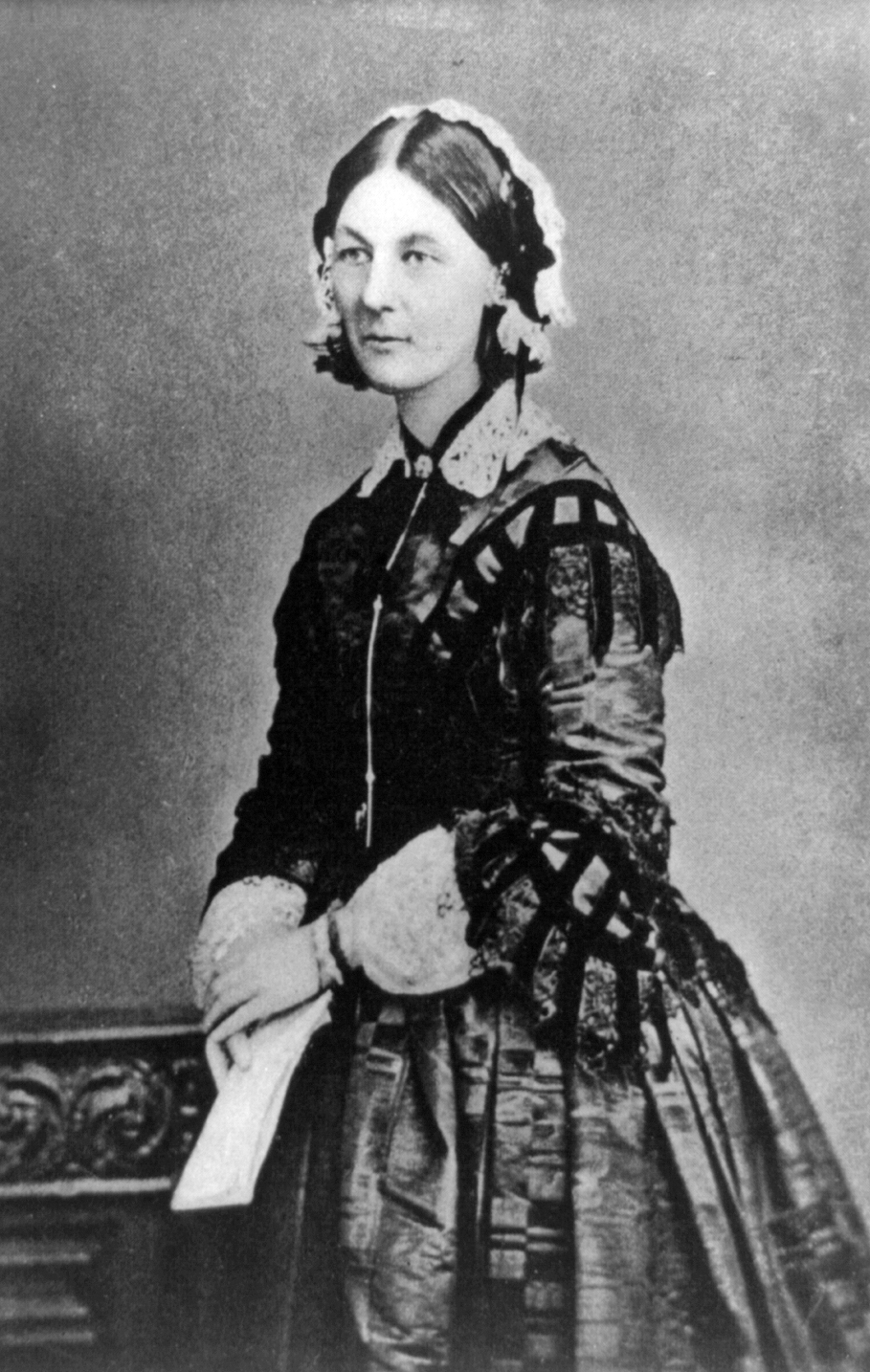
Florence Nightingale, against whom Helena promoted nurse registration

Following the death of Queen Victoria in 1901, the new queen, Alexandra, insisted on replacing Helena as President of the Army Nursing Service. This gave rise to a further breach between the royal ladies, with King Edward VII caught in the middle between his sister and his wife. Lady Roberts, a courtier, wrote to a friend: "matters were sometimes very difficult and not always pleasant." However, in accordance with rank, Helena agreed to resign in Alexandra's favour, and she retained presidency of the Army Nursing Reserve. Though thought to be merely an artefact created by society ladies, Helena exercised an efficient and autocratic regime—"if anyone ventures to disagree with Her Royal Highness she has simply said, 'It is my wish, that is sufficient.'"

The RBNA gradually went into decline following the Nurses Registration Act 1919; after six failed attempts between 1904 and 1918, the British parliament passed the bill allowing formal nurse registration. What resulted was the Royal College of Nursing (RCN), and the RBNA lost membership and dominance. Helena supported the proposed amalgamation of the RBNA with the new RCN, but that proved unsuccessful when the RBNA pulled out of the negotiations. However, she remained active in other nursing organisations, and was president of the Isle of Wight, Windsor and Great Western Railway branches of the Order of St. John. In this position, she personally signed and presented many thousands of certificates of proficiency in nursing.

=== Needlework ===
Helena was also active in the promotion of needlework, and became the first president of the newly established School of Art Needlework in 1872; in 1876, it acquired the "royal" prefix, becoming the Royal School of Needlework. In Helena's words, the objective of the school was: "first, to revive a beautiful art which had been well-nigh lost; and secondly, through its revival, to provide employment for gentlewomen who were without means of a suitable livelihood." As with her other organisations, she was an active president, and worked to keep the school on an even level with other schools. She personally wrote to Royal Commissioners requesting money; for example, in 1895, she requested and acquired £30,000 for erecting a building for the school in South Kensington. Her royal status helped its promotion, and she held Thursday afternoon tea parties at the school for society ladies, who wanted to be seen in the presence of royal personages such as Helena. When the Christmas Bazaar was held, she acted as chief saleswoman, generating long queues of people anxious to be served personally by her.

Helena was anxious to help children and the unemployed, and began hosting free dinners for their benefit at the Windsor Guildhall. She presided over two of these dinners, in February and March 1886, and over 3,000 meals were served to children and unemployed men during the harsh winter that year. Through her charitable activities, she became popular with the people; a contemporary author, C. W. Cooper, wrote that "the poor of Windsor worshipped her".

== Writing ==
Among Helena's other interests was writing, especially translation. In 1867, when the first biography of her father, the Prince Consort was written, the author, Sir Charles Grey, notes that the Prince's letters were translated (from German to English) by Helena "with surprising fidelity". Other translations followed, and in 1887 she published a translation of The Memoirs of Wilhelmine, Margravine of Bayreuth. It was noted by the Saturday Review that Helena wrote an English version that was thoroughly alive, with a sound dictionary translation and a high accuracy in spirit. Her final translation was undertaken in 1882, on a German booklet called First Aid to the Injured, originally published by Christian's brother-in-law. It was republished several times until 1906.

=== Bergsträsser affair ===
A copyright issue arose after the publication of letters written by Helena's sister, Princess Alice. In Germany, an edition of Alice's letters was published in 1883, by a Darmstadt clergyman called Carl Sell, who chose a selection of her letters made available to him by the Queen. When it was done, Helena wrote to Sell and requested permission to publish an English translation of the German text. It was granted, but without the knowledge of the publisher Dr Bergsträsser. In December 1883 Helena wrote to Sir Theodore Martin, a favoured royal biographer, informing him that Bergsträsser was claiming copyright of Alice's letters, and on that basis was demanding a delay in the publication of the English edition. Martin acted as an intermediary between Helena and Bergsträsser, who claimed to have received many offers from English publishers, and that the chosen one would expect a high honorarium.

Bergsträsser was persuaded to drop his demand for a delay in publishing, and modify his copyright claims in return for a lump sum. However, the Queen and Helena refused, claiming that the copyright belonged to the Queen, and that only Sell's original preface was open to negotiation. The royal ladies considered Bergsträsser's claims "unjustified if not impertinent", and would not communicate with him directly. Eventually, Bergsträsser came to Britain in January 1884, willing to accept £100 for the first 3,000 copies and a further £40 for each subsequent thousand copies sold. Martin chose the publisher John Murray, who after further negotiations with Bergsträsser, printed the first copies in mid-1884. It sold out almost immediately; but for the second edition, Murray replaced Sell's biographical sketch of Princess Alice with the 53-page memoir written by Helena. The problem of royalties to Sell was thus avoided, and that Helena gave her name to the memoir to her sister attracted greater interest in the book.

== After Queen Victoria ==
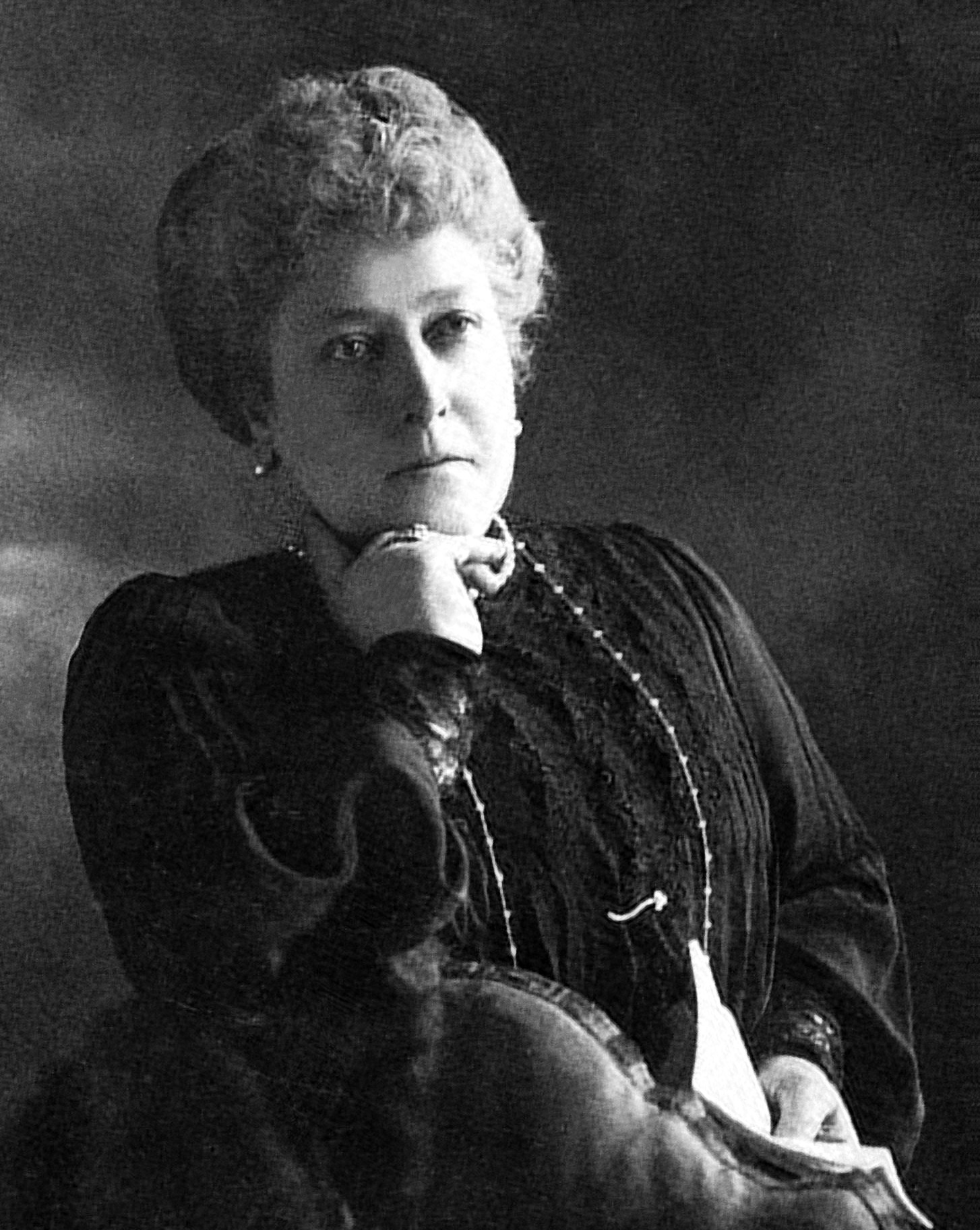
Princess Helena of the United Kingdom, ca. 1910

=== Edwardian period ===
Helena's favourite son, Prince Christian Victor, died in 1900, followed three months later by her mother Queen Victoria, who died at Osborne House on 22 January 1901. The new King, Edward VII, did not have close ties with his surviving sisters, with the exception of Princess Louise. Helena's nephew, Prince Alexander of Battenberg (later Marquess of Carisbrooke) recorded that Queen Alexandra was jealous of the royal family, and would not invite her sisters-in-law to Sandringham. Moreover, Alexandra never fully reconciled herself to Helena and Christian following their marriage controversy in the 1860s.

Helena saw relatively little of her surviving siblings, and continued her role as a support to the monarchy and a campaigner for the many charities she represented. She and Christian led a quiet life, but did carry out a few royal engagements. On one such occasion, the elderly couple represented the King at the silver wedding anniversary, in 1906, of Kaiser Wilhelm II (Helena's nephew) and his wife Augusta Victoria (Christian's niece). During the Edwardian period, Helena visited the grave of her son, Prince Christian Victor, who died in 1900 following a bout with malaria while serving in the Second Boer War. She was met by South African Prime Minister Louis Botha, but Jan Smuts refused to meet her, partly because he was bitter that South Africa had lost the war and partly because his son had died in a British concentration camp. In 1902, Prince and Princess Christian moved to De Vesci House (No. 77–78) Pall Mall, London, which was known as Schomberg House during the time when Princess Helena occupied the house as her London residence.

Before the First World War, she was one of the few maternal relatives that her nephew Kaiser Wilhelm II was close to. When he welcomed his first child, he went against Prussian tradition by asking Helena, not his mother, to assign a nurse for his son, causing a family scandal.

=== Later years ===
King Edward died in 1910, and the First World War began four years after his death. Helena devoted her time to nursing, and her daughter, Princess Marie Louise, recorded in her memoirs that requests for news of loved ones reached Helena and her sisters. It was decided that the letters should be forwarded to Crown Princess Margaret of Sweden, Helena's niece, as Sweden was neutral during the war. It was during the war that Helena and Christian celebrated their golden wedding anniversary in 1916, and despite the fact that Britain and Germany were at war, the Kaiser sent a congratulatory telegram to his aunt and uncle through the Crown Princess of Sweden. King George V and Queen Mary were present when the telegram was received, and the King remarked to Helena's daughter, Marie Louise, that her former husband, Prince Aribert of Anhalt, did her a service when he turned her out. When Marie Louise said she would have run away to Britain if she was still married, the King said, "with a twinkle in his eye", that he would have had to intern her.

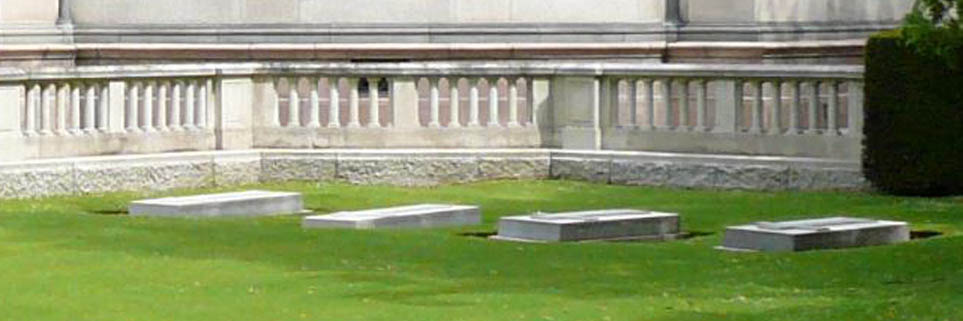
Princess Helena's grave at Frogmore (second from left) in the Schleswig-Holstein burial plot

In 1917, in response to the wave of anti-German feeling that surrounded the war, George V changed the family name from Saxe-Coburg and Gotha to Windsor. He also disposed of his family's German titles and styles, so Helena and her daughters simply became Princess Christian, Princess Helena Victoria and Princess Marie Louise with no territorial designation. Helena's surviving son, Albert, fought on the side of the Prussians, though he made it clear that he would not fight against his mother's country. In the same year, on 28 October, Prince Christian died at Schomberg House. Helena's last years were spent arguing with Commissioners, who tried to turn her out of Schomberg House and Cumberland Lodge because of the expense of running her households. They failed, as clear evidence of her right to live in those residences for life was shown. One of Princess Christian's final public appearances was at the wedding of Prince Albert and Lady Elizabeth Bowes-Lyon in April 1923.

=== Death ===
Helena died at Schomberg House on 9 June 1923 at 9:10 am, aged 77, following a heart attack after a bout of influenza. Her funeral, described as a "magnificently stage-managed scene" by her biographer Seweryn Chomet, was headed by King George V. The regiment of her favourite son, Prince Christian Victor, lined the steps of St. George's Chapel at Windsor Castle. Although originally interred in the Royal Vault at St George's on 15 June, her body was reburied at the Royal Burial Ground, Frogmore, a few miles from Windsor, after its consecration on 23 October 1928.

== Legacy ==
Helena was devoted to nursing, and took the lead at the charitable organisations she represented. She was also an active campaigner, and wrote letters to newspapers and magazines promoting the interests of nurse registration. Her royal status helped to promote the publicity and society interest that surrounded organisations such as the Royal British Nurses' Association. The RBNA still survives today with Aubrey Rose as president. Emily Williamson founded the Gentlewomen's Employment Association in Manchester; one of the projects which came out of this group was the Princess Christian Training College for Nurses, in Fallowfield, Manchester.

In appearance, Helena was described by John Van der Kiste as plump and dowdy; and in temperament, as placid, and business-like, with an authoritarian spirit. On one occasion, during a National Dock Strike, the Archbishop of Canterbury composed a prayer hoping for its prompt end. Helena arrived at the church, examined her service sheet, and in a voice described by her daughter as "the penetrating royal family whisper, which carried farther than any megaphone", remarked: "That prayer won't settle any strike." Her appearance and personality was criticised in the letters and journals of Queen Victoria, and biographers followed her example. However, Helena's daughter, Princess Marie Louise, described her as:

very lovely, with wavy brown hair, a beautiful little straight nose, and lovely amber-coloured eyes ... She was very talented: played the piano exquisitively, had a distinct gift for drawing and painting in water-colours ... Her outstanding gift was loyalty to her friends ... She was brilliantly clever, had a wonderful head for business. ...

Music was one of her passions; in her youth she played the piano with Charles Hallé, Jenny Lind and Clara Butt, who were among her personal friends, and she was amongst the first members of the Bach Choir of London, founded by Lind's husband (and Helena's former piano teacher) Otto Goldschmidt. Her determination to carry out a wide range of public duties won her widespread popularity. She twice represented her mother at Drawing Rooms, attendance at which was considered equivalent to being presented to the queen herself.

Helena was closest to her brother, Prince Alfred, who considered her his favourite sister. Though described by contemporaries as fearfully devoted to the Queen Victoria, to the point that she did not have a mind of her own, she actively campaigned for women's rights, a field the queen abhorred. Nevertheless, both she and Beatrice remained closest to the queen, and Helena remained close to her mother's side until the latter's death. Her name was the last to be written in the queen's seventy-year-old journal.

== Titles, styles, honours and arms ==
=== Titles and styles ===
- 25 May 1846 – 5 July 1866: Her Royal Highness The Princess Helena
- 5 July 1866 – 17 July 1917: Her Royal Highness The Princess Helena, Princess Christian of Schleswig-Holstein
- 17 July 1917 – 9 June 1923: Her Royal Highness Princess Christian

=== Honours ===
British

- 1 January 1878: Companion of the Crown of India
- 29 April 1883: Member of the Royal Red Cross
- 23 March 1896: Lady of Justice of St John
- 10 February 1904: Royal Family Order of King Edward VII
- 3 June 1911: Royal Family Order of King George V
- 3 June 1918: Dame Grand Cross of the British Empire.
- Member 1st class of the Royal Order of Victoria and Albert

Foreign

- (Kingdom of Portugal) 31 March 1863: Dame of the Order of Queen Saint Isabel
- Dame of the Order of Louise, 1st Division
- 1 June 1872: Cross of Merit for Women and Girls

=== Arms ===
In 1858, Helena and her three youngest sisters were granted use of the royal arms, with an inescutcheon of the shield of Saxony, and differenced by a label of three points argent. On Helena's arms, the outer points bore roses gules, and the centre bore a cross gules. In 1917, the inescutcheon was dropped by royal warrant from George V.

Princess Helena's coat of arms (1858–1917)

== Issue ==
Prince and Princess Christian had six children, four of whom lived to adulthood. They had one grandchild, Valerie Marie zu Schleswig-Holstein, who died in 1953 as their final descendant.

Name	Birth	Death	Notes
Prince Christian Victor	14 April 1867	29 October 1900	His mother's favourite son; died unmarried and without issue while serving in the Boer War
Prince Albert	26 February 1869	27 April 1931	Succeeded as head of the House of Oldenburg in 1921; had one illegitimate daughter, Valerie Marie zu Schleswig-Holstein, later Duchess of Aarschot and Arenberg as wife of Prince Engelbert-Charles of Arenberg, 16th Duke of Aarschot and 10th Duke of Arenberg (Head of the formerly Sovereign House of Arenberg)
Princess Helena Victoria	3 May 1870	13 March 1948	Never married. One of her last public appearances was at the wedding of the future Queen Elizabeth II and Prince Philip, Duke of Edinburgh
Princess Marie Louise	12 August 1872	8 December 1956	Married 1891; Prince Aribert of Anhalt; no issue; marriage was dissolved in 1900
Prince Harald	12 May 1876	20 May 1876	Died an infant at eight days old
An unnamed stillborn son	7 May 1877	7 May 1877	Stillborn

== Ancestry ==
Ancestors of Princess Helena of the United Kingdom

8. Francis, Duke of Saxe-Coburg-Saalfeld
4. Ernest I, Duke of Saxe-Coburg and Gotha
9. Countess Augusta of Reuss-Ebersdorf
2. Prince Albert of Saxe-Coburg and Gotha
10. Augustus, Duke of Saxe-Gotha-Altenburg
5. Princess Louise of Saxe-Gotha-Altenburg
11. Duchess Louise Charlotte of Mecklenburg-Schwerin
1. Princess Helena of the United Kingdom
12. George III of the United Kingdom
6. Prince Edward, Duke of Kent and Strathearn
13. Charlotte of Mecklenburg-Strelitz
3. Victoria of the United Kingdom
14. Francis, Duke of Saxe-Coburg-Saalfeld (= 8)
7. Princess Victoria of Saxe-Coburg-Saalfeld
15. Countess Augusta of Reuss-Ebersdorf (= 9)
