= Royal School of Needlework =

Embroidery school in Hampton Court Palace

Coordinates: 51.403°N 0.338°W

- Established: 1872
- Academic affiliations: UCA
- Chief Executive: Rhian Harris
- Location: Hampton Court Palace; Richmond upon Thames, London
- Patron: Queen Camilla
- Website: www.royal-needlework.org.uk

The Royal School of Needlework (RSN) is a hand embroidery school in the United Kingdom, founded in 1872 and based at Hampton Court Palace since 1987.

== History ==
The RSN began as the School of Art Needlework in 1872, founded by Lady Victoria Welby. The first president was Princess Christian of Schleswig-Holstein, Queen Victoria's third daughter, known to the RSN as Princess Helena. She received help from William Morris and many of his friends in the Arts and Crafts movement.

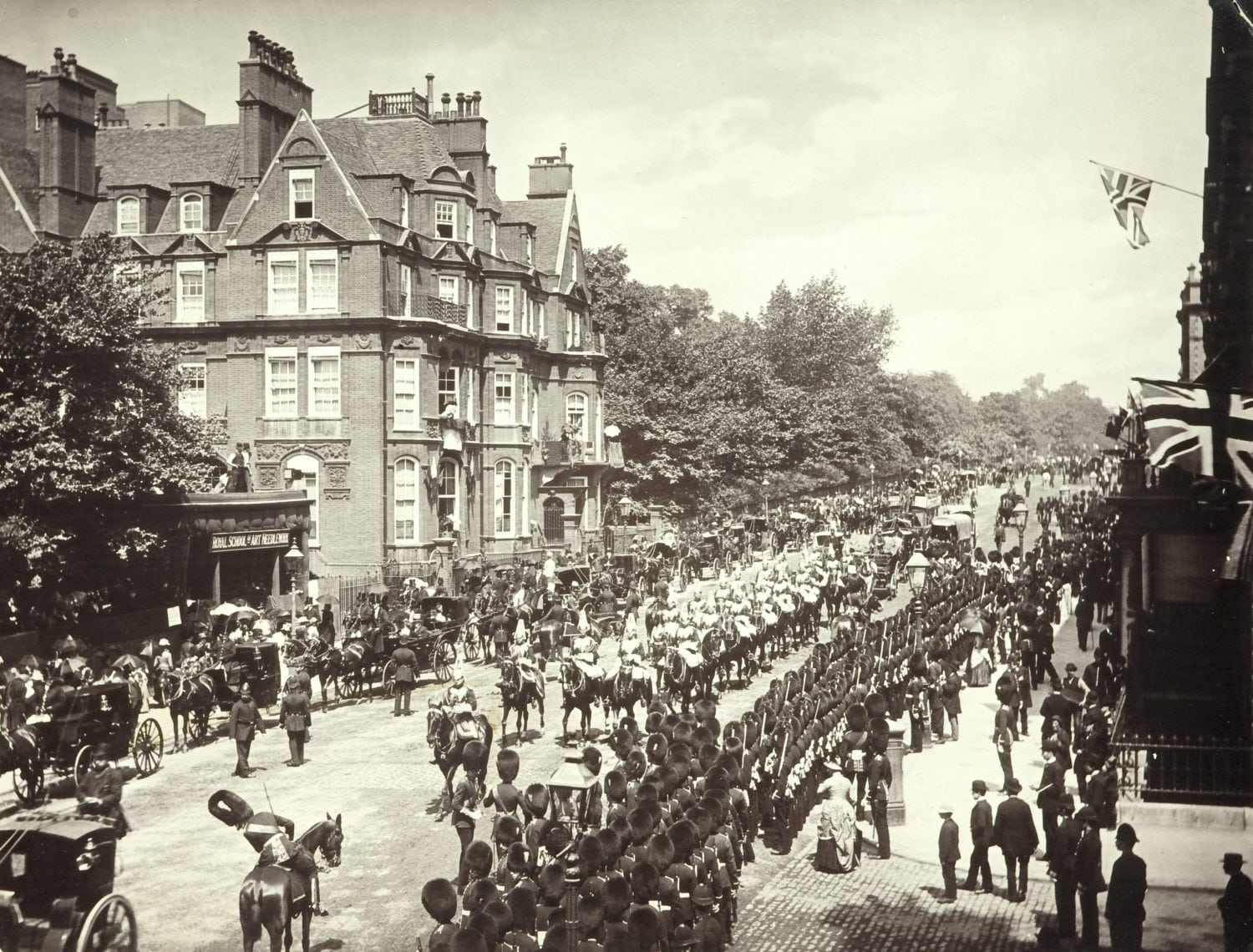
Their new building on Exhibition Road was opened in 1875 by Princess Helena

Its initial premises was a small apartment on Sloane Street, employing 20 women. She employed Anastasia Marie Dolby as the superintendent and instructor but she died in the following year. Nellie Whichelo was the head designer from the late 1880s. The School received its royal prefix in March 1875 when Queen Victoria consented to become its first patron. It was also an inspiration to Dora Wemyss, who founded the Wemyss School of Needlework in Scotland in 1877 in its image. The school grew to 150 students and moved in 1903 to Exhibition Road, near the Victoria and Albert Museum. The purpose-built building was designed by a group of architects, including prominent British Arts and Crafts architect James Leonard Williams (d.1926). The word "Art" was dropped from the school's title in 1922.

The RSN established a Studio which works new bespoke embroidery commissions and replicas of antique textiles as well as restoration and conservation projects. The work of the Studio has been used in many important events, including a joint effort with Toye in producing the velvet cushions on which the Royal Crowns were carried into Westminster Abbey for the Coronation of King George VI.

In 1953, the school created the gold embroidery on the Purple Robe of Estate, part of the coronation robes of Queen Elizabeth II.

The school moved from Princes Gate in Kensington to Hampton Court Palace in 1987, occupying rooms in Christopher Wren's construction.

In 2011, the school was responsible for hand appliquéing machine-made floral lace motifs onto silk net (tulle) for the wedding dress of Catherine Middleton, now Her Royal Highness The Princess of Wales.

In 2022, the school celebrated its 150-year anniversary with the 150 Years of the Royal School of Needlework: Crown to Catwalk exhibition at the Fashion and Textile Museum of London. The exhibition explored the history of RSN, some of the school's work, mostly over the twentieth century, along with exploring RSN's role in contemporary times. The exhibition also displayed work from teachers and students that "highlighted the versatility of embroidery and how historical techniques can be adapted to modern art pieces".

The RSN embroidered 9 pieces for the 2023 Coronation, including the King's Robe of State and the Queen's Robe of Estate.

== Alumni include ==
- Beryl Dean, English embroiderer
- Louisa Pesel

== Publications ==
To make arts and crafts more accessible to a wider audience, in 1880 the school published the Handbook of Embroidery. It was written by Letitia Higgin and edited by the school's vice-President. It included commissioned illustrations by Gertrude Jekyll, William Morris, Edward Burne-Jones and Walter Crane. Over a century later, in 2011, the school reprinted the work with a preface essay by Lynn Hulse.

William George Paulson Townsend, who taught drawing and became master of design at the school, also published several works including Embroidery, or, The craft of the needle and Plant and floral studies for designers, art students, and craftsmen, the latter of which was reprinted in 2005.

== Collections ==
The RSN has an archive of over 30,000 embroidery-related images covering every period of British history. There are also over 5,000 textile pieces in its Collection.

For its 150th anniversary in 2021, the Royal School of Needlework opened the RSN Stitch Bank, a digital archive with detailed information about selected stitches, their history and usage.

== Governance ==
The Royal School of Needlework is a registered charity and has always been under royal patronage. The current patron is The Queen. The previous patron was Queen Elizabeth II. The school is governed by a board of trustees currently chaired by Pip Wood. Rhian Harris is chief executive. Standards are overseen by QAA who, in 2014, commended the quality of student learning opportunities at the school.

== Allegations of bullying ==
A former student made accusations that management at the Royal School of Needlework had failed to properly investigate allegations of bullying made by her and another student against a tutor on the Future Tutor Programme. According to a newspaper article, a prior complaint against the tutor had been upheld and the tutor reprimanded. Nevertheless, the tutor was later allowed to teach the same student who had made the complaint, whereupon, she alleges, the pattern of bullying behaviour was repeated. Dr Kay-Williams, then Chief Executive of The Royal School of Needlework, denied failing to investigate, and said that it "is the role of the tutor to develop and challenge the students", and claimed that the consensus of the staff who had worked with the student was that she "lacked the required focus and commitment for the course".

== Current facilities ==
The RSN runs leisure classes from one to five days starting with classes for beginners and leading on to more complex and varied techniques as embroiderers become more experienced. There is a certificate and diploma in technical hand embroidery for those who want to develop practical embroidery skills to a high level; also a unique degree in hand embroidery which encompasses some technical training, with the emphasis on contemporary practice, alongside academic studies. The degree course in hand embroidery is accredited by the University for the Creative Arts. In 2012 the RSN introduced a new three-year Tutors’ Course which combines high-level technical embroidery training with teaching practice and business skills required to work as a freelance embroiderer/tutor.

In 2018, RSN launched self-paced online courses. These courses include video tutorials, a materials kit, and access to a student Facebook group. In 2020, RSN launched online day and evening classes, online private lessons, online certificate and diploma tuition and online talks.

== See also ==
- Mary Ann Beinecke Decorative Art Collection
- Hastings Embroidery
