= 2025 Næstved municipal election =

Municipal election in Denmark

- 18 November 2025

All 31 seats to the Næstved municipal council 16 seats needed for a majority
- Turnout: 47,142 (68.6%) ▲3.0%
	First party	Second party	Third party
	A	V	C
Party	Social Democrats	Venstre	Conservatives
Last election	13 seats, 39.3%	6 seats, 18.0%	5 seats, 15.4%
Seats won	10	5	4
Seat change	▼3	▼1	▼1
Popular vote	14,428	7,124	6,017
Percentage	31.1%	15.4%	13.0%
Swing	▼8.2%	▼2.7%	▼2.4%
	Fourth party	Fifth party	Sixth party
	I	O	F
Party	Liberal Alliance	Danish People's Party	Green Left
Last election	0 seats, 1.3%	1 seat, 4.0%	1 seat, 5.1%
Seats won	3	3	2
Seat change	▲3	▲2	▲1
Popular vote	4,737	3,940	3,186
Percentage	10.2%	8.5%	6.9%
Swing	▲8.9%	▲4.5%	▲1.8%
	Seventh party	Eighth party	Ninth party
	B	Ø	Æ
Party	Social Liberals	Red-Green Alliance	Denmark Democrats
Last election	2 seats, 5.6%	1 seat, 3.9%	Did not stand
Seats won	2	1	1
Seat change	0	0	▲1
Popular vote	2,727	2,028	1,312
Percentage	5.9%	4.4%	2.8%
Swing	▲0.3%	▲0.5%	New
Mayor before election
Carsten Rasmussne
Social Democrats
Mayor after election
Kenneth Sørensen
Venstre

The 2025 Næstved Municipal election was held on November 18, 2025, to elect the 31 members to sit in the regional council for the Næstved Municipal council, in the period of 2026 to 2029. Kenneth Sørensen from Venstre, would win the mayoral position.

== Background ==
Following the 2021 election, Carsten Rasmussen from Social Democrats became mayor for a third term. He would run for a fourth term.

== Electoral system ==
For elections to Danish municipalities, a number varying from 9 to 31 are chosen to be elected to the municipal council. The seats are then allocated using the D'Hondt method and a closed list proportional representation. Næstved Municipality had 31 seats in 2025.

== Electoral alliances ==
=== Electoral Alliance 1 ===
Party		Political alignment
A	Social Democrats	Centre-left
B	Social Liberals	Centre to Centre-left
F	Green Left	Centre-left to Left-wing
Ø	Red-Green Alliance	Left-wing to Far-Left
Å	The Alternative	Centre-left to Left-wing

=== Electoral Alliance 2 ===
Party		Political alignment
C	Conservatives	Centre-right
I	Liberal Alliance	Centre-right to Right-wing
M	Moderates	Centre to Centre-right
O	Danish People's Party	Right-wing to Far-right
V	Venstre	Centre-right
Æ	Denmark Democrats	Right-wing to Far-right

== Results by polling station ==
Division	A	B	C	F	I	M	O	V	Æ	Ø	Å
Division	%	%	%	%	%	%	%	%	%	%	%
Fuglebjerg	25.6	8.3	10.8	7.3	7.1	0.7	13.8	15.0	5.4	4.6	1.4
Everdrup	33.5	4.6	7.9	5.8	10.6	0.9	10.6	15.5	6.2	3.3	1.2
Grønbro Hallen	23.6	4.7	13.3	5.8	6.5	0.6	9.7	27.4	4.6	3.2	0.5
Fladså Hallen	31.4	4.1	16.7	7.3	10.5	0.6	6.7	17.0	2.5	2.5	0.7
Tybjerg	24.0	4.1	11.8	5.8	10.9	1.3	12.6	18.6	6.2	3.9	0.8
Tappernøje	37.6	2.0	9.3	5.9	9.2	0.8	11.3	14.4	5.6	3.3	0.7
Hammer - Vester Egesborg	27.1	3.0	10.3	6.2	11.0	1.6	12.4	15.4	6.8	4.8	1.3
Fensmark	33.3	3.1	14.2	6.2	7.8	0.6	11.1	16.9	2.8	3.3	0.6
Holme-Olstrup	20.8	3.3	19.5	4.6	7.4	0.9	9.5	29.5	2.5	2.0	0.3
Toksværd	19.4	3.5	7.4	4.6	10.2	0.3	7.7	38.8	3.6	4.0	0.6
Glumsø	35.8	5.8	10.8	8.5	8.8	0.9	9.5	9.3	3.7	5.8	1.2
Sandby Forsamlingshus	19.2	8.6	14.7	7.5	8.6	1.0	16.8	9.6	10.6	3.1	0.3
Skelby	22.6	4.3	13.6	7.9	12.5	1.1	14.1	10.9	4.3	6.3	2.4
Herlufmagle	30.4	3.7	13.9	6.3	8.9	0.8	13.8	12.2	4.5	4.6	0.9
Lille Næstved Skole - Digtervej	31.4	8.3	15.7	6.3	10.4	1.4	6.1	13.0	2.3	4.6	0.5
Grønnegades Kaserne	30.8	7.1	12.6	7.9	13.2	1.0	6.1	14.8	1.2	4.5	0.8
Næstved Firma Sport	33.2	7.5	10.3	8.5	11.4	0.8	7.5	11.8	1.8	6.0	1.4
Arena Næstved	33.8	7.3	12.3	7.7	10.5	1.3	6.7	13.3	1.9	4.5	0.7
Lille Næstved Skole - Herlufsholmvej	27.1	9.5	18.1	5.9	13.0	1.3	3.6	15.5	0.8	4.5	0.7
Herlufsholmhallen	33.7	4.7	14.7	5.0	11.1	1.2	6.0	18.3	1.9	2.8	0.7
Kobberbakkeskolen - Sydby	36.6	4.9	11.6	6.5	8.7	0.8	9.3	13.0	1.8	6.0	0.7
Kobberbakkeskolen - Rønnebæk	29.3	7.5	13.7	6.1	11.9	0.5	9.6	12.1	3.5	4.9	0.7
Hyllinge	22.7	4.1	10.5	7.9	12.3	0.9	14.1	17.5	5.2	3.5	1.4
Lille Næstved Skole - Karrebæk	29.8	3.9	15.6	7.9	10.7	1.3	7.6	16.1	2.3	4.7	0.2

== Results ==
Party		Votes	%	+/-	Seats	+/-
Næstved Municipality
A	Social Democrats	14,428	31.13	-8.19	10	-3
V	Venstre	7,124	15.37	-2.66	5	-1
C	Conservatives	6,017	12.98	-2.43	4	-1
I	Liberal Alliance	4,737	10.22	+8.91	3	+3
O	Danish People's Party	3,940	8.50	+4.54	3	+2
F	Green Left	3,186	6.87	+1.82	2	+1
B	Social Liberals	2,727	5.88	+0.29	2	0
Ø	Red-Green Alliance	2,028	4.38	+0.48	1	0
Æ	Denmark Democrats	1,312	2.83	New	1	New
M	Moderates	461	0.99	New	0	New
Å	The Alternative	382	0.82	+0.57	0	0
Total		46,342	100	N/A	31	N/A
Invalid votes		146	0.21	-0.10		
Blank votes		654	0.95	0.0		
Turnout		47,142	68.60	+2.98		
Source: valg.dk

== Opinion polls ==
Polling firm	Fieldwork date	Sample size	A	V	C	B	F	O	Ø	I	Å	M	Æ	Lead
Epinion	4 Sep - 13 Oct 2025	508	38.5	16.5	5.4	1.1	9.1	7.0	4.8	7.7	0.9	1.5	7.2	22.0
2024 european parliament election	9 Jun 2024		19.3	14.1	8.5	4.4	15.3	9.3	4.7	7.0	2.0	7.2	8.2	4.0
2022 general election	1 Nov 2022		32.8	10.9	5.3	2.1	8.6	4.2	2.9	7.0	1.6	10.7	8.2	21.9
2021 regional election	16 Nov 2021		37.6	19.0	14.3	3.4	5.6	5.0	4.9	1.7	0.3	–	–	18.6
2021 municipal election	16 Nov 2021		39.3 (13)	18.0 (6)	15.4 (5)	5.6 (2)	5.1 (1)	4.0 (1)	3.9 (1)	1.3 (0)	0.3 (0)	–	–	21.3
