= 2021 Næstved municipal election =

← 2017	16 November 2021	2025 →

All 31 seats to the Næstved Municipal Council 16 seats needed for a majority
- Turnout: 44,132 (65.6%) ▼5.6pp
	First party	Second party	Third party
	A	V	C
Party	Social Democrats	Venstre	Conservatives
Last election	13 seats, 39.4%	9 seats, 24.6%	2 seats, 6.3%
Seats won	13	6	5
Seat change	0	▼3	▲3
Popular vote	17,006	7,800	6,665
Percentage	39.3%	18.0%	15.4%
Swing	▼0.1%	▼6.6%	▲9.1%
	Fourth party	Fifth party	Sixth party
	D	B	F
Party	New Right	Social Liberals	Green Left
Last election	0 seats, 1.3%	2 seats, 6.7%	1 seat, 3.8%
Seats won	2	2	1
Seat change	▲2	0	0
Popular vote	2,938	2,421	2,185
Percentage	6.8%	5.6%	5.0%
Swing	▲5.5%	▼1.1%	▲1.2%
	Seventh party	Eighth party
	O	Ø
Party	Danish People's Party	Red–Green Alliance
Last election	2 seats, 9.1%	2 seats, 4.7%
Seats won	1	1
Seat change	▼1	▼1
Popular vote	1,712	1,684
Percentage	4.0%	3.9%
Swing	▼5.1%	▼0.8%
Mayor before election
Carsten Rasmussen
Social Democrats
Mayor after election
Carsten Rasmussen
Social Democrats

The Social Democrats have always had a large strength in Næstved Municipality. In all the general and municipal elections since the 2007 municipal reform, they had become the largest party and held the mayor's position in the municipality. A change of the party holding the mayor's position was also not expected for this election.

In the election result, the Social Democrats would once again become the largest party, and would keep the 13 seats they won in 2017. The red bloc parties won 17 of the 31 seats, which made it likely that Carsten Rasmussen would win a third term. This would mean that the party could celebrate 106 years of rule in 2025. (Note: The municipality was altered and enlarged in the 2007 municipal reform). It was eventually confirmed that a third term had been secured.

== Electoral system ==
For elections to Danish municipalities, a number varying from 9 to 31 are chosen to be elected to the municipal council. The seats are then allocated using the D'Hondt method and a closed list proportional representation. Næstved Municipality had 31 seats in 2021

Unlike in Danish General Elections, in elections to municipal councils, electoral alliances are allowed.

== Electoral alliances ==
=== Electoral Alliance 1 ===
Party		Political alignment
B	Social Liberals	Centre to Centre-left
F	Green Left	Centre-left to Left-wing
G	Vegan Party	Single-issue
Ø	Red–Green Alliance	Left-wing to Far-Left
Å	The Alternative	Centre-left to Left-wing

=== Electoral Alliance 2 ===
Party		Political alignment
O	Danish People's Party	Right-wing to Far-right
V	Venstre	Centre-right

=== Electoral Alliance 3 ===
Party		Political alignment
C	Conservatives	Centre-right
D	New Right	Right-wing to Far-right
I	Liberal Alliance	Centre-right to Right-wing

== Results by polling station ==
U = Udenfor

Division	A	B	C	D	F	G	I	O	U	V	Ø	Å
Division	%	%	%	%	%	%	%	%	%	%	%	%
Fuglebjerg	35.9	3.2	11.9	7.9	6.3	0.0	0.6	5.7	0.3	22.8	5.0	0.3
Everdrup	40.1	2.9	13.4	7.2	2.4	0.4	2.4	4.7	0.0	21.9	4.3	0.4
Grønbro Hallen	31.8	3.3	10.9	9.4	4.7	0.1	1.3	7.1	0.1	26.7	4.4	0.1
Fladså Hallen	34.8	4.1	18.9	7.0	4.0	0.3	1.1	3.3	0.0	23.8	2.4	0.2
Fensmark	43.4	3.4	15.9	7.9	4.6	0.3	1.0	4.2	0.0	16.6	2.6	0.1
Hammer - Vester Egesborg	36.7	4.5	13.7	11.5	2.8	0.4	1.2	5.1	0.0	18.2	5.3	0.5
Tappernøje	45.1	2.5	12.2	8.6	2.9	0.1	1.3	4.4	0.2	18.3	4.2	0.2
Tybjerg	29.0	4.2	10.0	9.0	5.2	0.4	1.2	6.5	0.0	30.5	3.5	0.6
Holme-Olstrup	28.5	1.8	21.9	7.1	3.1	0.1	0.5	4.7	0.2	29.3	2.8	0.0
Toksværd	24.3	2.8	9.6	9.5	2.5	0.3	0.7	4.9	0.1	41.2	3.9	0.1
Glumsø	44.2	5.0	10.9	6.2	6.0	0.6	1.2	4.3	0.0	15.7	5.7	0.1
Sandby	22.9	9.5	17.5	11.3	5.5	0.0	1.1	8.0	0.0	19.3	5.1	0.0
Grønnegades Kaserne	36.7	8.0	17.3	5.2	6.4	0.3	1.6	2.5	0.1	16.0	5.2	0.7
Lille Næstved Skole - Karrebækvej	38.7	7.1	18.4	4.9	5.1	0.1	2.5	2.7	0.0	16.6	3.6	0.2
Herlufmagle	38.0	3.3	12.1	7.1	4.4	0.4	0.7	6.6	0.0	22.9	4.3	0.3
Skelby	29.4	3.4	16.6	9.4	2.6	1.7	2.6	5.7	0.0	22.0	6.3	0.3
Ellebækskolen - Kildemark	41.4	6.2	12.5	7.3	7.6	0.4	1.6	3.7	0.2	13.4	5.2	0.4
Arena Næstved	41.0	7.9	16.9	5.3	5.7	0.3	1.5	3.1	0.0	14.0	4.1	0.2
Kobberbakkeskolen - Sct. Jørgen	44.1	6.2	15.3	5.7	5.4	0.3	1.0	3.7	0.1	14.2	3.7	0.3
Ellebækskolen - Kalbyris	43.8	5.9	13.8	8.0	6.2	0.2	2.0	4.1	0.0	11.5	3.8	0.7
Kobberbakkeskolen - Rønnebæk	43.2	5.0	16.8	8.1	5.4	0.2	0.8	4.8	0.2	12.3	3.1	0.2
Kobberbakkeskolen - Sydby	49.0	6.6	10.9	6.0	4.5	0.3	0.9	4.2	0.3	13.9	3.2	0.1
Herlufsholmhallen	39.2	6.9	18.9	6.2	4.2	0.3	1.6	2.5	0.1	17.7	2.3	0.1
Lille Næstved Skole - Herlufsholm	33.4	10.3	22.9	3.8	4.9	0.2	1.3	1.8	0.0	17.8	3.3	0.1
Lille Næstved Skole - Hyllinge	30.5	3.5	13.0	12.2	5.3	0.3	1.2	3.8	0.2	25.1	4.5	0.2
Lille Næstved Skole - Karrebæk	39.5	4.5	19.4	5.3	4.5	0.3	1.2	4.5	0.1	17.1	3.6	0.1

== Results ==
Party		Votes	%	+/-	Seats	+/-
Næstved Municipality
A	Social Democrats	17,006	39.32	-0.09	13	0
V	Venstre	7,800	18.03	-6.58	6	-3
C	Conservatives	6,665	15.41	+9.10	5	+3
D	New Right	2,938	6.79	+5.53	2	+2
B	Social Liberals	2,421	5.60	-1.06	2	0
F	Green Left	2,185	5.05	+1.24	1	0
O	Danish People's Party	1,712	3.96	-5.16	1	-1
Ø	Red-Green Alliance	1,684	3.89	-0.80	1	-1
I	Liberal Alliance	569	1.32	-0.42	0	0
G	Vegan Party	120	0.28	New	0	New
Å	The Alternative	109	0.25	-0.77	0	0
U	Udenfor	42	0.10	New	0	New
Total		43,251	100	N/A	31	N/A
Invalid votes		213	0.32	+0.14		
Blank votes		668	0.99	+0.21		
Turnout		44,132	65.62	-5.54		
Source: valg.dk
