= Rønnede Municipality =

Former municipality in Denmark

Coordinates: 55°15′N 12°00′E

Rønnede Municipality was a municipality (Danish, kommune) in the former Storstrøm County in south Denmark. The municipality covered an area of 125 km^{2}, and had a total population of 7,289 (2005). Its last mayor was Kurt Rosner, a member of the Venstre (Liberal Party) political party.

The main town and site of its municipal council was the town of Rønnede with a population of 2,402 (1 January 2015)

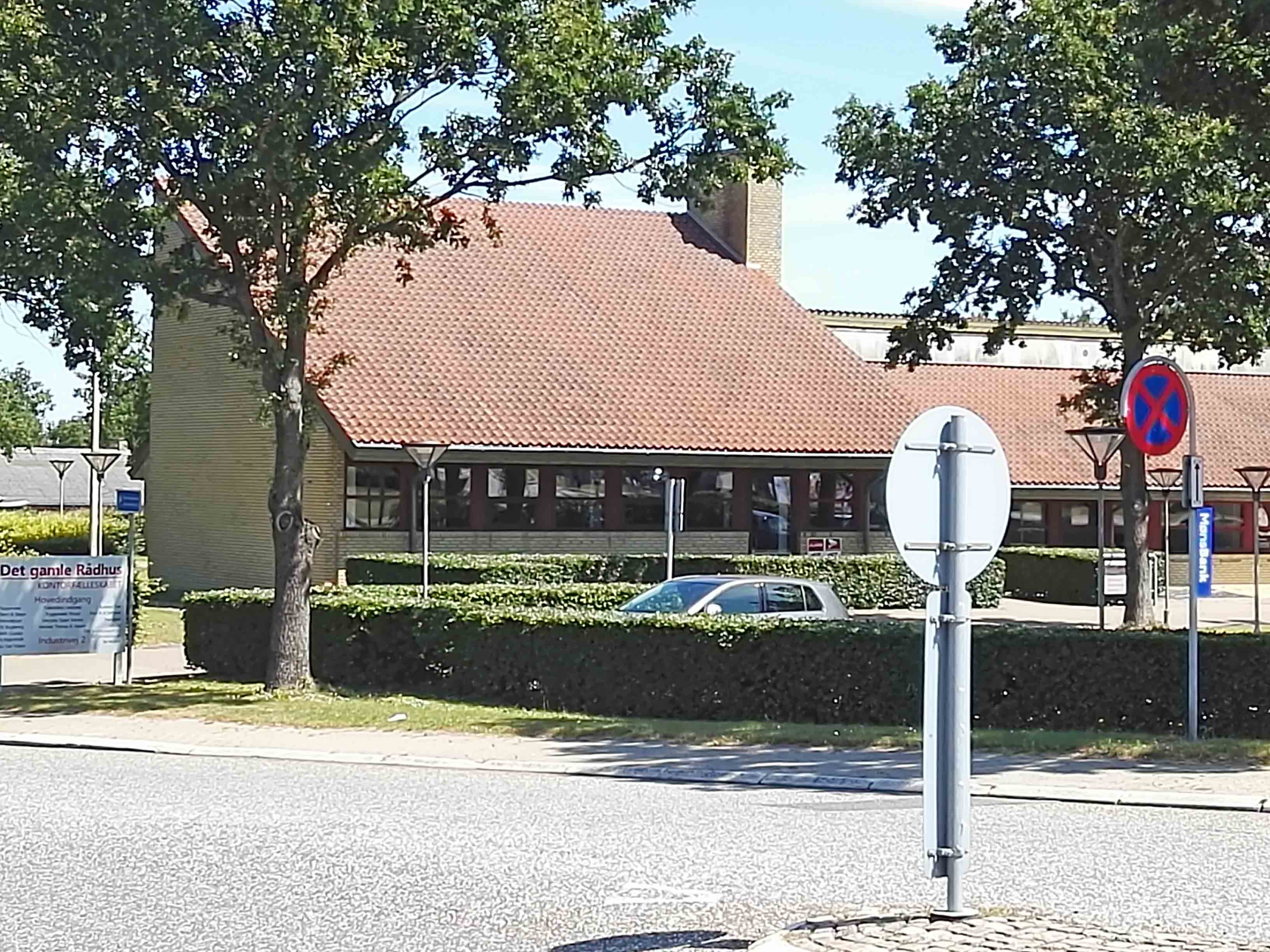
The former townhall of Rønnede Municipality

Neighboring municipalities were Fakse and Vallø to the east, Køge to the north, and Haslev, Holmegaard, and Fladså to the west. To the south was Fakse Bay (Fakse Bugt).

On 1 January 2007 Rønnede municipality ceased to exist due to Kommunalreformen ("The Municipality Reform" of 2007). It merged with the existing municipalities of Fakse and Haslev to form the new Faxe municipality. This created a municipality with an area of 406 km^{2} and a total population of 34,313 (2005). The new municipality belongs to the new Region Sjælland ("Zealand Region").
