= Suså River =

Coordinates: 55°11′45″N 11°44′35″E

Susåen
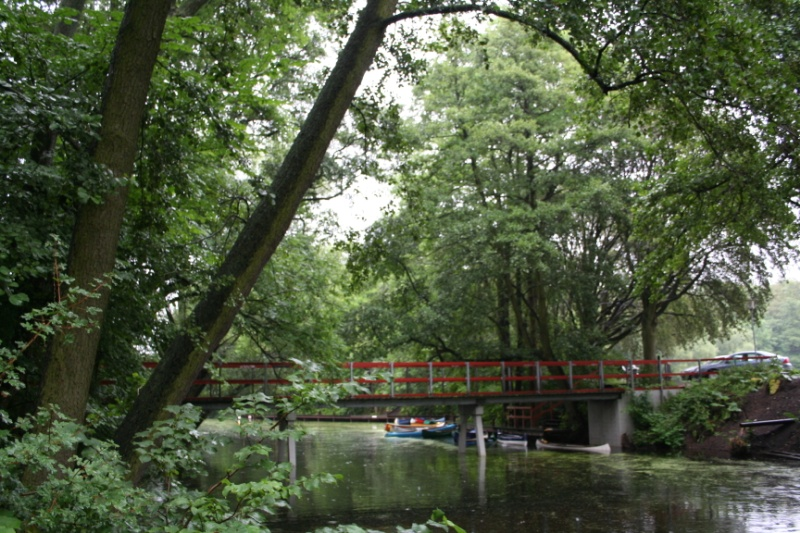

Location
- Country: Denmark
- Region: Region Sjælland
- Municipality: Næstved

Physical characteristics
- Source
  - location: Tingerup Tykke
  - elevation: 90 m (300 ft)
- Mouth
  - location: Næstved
  - elevation: 0 m (0 ft)
- Length: 83 km (52 mi)
- Basin size: 1,170 km^{2} (450 sq mi)
- Discharge
  - average: 6.1 m^{3}/s (220 cu ft/s)

The Suså or Susåen is a river in Denmark. It is the largest drainage system on the island of Zealand and the fifth largest in Denmark as a whole.

== Geography ==
The source of the Suså is in Tingerup Tykke, a woodland south of Rønnede. Its first section is called the Huleå (lit. "hole stream"), because it runs in a deep gully. It follows a winding course through Tingerup Tykke before turning to the north, where it runs through Gøgsmosen, near Rønedde, and further towards Hovmosen, near Gisselfeld, where it is joined by Brødebæk, Slettehavebæk and Kællingerend to form the Suså proper. From there it forms arc to the northwest, running past Haslev, Ringsted and Sorø before eventually turning south towards Næstved, where it drains into Karrebæksminde Bay. Between Sorø and Næstved it runs through Lake Tystrup-Bavelse, the 8th largest lake in Denmark and the site of its first natural park.

The Suså was created by glacial ice and meltwater during the Last Ice Age, c. 15,000 years ago. Its physical characteristics have been described in two studies.

== Flora and fauna ==
The Suså is highly biodiverse despite the fact that most of it has been regulated, in places from as early as the 17th century. There are about twenty species of fish in the river, though the stocks of many are low and some are red-listed as endangered species. The flora in the river itself is highly interesting and includes pondweed and arrowhead. The flora along the banks is not particularly interesting as most of it has been converted to agriculture.

Much of the Suså and its environs are part of the Natura 2000-protected area number 163, Suså, Tystrup-Bavelse Sø, Slagmosen, Holmegåds Mose og Porsmose. The river lacks the twists-and-turns and bed material needed for optimal plant and animal life. The Danish Nature Agency recommends that the maintenance of the waterway be less heavy-handed in future and has identified a surplus of nutrients in Lake Tystrup-Bavelse.

== History ==
The Suså has been used for transport since the Middle Ages. Goods were unloaded from ships at Karrebæksminde, near Næstved, and transported up the river by barge. The original mouth of the river at Karrebæk Fjord was replaced by a new canal in 1806–1812. The Danneskiold canal, constructed in 1813, added five sluices to the stretch of the river between Lake Bavelse and Karrebæksminde, making it possible to sail barges loaded with firewood up the river.

In 1937, the completion of a canal between Karrebæksminde and Næstved allowed ships to navigate all the way up to the city, where a new harbour was built. This altered the course of the river to run past Appernæs and removed the need for barge traffic from Karrebæksminde. Remains of the former river harbour can still be seen in Næstved, including an old paper mill built along the Suså—replaced by a factory in the new harbour—and 'kraneø' (lit. "crane island"), a small island in the river where materials for the paper mill were unloaded from barges. The old paper mill buildings are now used for office space by Næstved Municipality.

With the establishment of the new harbour in the 1930s, the course of the river between Lille Næstved and the harbour was covered and used for a four-lane road. This part of the river has recently been reopened as a recreational area; the concrete channel that formerly carried the river is now used as a rainwater drain.
