= Sandved =

Sandved may refer to:

== Places ==
- Sandved, Denmark, a village in Naestved Municipality in Region Zealand, Denmark
- Sandved, Norway, a borough in the city of Sandnes in Rogaland county, Norway
- Mount Sandved, a mountain in the Queen Elizabeth Range in Antarctica

== People ==
- David Sandved (1912–2001), Norwegian architect
- Kjell Bloch Sandved (1922–2015), Norwegian-born American author, lecturer, and nature photographer

== See also ==
- Sandve, a Norwegian village that is pronounced similarly to Sandved
