= 2021 Faxe municipal election =

← 2017	16 November 2021	2025 →

All 25 seats to the Faxe Municipal Council 13 seats needed for a majority
- Turnout: 19,266 (64.4%) ▼5.8pp
	First party	Second party	Third party
	A	V	O
Party	Social Democrats	Venstre	Danish People's Party
Last election	8 seats, 29.2%	7 seats, 25.0%	4 seats, 15.8%
Seats won	8	7	2
Seat change	0	0	▼2
Popular vote	5,541	5,041	1,508
Percentage	29.3%	26.7%	8.0%
Swing	▲0.1%	▲1.7%	▼7.8%
	Fourth party	Fifth party	Sixth party
	F	C	L
Party	Green Left	Conservatives	Lokallisten
Last election	1 seat, 5.2%	1 seat, 3.6%	2 seats, 8.8%
Seats won	2	2	1
Seat change	▲1	▲1	▼1
Popular vote	1,354	1,306	1,241
Percentage	7.2%	6.9%	6.6%
Swing	▲2%	▲3.3%	▼2.2%
	Seventh party	Eighth party	Ninth party
	D	Ø	I
Party	New Right	Red–Green Alliance	Liberal Alliance
Last election	Did Not Stand	1 seat, 5.7%	1 seat, 4.4%
Seats won	1	1	1
Seat change	▲1	0	0
Popular vote	982	873	743
Percentage	5.2%	4.6%	3.9%
Swing	New	▼1.1%	▼0.5%
Mayor before election
Ole Vive
Venstre
Mayor after election
Ole Vive
Venstre

Following the 2017 election, Ole Vive from Venstre won the mayor's position after the Social Democrats had held it in the 7 years prior to that election.

Originally Christina Birkemose was elected to be the candidate of the Social Democrats for this election. However internal conflict resulted in her losing the support, and therefore a new candidate was to be chosen. This time it would be Camilla Mayer who won the support from the Social Democrats.

In the election, the Social Democrats would once again become the biggest party. However the blue bloc won 13 seats, and it proved difficult for Camilla Meyer becoming the new mayor. It was eventually confirmed that Ole Vive from Venstre had a majority supporting him to continue as mayor.

== Electoral system ==
For elections to Danish municipalities, a number varying from 9 to 31 are chosen to be elected to the municipal council. The seats are then allocated using the D'Hondt method and a closed list proportional representation. Faxe Municipality had 25 seats in 2021

Unlike in Danish General Elections, in elections to municipal councils, electoral alliances are allowed.

== Electoral alliances ==
=== Electoral Alliance 1 ===
Party		Political alignment
B	Social Liberals	Centre to Centre-left
C	Conservatives	Centre-right
I	Liberal Alliance	Centre-right to Right-wing

=== Electoral Alliance 2 ===
Party		Political alignment
O	Danish People's Party	Right-wing to Far-right
V	Venstre	Centre-right

=== Electoral Alliance 3 ===
Party		Political alignment
A	Social Democrats	Centre-left
F	Green Left	Centre-left to Left-wing
Ø	Red–Green Alliance	Left-wing to Far-Left

== Results by polling station ==
L = Lokalisten

Division	A	B	C	D	F	I	L	O	V	Ø
Division	%	%	%	%	%	%	%	%	%	%
Haslev 01	29.3	1.5	8.7	4.4	8.2	5.5	1.8	7.7	29.4	3.7
Haslev 02	33.4	1.9	8.6	4.5	8.1	5.5	2.2	7.0	24.2	4.6
Faxe	31.3	1.2	4.6	5.2	4.6	2.6	12.4	7.2	28.0	2.9
Hylleholt	30.2	1.1	4.4	3.7	8.0	1.9	12.5	6.8	23.5	8.0
Rønnede	30.6	3.4	6.6	6.9	4.6	4.7	3.6	9.0	27.9	2.7
Dalby	25.4	1.9	7.3	7.1	5.4	2.9	5.5	8.6	34.3	1.7
Karise	20.4	1.4	5.6	6.5	9.6	2.0	14.4	10.8	20.3	9.0

== Results ==
Party		Votes	%	+/-	Seats	+/-
Faxe Municipality
A	Social Democrats	5,541	29.30	+0.06	8	0
V	Venstre	5,041	26.66	+1.67	7	0
O	Danish People's Party	1,508	7.97	-7.85	2	-2
F	Green Left	1,354	7.16	+1.91	2	+1
C	Conservatives	1,306	6.91	+3.33	2	+1
L	Lokallisten	1,241	6.56	New	1	New
D	New Right	982	5.19	New	1	New
Ø	Red-Green Alliance	873	4.62	-1.06	1	0
I	Liberal Alliance	743	3.93	-0.47	1	0
B	Social Liberals	323	1.71	-0.59	0	0
Total		18,912	100	N/A	25	N/A
Invalid votes		66	0.22	0.0		
Blank votes		288	0.96	+0.02		
Turnout		19,266	64.39	-5.78		
Source: valg.dk
