= Storstrøm County =

Storstrøm County Storstrøms Amt (Danish)
- County of Denmark
- Coat of arms

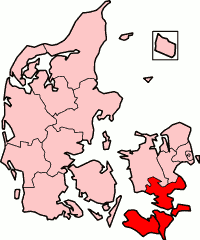
- Storstrøm County in Denmark
- Seat: Nykøbing Falster

Area
  - Total: 3,398 km^{2} (1,312 sq mi)

Population (2006)
  - Total: 262,781
  - Density: 77.33/km^{2} (200.3/sq mi)

Storstrøm County (Danish: Storstrøms Amt) is a former county (Danish: amt) on the islands of Zealand (Sjælland), Møn, Falster, Lolland and some minor islands in southeast Denmark. The county was formed on 1 April 1970, comprising the former counties of Maribo and Præstø. The county was abolished effective January 1, 2007, when it merged into Region Sjælland (i.e. Region Zealand).

The county was a somewhat artificial construction as the islands of Lolland and Falster did not traditionally share any institutions with Zealand, but rather with Funen. Locally, the adjectives nordenstrøms and søndenstrøms, i.e. "north" and "south of the Stream" were used to designate the Zealand-Møn and Lolland-Falster parts respectively, as they were separated by the strait Storstrømmen ("The Great Stream") from which the county derived its name.

== Insignia ==
The official coat of arms featured in chief a goose representing the Goose Tower on Vordingborg Castle in the former Præstø County. The two sea serpents (lindorme) were taken from the arms of the former Maribo County. The stream in the centre represents the Storstrømmen Strait. This coat of arms drifted out of use during the last years of the county's existence, and had effectively been replaced by a logo showing one of the Farø Bridges which span the Storstrømmen Strait, thus linking the northern and southern part of the county.

== List of county mayors ==
From	To	County Mayor
April 1, 1970	1984	Søren Trolborg (Social Democrat)
1984	December 31, 1997	Poul Christensen (Social Democrat)
January 1, 1998	September 15, 2004	Ivan Olsen (Social Democrat)
September 15, 2004	December 31, 2006	Bent Normann Olsen (Social Democrat)

== Municipalities (1970–2006) ==
- Fakse
- Fladså
- Holeby
- Holmegaard
- Højreby
- Langebæk
- Maribo
- Møn
- Nakskov
- Nykøbing Falster
- Nysted
- Næstved
- Nørre Alslev
- Præstø
- Ravnsborg
- Rudbjerg
- Rødby
- Rønnede
- Sakskøbing
- Stevns
- Stubbekøbing
- Suså
- Sydfalster
- Vordingborg
