= 2025 Faxe municipal election =

Municipal election in Denmark

← 2021	18 November 2025	2029 →

All 25 seats to the Faxe municipal council 13 seats needed for a majority
- Turnout: 20,698 (66.8%) ▲2.5%
	First party	Second party	Third party
	V	A	I
Party	Venstre	Social Democrats	Liberal Alliance
Last election	7 seats, 26.7%	8 seats, 29.3%	1 seat, 3.9%
Seats won	5	4	3
Seat change	▼2	▼4	▲2
Popular vote	4,295	3,483	2,217
Percentage	21.2%	17.2%	10.9%
Swing	▼5.5%	▼12.1%	▲7.0%
	Fourth party	Fifth party	Sixth party
	O	F	L
Party	Danish People's Party	Green Left	Lokallisten
Last election	2 seats, 8.0%	2 seats, 7.2%	1 seat, 6.6%
Seats won	3	3	2
Seat change	▲1	▲1	▲1
Popular vote	2,147	1,838	1,443
Percentage	10.6%	9.1%	7.1%
Swing	▲2.6%	▲1.9%	▲0.5%
	Seventh party	Eighth party	Ninth party
	C	T	Æ
Party	Conservatives	HaslevFaxe-Listen	Denmark Democrats
Last election	2 seats, 6.9%	Did not stand	Did not stand
Seats won	2	1	1
Seat change	0	▲1	▲1
Popular vote	1,152	1,137	1,027
Percentage	5.7%	5.6%	5.1%
Swing	▼1.2%	New	New
Mayor before election
Ole Vive
Venstre
Mayor after election
Mikkel B. Dam
Liberal Alliance

The 2025 Faxe Municipal election was held on November 18, 2025, to elect the 25 members to sit in the regional council for the Faxe Municipal council, in the period of 2026 to 2029. Mikkel B. Dam from the Liberal Alliance, would win the mayoral position.

== Background ==
Following the 2021 election, Ole Vive from Venstre became mayor for his second term. He would run for a third term.

== Electoral system ==
For elections to Danish municipalities, a number varying from 9 to 31 are chosen to be elected to the municipal council. The seats are then allocated using the D'Hondt method and a closed list proportional representation. Faxe Municipality had 25 seats in 2025.

== Electoral alliances ==
=== Electoral Alliance 1 ===
Party		Political alignment
C	Conservatives	Centre-right
O	Danish People's Party	Right-wing to Far-right
Æ	Denmark Democrats	Right-wing to Far-right

=== Electoral Alliance 2 ===
Party		Political alignment
F	Green Left	Centre-left to Left-wing
T	HaslevFaxe-Listen	Local politics
Ø	Red-Green Alliance	Left-wing to Far-Left

=== Electoral Alliance 3 ===
Party		Political alignment
I	Liberal Alliance	Centre-right to Right-wing
L	Lokallisten	Local politics
M	Moderates	Centre to Centre-right

== Results by polling station ==
Division	A	C	F	I	L	M	N	O	T	V	Y	Æ	Ø
Division	%	%	%	%	%	%	%	%	%	%	%	%	%
Nordskov	16.0	6.6	9.2	14.6	4.9	0.5	3.1	8.3	8.2	22.4	0.2	3.2	2.8
Sofiendal	17.2	6.3	9.5	14.3	4.5	1.1	2.9	8.3	9.1	19.1	0.0	3.1	4.4
Faxe Hallen	21.8	4.8	7.3	8.0	13.5	0.5	1.6	11.3	2.5	19.0	0.0	6.3	3.2
Hylleholt	19.9	4.1	10.0	7.0	11.5	0.7	1.5	9.2	3.4	18.1	0.0	7.5	7.0
Karise	15.4	5.6	11.3	6.1	6.9	0.9	1.5	12.5	2.8	19.4	0.4	9.2	8.0
Dalby	12.4	4.7	8.2	9.6	5.4	0.8	3.1	15.0	4.3	29.5	0.4	4.8	1.9
Rønnede	17.6	6.1	7.1	10.3	6.8	0.5	4.1	14.4	3.2	22.3	0.2	4.9	2.5

== Results ==
Party		Votes	%	+/-	Seats	+/-
Faxe Municipality
V	Venstre	4,295	21.17	-5.49	5	-2
A	Social Democrats	3,483	17.16	-12.13	4	-4
I	Liberal Alliance	2,217	10.93	+7.00	3	+2
O	Danish People's Party	2,147	10.58	+2.61	3	+1
F	Green Left	1,838	9.06	+1.90	3	+1
L	Lokallisten	1,443	7.11	+0.55	2	+1
C	Conservatives	1,152	5.68	-1.23	2	0
T	HaslevFaxe-Listen	1,137	5.60	New	1	New
Æ	Denmark Democrats	1,027	5.06	New	1	New
Ø	Red-Green Alliance	842	4.15	-0.47	1	0
N	Fair Forvaltning	530	2.61	New	0	New
M	Moderates	149	0.73	New	0	New
Y	Klar Retning	32	0.16	New	0	New
Total		20,292	100	N/A	25	N/A
Invalid votes		64	0.21	-0.01		
Blank votes		342	1.10	+0.21		
Turnout		20,698	66.85	+2.45		
Source: valg.dk

== Opinion polls ==
Polling firm	Fieldwork date	Sample size	A	V	O	F	C	L	Ø	I	M	N	T	Y	Æ	Others	Lead
Epinion	4 Sep - 13 Oct 2025	385	26.2	15.4	11.5	12.8	3.3	–	6.3	8.3	1.1	–	–	–	8.5	6.6	10.8
2024 european parliament election	9 Jun 2024		17.4	15.4	10.8	14.9	8.3	–	4.4	6.5	6.5	–	–	–	10.2	–	2.0
2022 general election	1 Nov 2022		30.0	11.6	4.7	9.2	4.1	–	2.6	6.7	10.8	–	–	–	10.5	–	18.4
2021 regional election	16 Nov 2021		34.2	25.0	7.9	6.7	9.6	–	4.9	1.9	–	–	–	–	–	–	9.2
2021 municipal election	16 Nov 2021		29.3 (8)	26.7 (7)	8.0 (2)	7.2 (2)	6.9 (2)	6.6 (1)	4.6 (1)	3.9 (1)	–	–	–	–	–	–	2.6
