= Tingerup Tykke =

River source

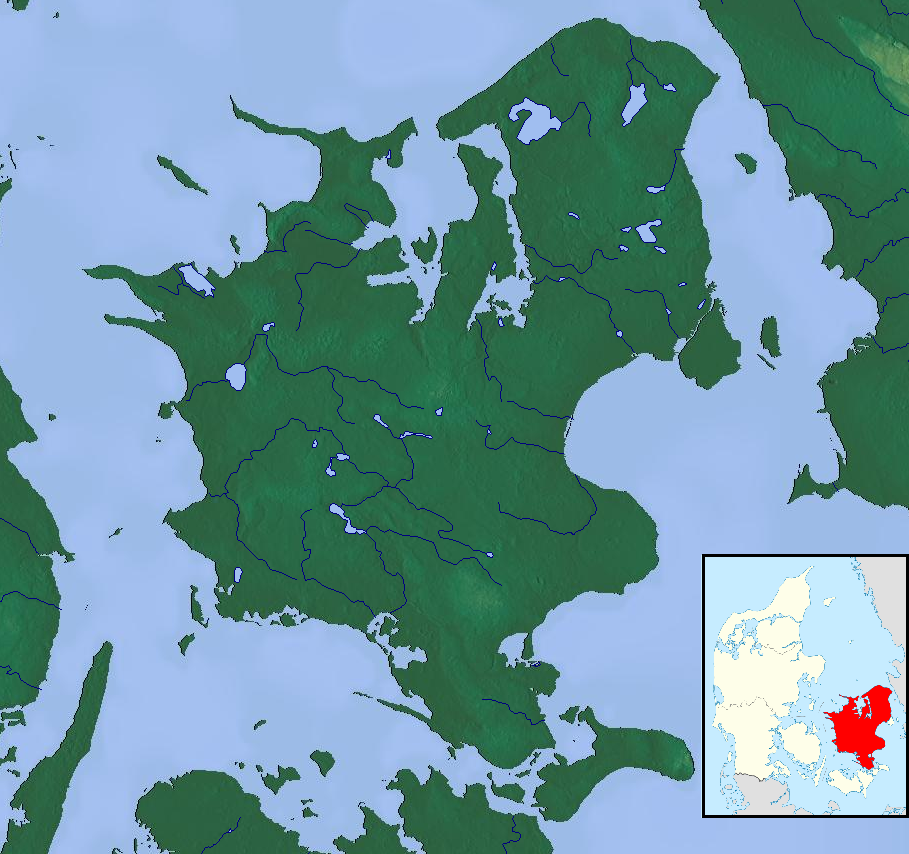
- Location within Zealand Location within Denmark
- Interactive map of Tingerup Tykke

Geography
- Location: Zealand, Denmark
- Coordinates: 55.2345°N 12.0160°E
- Elevation: 90 m (300 ft)

Ecology
- Ecosystem: Atlantic mixed forest
- Forest cover: Deciduous

Tingerup Tykke is a woodland located south of Rønnede on the island of Zealand in eastern Denmark. It is the site of source of the Suså River, Denmark's fifth largest river.

Tingerup Tykke is located just south of Rønnede, some 20 km (12 mi) east of Næstved.
