= Dresselberg =

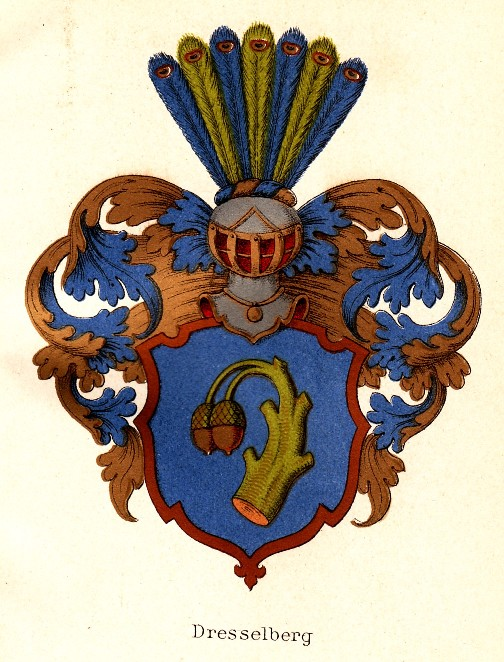
Dresselberg coat of arms.

The Dresselberg family is an extinct, medieval Danish noble family.

== History ==
The family lived on Zealand. Its first known member was Henrik Jensen in Lyngby who is mentioned in 1470. The last member of the family was Vilhelm Dresselberg who died in 1620.

== Insignia ==
Their shield featured a green oak branch with two yellow acorns on blue background. Their helmet featured eight alternating blue and green peacock feathers.

== Property ==
The family is for instance associated with Dragsholm and Vindingegaard.

== Notable members ==
- Vilhelm Dresselberg (1545–1620)
