= Haslev Municipality =

Former municipality of Denmark

Coordinates: 55°20′00″N 11°58′00″E

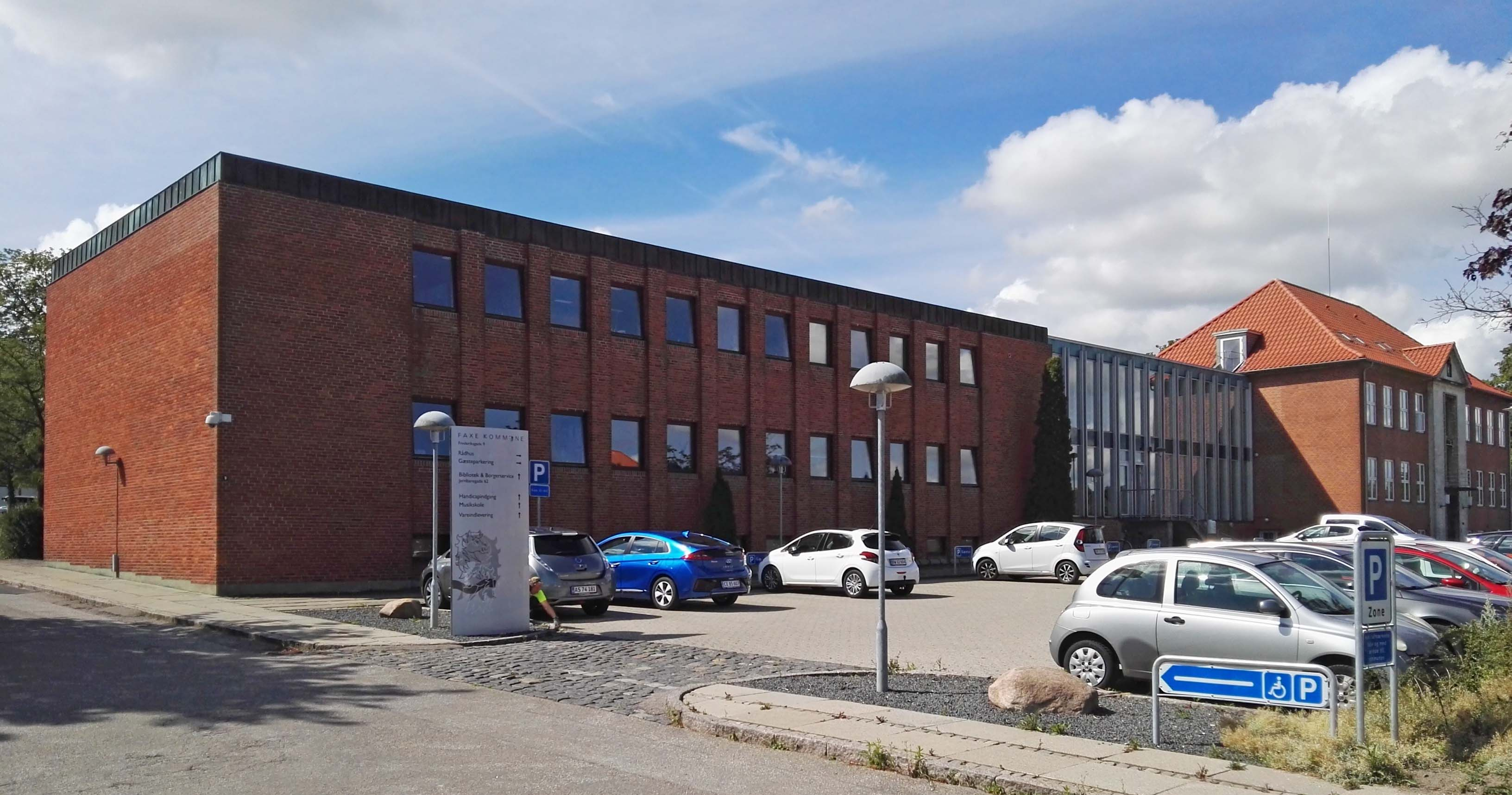
Haslev Municipality Town Hall at Frederiksgade 9 in Haslev, now Faxe Municipality Town Hall. Built in the mid-1930s for Haslev-Freerslev parish municipality

Until 1 January 2007, Haslev municipality was a Danish, kommune) in West Zealand County on the island of Zealand (Sjælland) in Denmark. The municipality covered an area of 133 km^{2}, and had a total population of 14,781 (2005). Its last mayor was Henrik Christensen, a member of the Venstre (Liberal Party) political party. The main town and site of its municipal council was the town of Haslev.

Haslev municipality ceased to exist after the Kommunalreformen ("The Municipality Reform" of 2007). It was merged with the existing Fakse and Rønnede municipalities to form the new Faxe municipality. This new municipality, with an area of 406 km^{2} and a total population of 34,313 (2005), belongs to the Region Sjælland ("Zealand Region").
