= Mogenstrup =

Town in Denmark

- Town
- Location in Denmark Mogenstrup (Denmark Region Zealand)
- Coordinates: 55°10′44″N 11°51′48″E
- Country: Denmark
- Region: Region Zealand
- Municipality: Næstved Municipality

Area
  - Urban: 1.6 km^{2} (0.62 sq mi)

Population (2026)
  - Urban: 2,090
  - Urban density: 1,300/km^{2} (3,400/sq mi)
- Time zone: UTC+1 (CET)
  - Summer (DST): UTC+2 (CEST)
- Postal code: DK-4700 Næstved

Mogenstrup is a town, with a population of 2,090 (1 January 2026), in Næstved Municipality, Region Zealand in Denmark. It is located 10 km southeast of Næstved.

Mogenstrup was the municipal seat of the former Fladså Municipality until 1 January 2007.

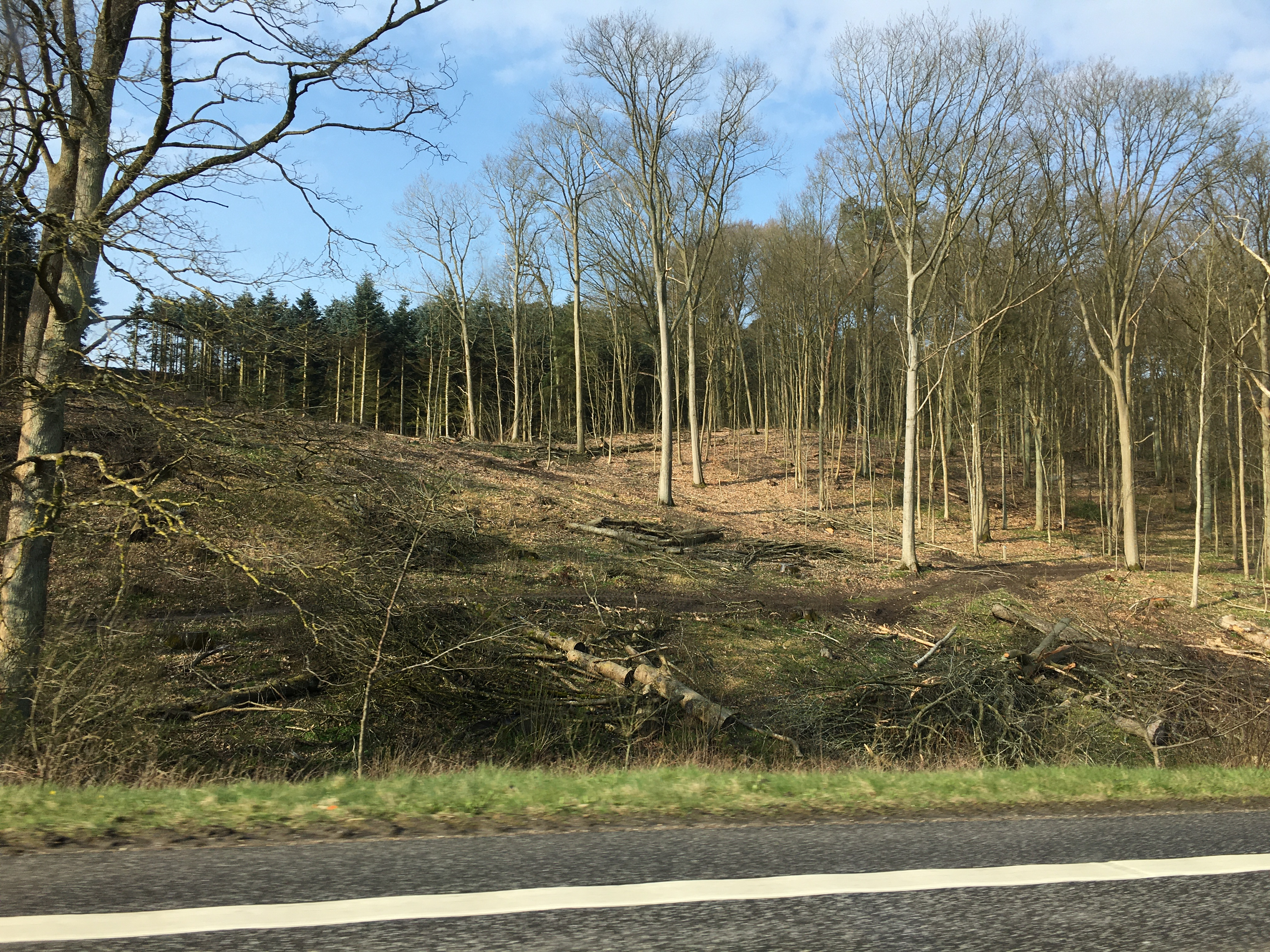
Mogenstrup Ås

Mogenstrup is situated just south of Mogenstrup Ås. It is Denmark's largest esker with a length of 10 km, a width of 500 metres and an elevation up to 59 metres above the surrounding ground.

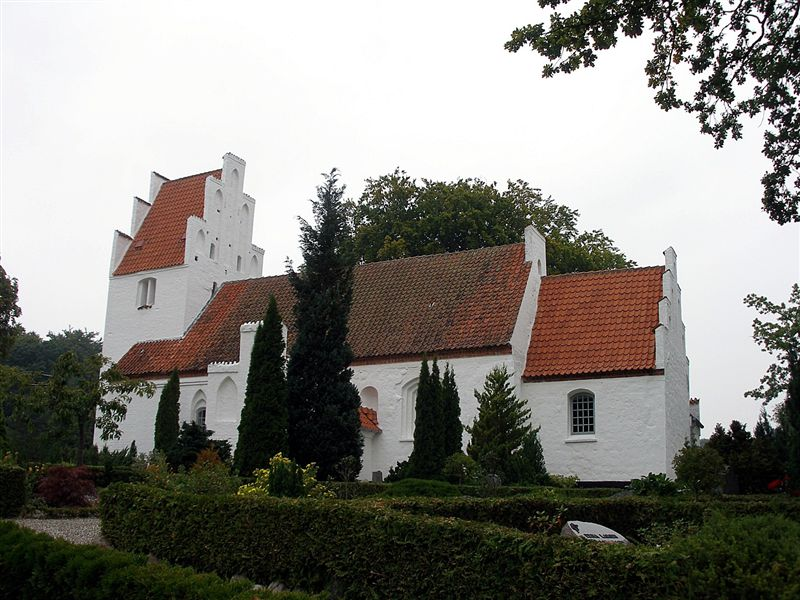
Mogenstrup Church

Mogenstrup Church is located on the northern outskirts of the town.

Sydsjællands Golfklub is a golf club located on the northeastern outskirts of the town just east of the road between Næstved and Præstø.

Fladså Svømmehal is a gym and indoor swimming pool located directly next door to Mogenstrup School, officially named Fladsåskolen.
