= Dyre (noble family) =

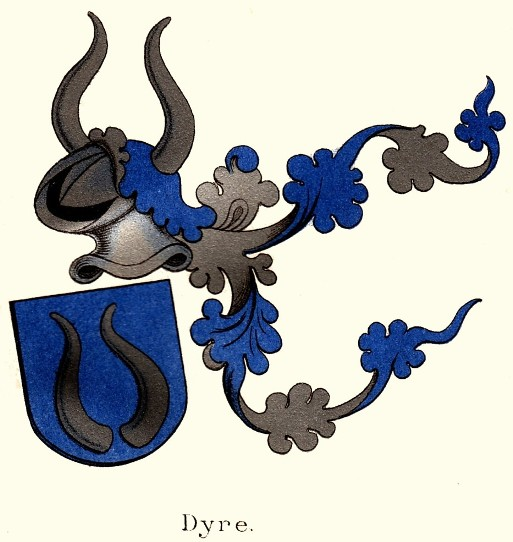
Dyre coat of arms.

The Dyre family is an extinct, Danish medieval noble family.

== History ==
The first known member of the family is Offe Dyre who is mentioned in 1308. The family had both a branch on Zealand and a branch in Jutland. The branch in Jutland also used the names Skeel and Lunge while the branch on Zealand also used the name Sosadel. The last member of the family was Justitsråd Palle Dyre of Trinderup (died 1707).

== Insignia ==
Its coat of arms featured two white bison horns on blue background. It helmet featured two white bison horns.

== Property ==
The branch on Zealand is associated with the estates Tølløse, Selsø, Svenstrup, Gjorslev and Vindingegaard. The branch in Jutland is for instance associated with the estates Odden, Birkelse and Hessel.

== Notable members ==
- Mette Dyre
- Source
