= Fladså =

Former municipality in Denmark

Coordinates: 55°12′02″N 11°49′59″E

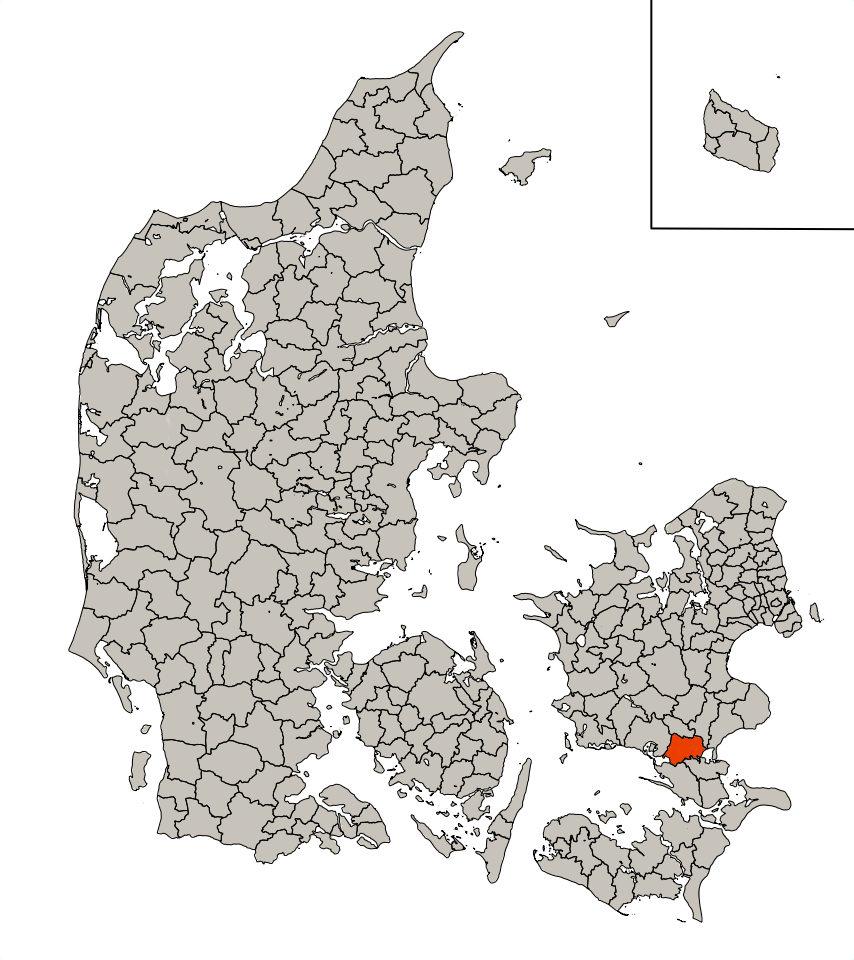
Fladså Municipality’s location in Denmark

Fladså was a municipality (Danish, kommune) in Storstrøm County in south Denmark. The municipality covered an area of 133 km^{2}, and had a total population of 7,581 (2005). Its last mayor was Hans R. Hansen, a member of the Venstre (Liberal Party) political party.

The seat of its municipal council was at Mogenstrup.

Neighboring municipalities were Rønnede to the east, Holmegaard to the north, Næstved to the west, and Præstø and Vordingborg to the south. Fakse Bay (Fakse Bugt) made up part of the municipality's eastern border, and Karrebæksminde Bay (Karrebæksminde Bugt made up part of the municipality's western border.

On 1 January 2007 Fladså municipality ceased to exist due to Kommunalreformen ("The Municipality Reform" of 2007). It merged with Fuglebjerg, Holmegaard, Næstved, and Suså municipalities to form the new Næstved Municipality. This will create a municipality with an area of 681 km^{2} and a total population of 78,446 (2005). The new municipality will belong to the new Region Sjælland ("Zealand Region").
