= Suså Municipality =

Former human settlement in Denmark

Coordinates: 55°21′22″N 11°41′06″E

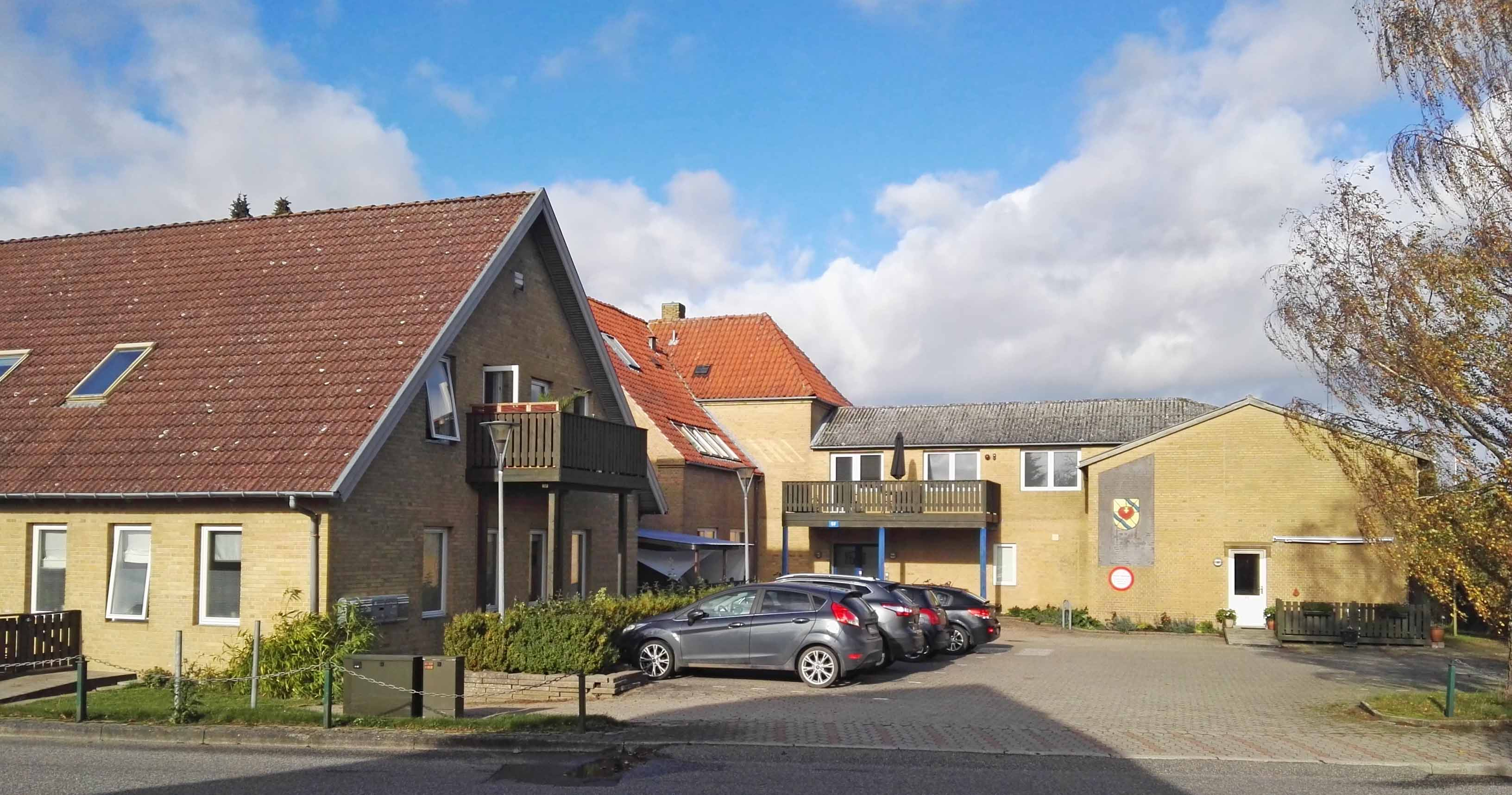
The former Suså Municipality town hall at Realskolevej 5 in Glumsø.

Until 1 January 2007 Suså was a municipality (Danish, kommune) in the former Storstrøm County in the southern part of the island of Zealand (Sjælland) in south Denmark. The municipality covered an area of 145 km^{2}, and had a total population of 8,529 (2005). Its last mayor was Poul Erik Sørensen, a member of the Social Democrats (Socialdemokraterne) political party. The main town and the site of its municipal council was the town of Glumsø.

Suså municipality ceased to exist due to Kommunalreformen ("The Municipality Reform" of 2007). It was merged with Fladså, Fuglebjerg, Holmegaard, and Næstved municipalities to form the new Næstved municipality. This created a municipality with an area of 681 km^{2} and a total population of 78,446 (2005). The new municipality belongs to Region Sjælland ("Zealand Region").
