= Sandved, Denmark =

Sandved
- Village
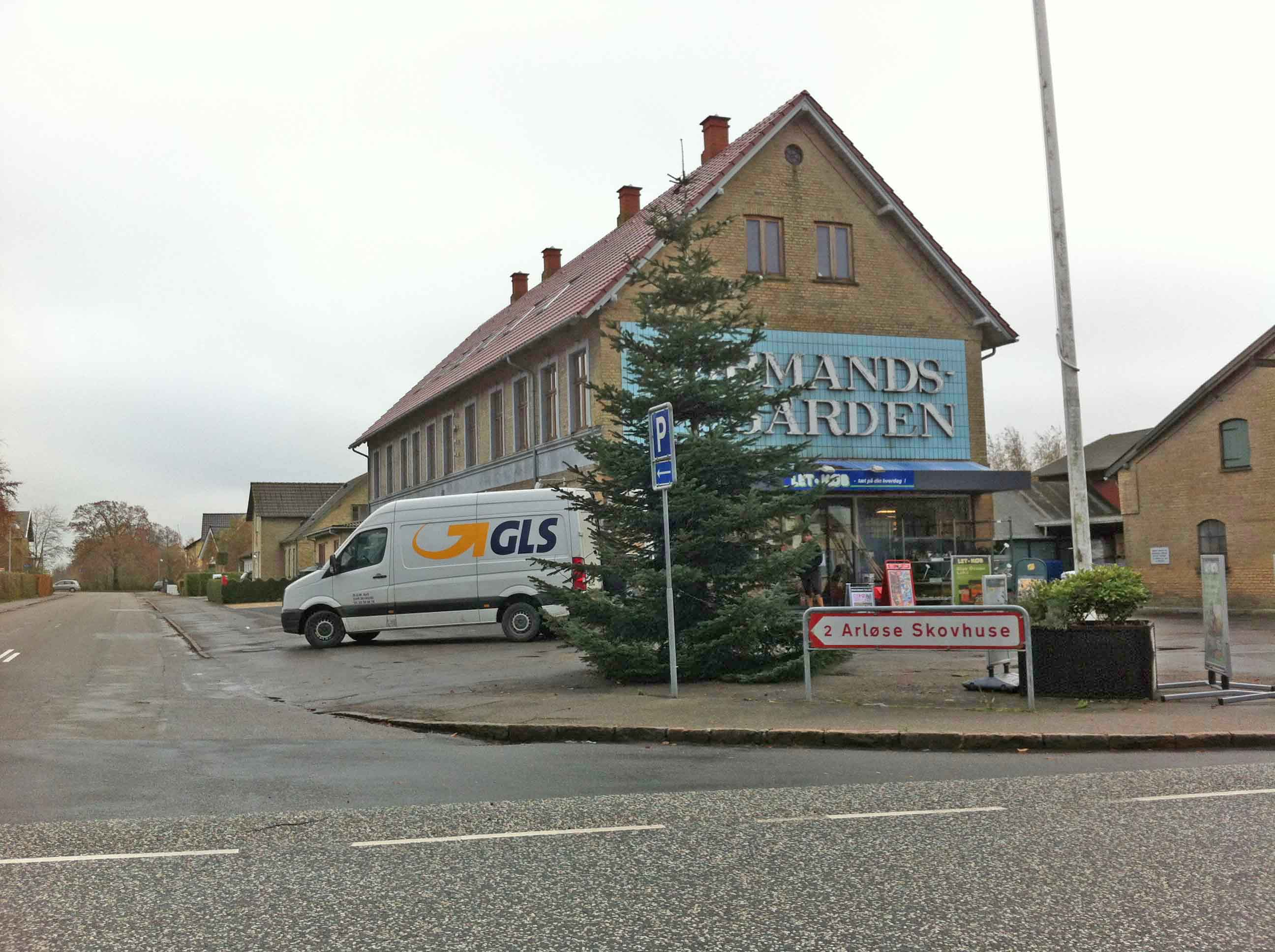
- Købmandsgården (The Merchant's Mansion) in Sandved

- Location in Region Zealand Sandved (Denmark)
- Coordinates: 55°15′50″N 11°31′5″E
- Country: Denmark
- Region: Region Zealand
- Municipality: Næstved Municipality

Population (2026)
  - Total: 686
- Time zone: UTC+1 (CET)
  - Summer (DST): UTC+2 (CEST)

Sandved is a village, with a population of 686 (1 January 2026), in Næstved Municipality, Region Zealand, Denmark.
