= Næstved Municipality =

Næstved Municipality Næstved Kommune (Danish)
- Municipality
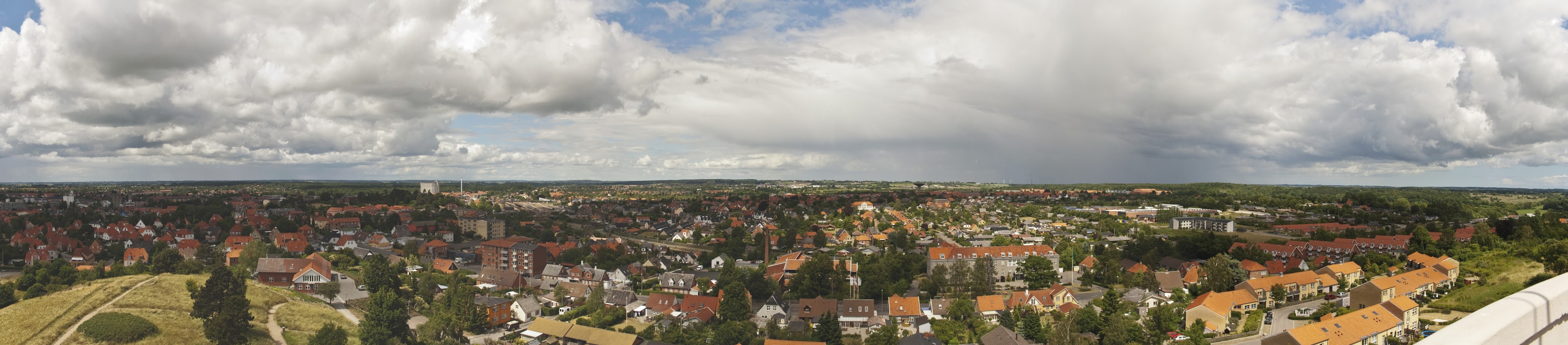

- Coat of arms

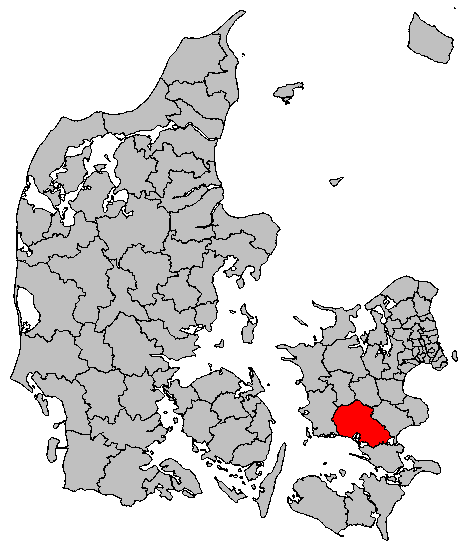
- Coordinates: 55°15′00″N 11°40′00″E
- Country: Denmark
- Region: Zealand
- Established: 1 January 2007
- Seat: Næstved

Government
  - Mayor: Carsten Rasmussen (S)

Area
  - Total: 681 km^{2} (263 sq mi)

Population (1 January 2026)
  - Total: 85,163
  - Density: 125/km^{2} (324/sq mi)
- Time zone: UTC+1 (CET)
  - Summer (DST): UTC+2 (CEST)
- Postal code: 4700
- Island: Zealand
- Municipal code: 370
- Website: www.naestved.dk

Næstved Municipality (Danish: Næstved Kommune) is a kommune in the Region Sjælland on the island of Zealand in the south of Denmark. The municipality includes the island of Gavnø. It covers an area of 681 km^{2}, and has a total population of 85,163 (2026). The main town and the site of its municipal council is the town of Næstved.

On 1 January 2007, Kommunalreformen ("The Municipal Reform" of 2007) merged the Næstved municipality with existing Fladså, Fuglebjerg, Holmegaard, and Suså municipalities to form the new Næstved municipality, increasing the total population to more than 80,000. As of 2024 the mayor is Carsten Rasmussen.

== Locations ==
The ten largest locations in the municipality are:

Næstved	43,800
Fensmark	5,100
Fuglebjerg	2,200
Glumsø	2,100
Mogenstrup	2,000
Karrebæksminde	1,800
Tappernøje	1,600
Herlufmagle	1,400
Gelsted	1,300
Holme-Olstrup	1,200

== Politics ==
=== Municipal council ===
Næstved's municipal council consists of 31 members, elected every four years.

Below are the municipal councils elected since the Municipal Reform of 2007.

Election	Party							Total seats	Turnout	Elected mayor
Election	A	B	C	F	O	V	Ø	Total seats	Turnout	Elected mayor
2005	17	1	2	1	1	9		31	69.0%	Henning Jensen (A)
2009	11	2	2	4	3	9		31	64.5%	Henning Jensen (A)
2013	14	1	3	1	3	8	1	31	74.0%	Carsten Rasmussen (A)
2017	13	2	2	1	2	9	2	31	71.2%	Carsten Rasmussen (A)
Data from Kmdvalg.dk 2005, 2009, 2013 and 2017

== Attractions ==
- Gavnø Castle on the island of Gavnø has a large, beautiful park with seasonal flower displays. A magnificent display of spring bulbs can be seen during the month of May. The castle has an extensive collection of paintings. In addition to the castle and grounds, there is a church, a live, tropical butterfly collection, and a collection of historic firetrucks. It is open annually from mid-April until the end of August.
- The boat Friheden ("Freedom") runs regular, round-trip service from May–August. The 2½ hour trip starts in the center of Næstved, and goes through the Næstved Canal, to the Gavnø Castle, and out on Karrebæk Fjord to the town of Karrebæksminde before returning to Næstved. It is possible to disembark at Gavnø and at Karrebæksminde.
- Herlufsholm School is Denmark's oldest private boarding school.
- Susåen ("The Suså River"), Zealand's largest waterway and longest river, runs through Næstved.

== Notable people ==
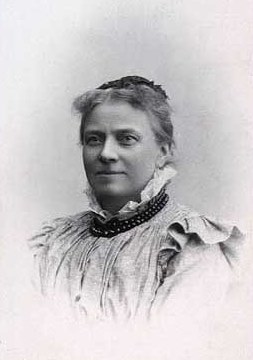
Matilde Bajer, 1890s

- Claus Daa (1579 in Ravnstrup – 1641) a Danish admiral, nobleman and landowner
- Frederik Danneskjold-Samsøe (1703 in Assendrup Manor – 1778) a politician, minister, admiral, chief of the Danish marine
- Jacob Holm (1770 in Skafterup – 1845) a Danish industrialist, ship owner and merchant
- Christian Winther (1796 in Fensmark – 1876) a Danish lyric poet
- Malthe Conrad Lottrup (1815 in Holmegaard – 1870) a Danish merchant, politician and brewer
- Matilde Bajer (1840 in Frederikseg – 1934) a Danish women's rights activist and pacifist
- Eggert Achen (1853 in Kvislemark – 1913) a Danish architect
- L. A. Ring (1854 in Ring – 1933) a Danish painter, pioneered symbolism and social realism
- Bodil Hellfach (1856 in Hyllinge – 1941) a pioneering Danish nurse
- Charlotte Munck (1876 in Lille Næstved – 1932) a pioneering Danish nurse
- Knud Børge Martinsen (1905 in Sandved - 1949) a Danish officer in the Free Corps Denmark
- Michel Nykjær (born 1979 in Tappernøje) a Danish auto racing driver

== Image gallery ==
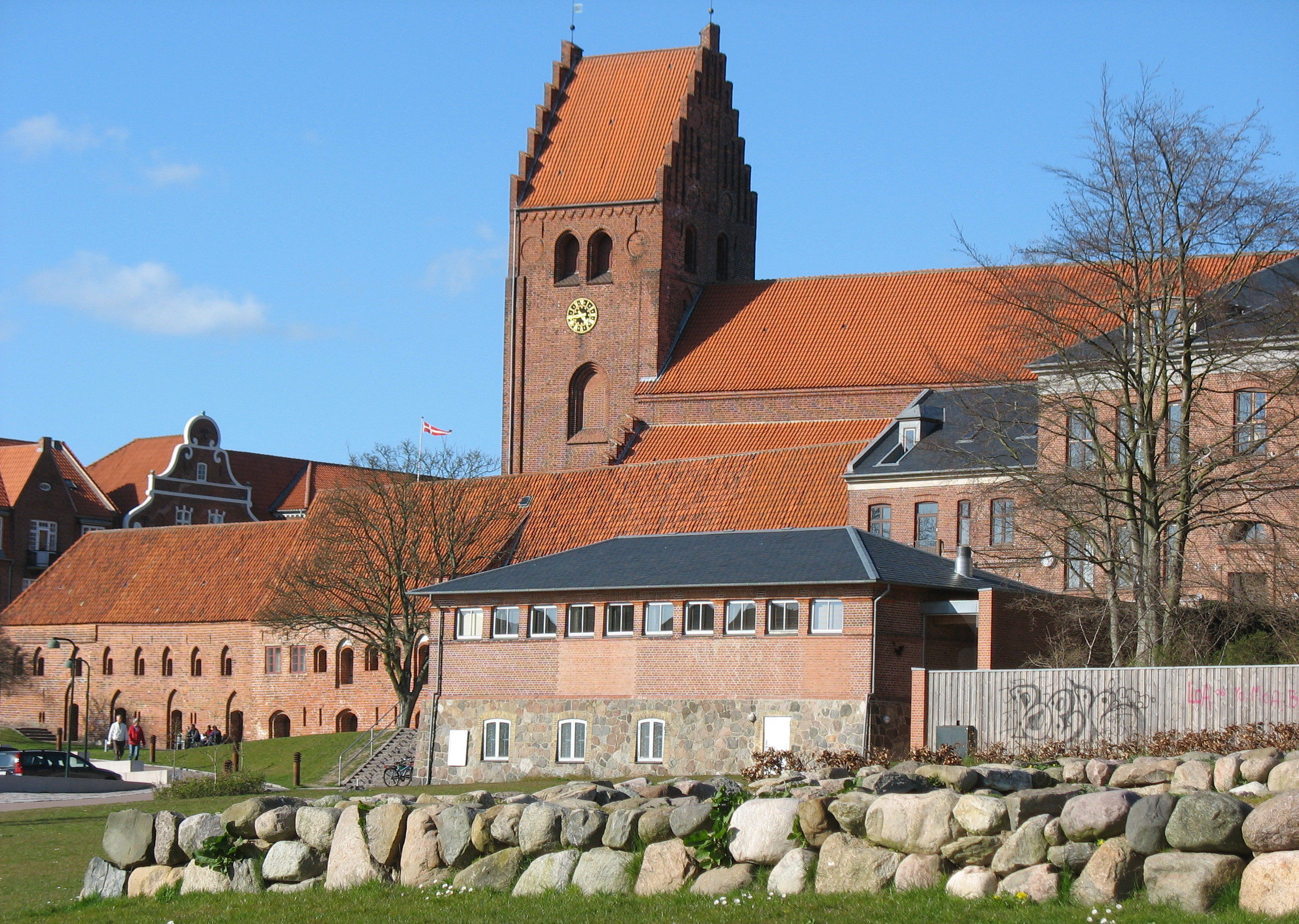
St. Peter's Church in Næstved

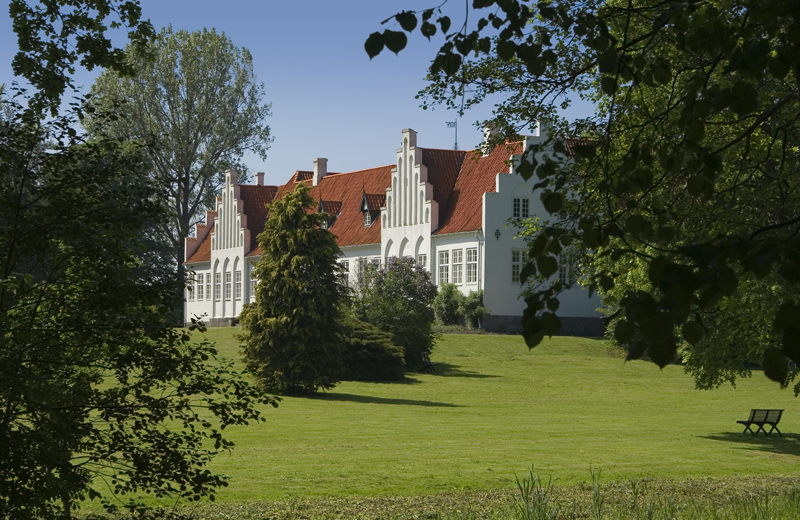
Rønnebæksholm

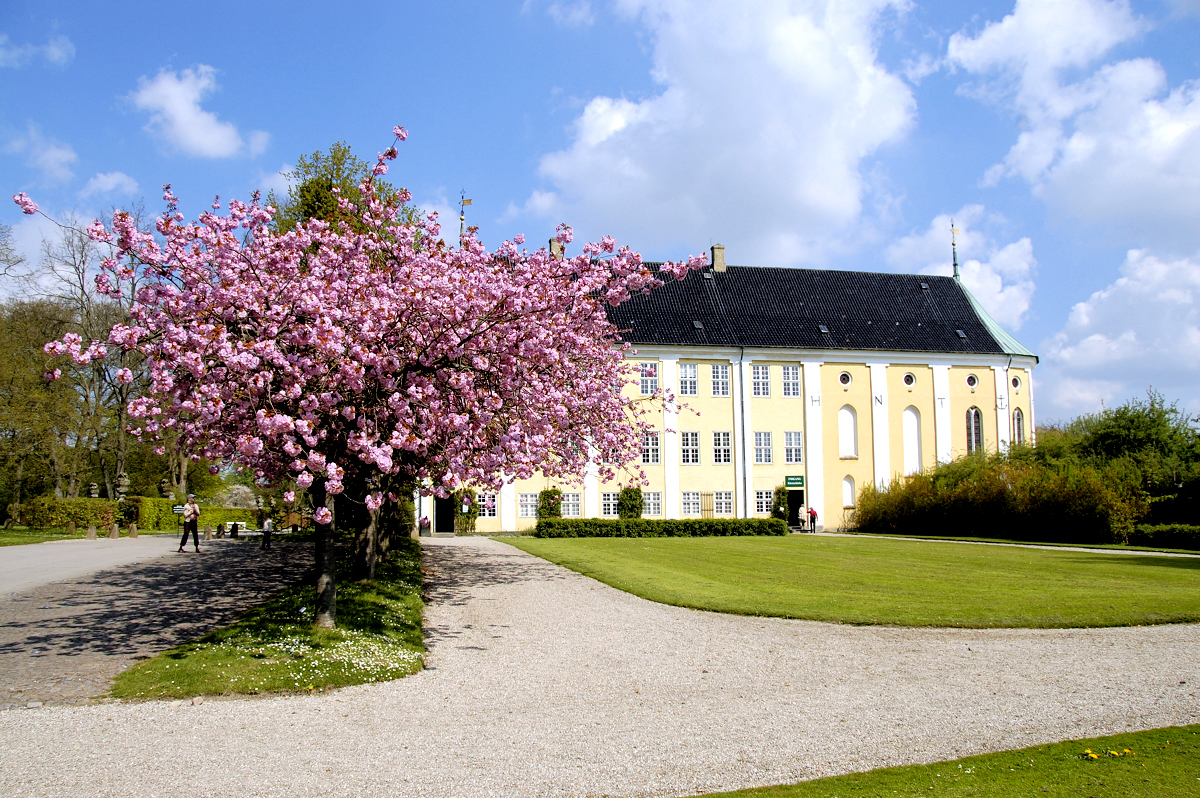
Gavnø

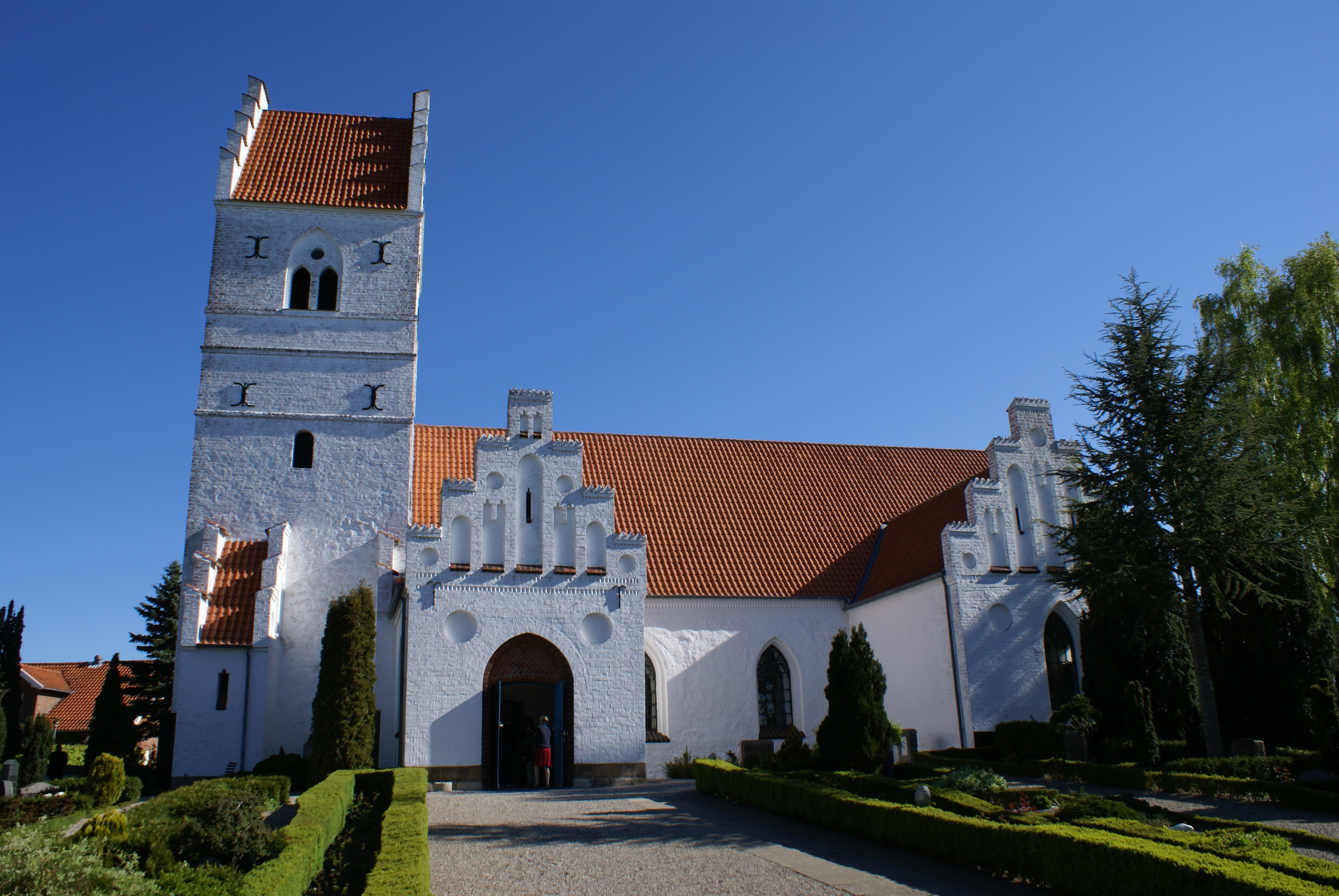
HerlufmagleKirke Church
