= Herlufmagle =

- Town
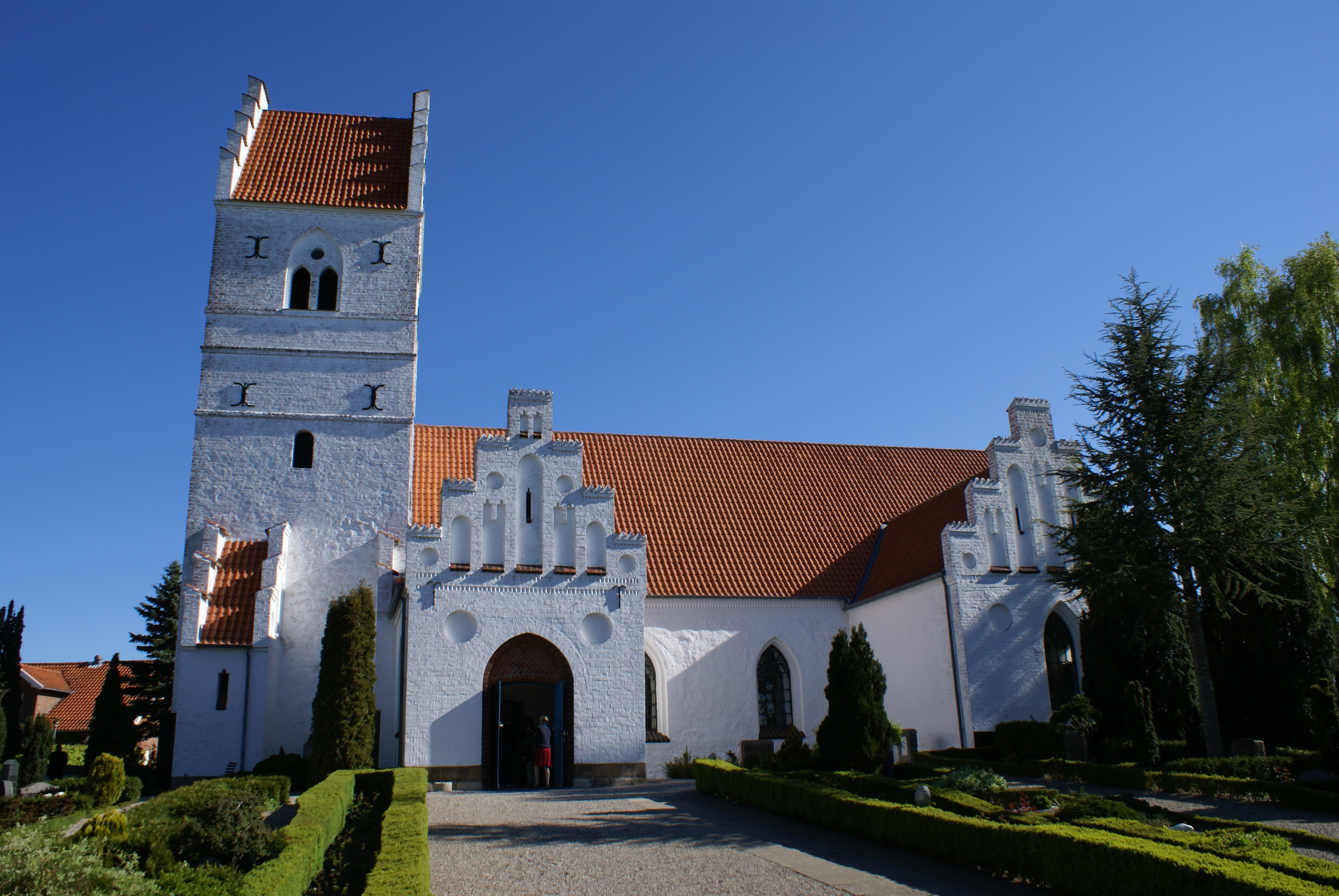
- Herlufmagle Church

- Location in Denmark Herlufmagle (Denmark Region Zealand)
- Coordinates: 55°18′42″N 11°45′9″E
- Country: Denmark
- Region: Region Zealand
- Municipality: Næstved Municipality

Area
  - Urban: 1.1 km^{2} (0.42 sq mi)

Population (2026)
  - Urban: 1,423
  - Urban density: 1,300/km^{2} (3,400/sq mi)
- Time zone: UTC+1 (CET)
  - Summer (DST): UTC+2 (CEST)
- Postal code: DK-4160 Herlufmagle

Herlufmagle is a town, with a population of 1,423 (1 January 2026), in Næstved Municipality, Region Zealand in Denmark. It is located 5 km northwest of Fensmark and 10 km north of Næstved.

Herlufmagle Church is located in the town.
