= Fuglebjerg =

- Town
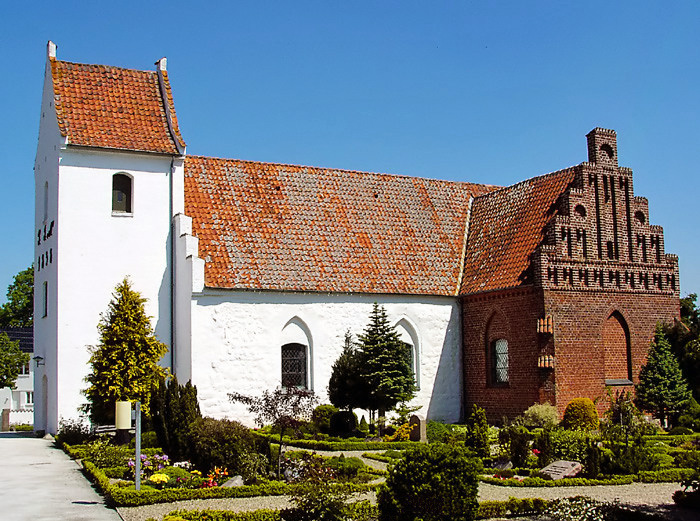
- Fuglebjerg Church

- Location in Denmark Fuglebjerg (Denmark Region Zealand)
- Coordinates: 55°18′7″N 11°32′35″E
- Country: Denmark
- Region: Region Sjælland
- Municipality: Næstved Municipality

Area
  - Urban: 1.5 km^{2} (0.58 sq mi)

Population (2026)
  - Urban: 2,321
  - Urban density: 1,500/km^{2} (4,000/sq mi)
- Time zone: UTC+1 (CET)
  - Summer (DST): UTC+2 (CEST)
- Postal code: DK-4250 Fuglebjerg

Fuglebjerg is a town with a population of 2,321 (1 January 2026), in Næstved Municipality on Zealand in Region Sjælland in Denmark.

Fuglebjerg was the municipal seat of the former Fuglebjerg Municipality, until 1 January 2007.

== Landmarks ==
Fuglebjerg Church consists of a Romanesque nave and a late Gothic weapon house facing north. The tower dates back to 1838.

Fuglebjerggaard is a relative rare example of a Danish manor house situated in the middle of a village (town). The present main building dates from the middle of the 19th century. Another historic manor house, Førslevgaard, with a three-winged Baroque style main building from 1726, is located just southwest of the town.

== Fuglebjerg Municipality ==
Fuglebjerg Municipality was a municipality (Danish, kommune) in Vestsjælland County on the west the island of Zealand (Sjælland) in south Denmark. The municipality covered an area of 141 km^{2}, and had a total population of 6,582 (2005). Its last mayor was Henrik Willadsen, a member of the Venstre (Liberal Party) political party.

On 1 January 2007 Fuglebjerg Municipality ceased to exist as the result of Kommunalreformen ("The Municipality Reform" of 2007). It was merged with existing Fladså, Næstved, Holmegaard, and Suså municipalities to form the new Næstved Municipality. This created a municipality with an area of 681 km^{2} and a total population of 78,446 (2005).

== Notable people ==
- Finn Viderø (1906 in Fuglebjerg – 1987) a Danish organist, known for his recordings of classic organ works
