= Holmegaard =

Former municipality in Denmark

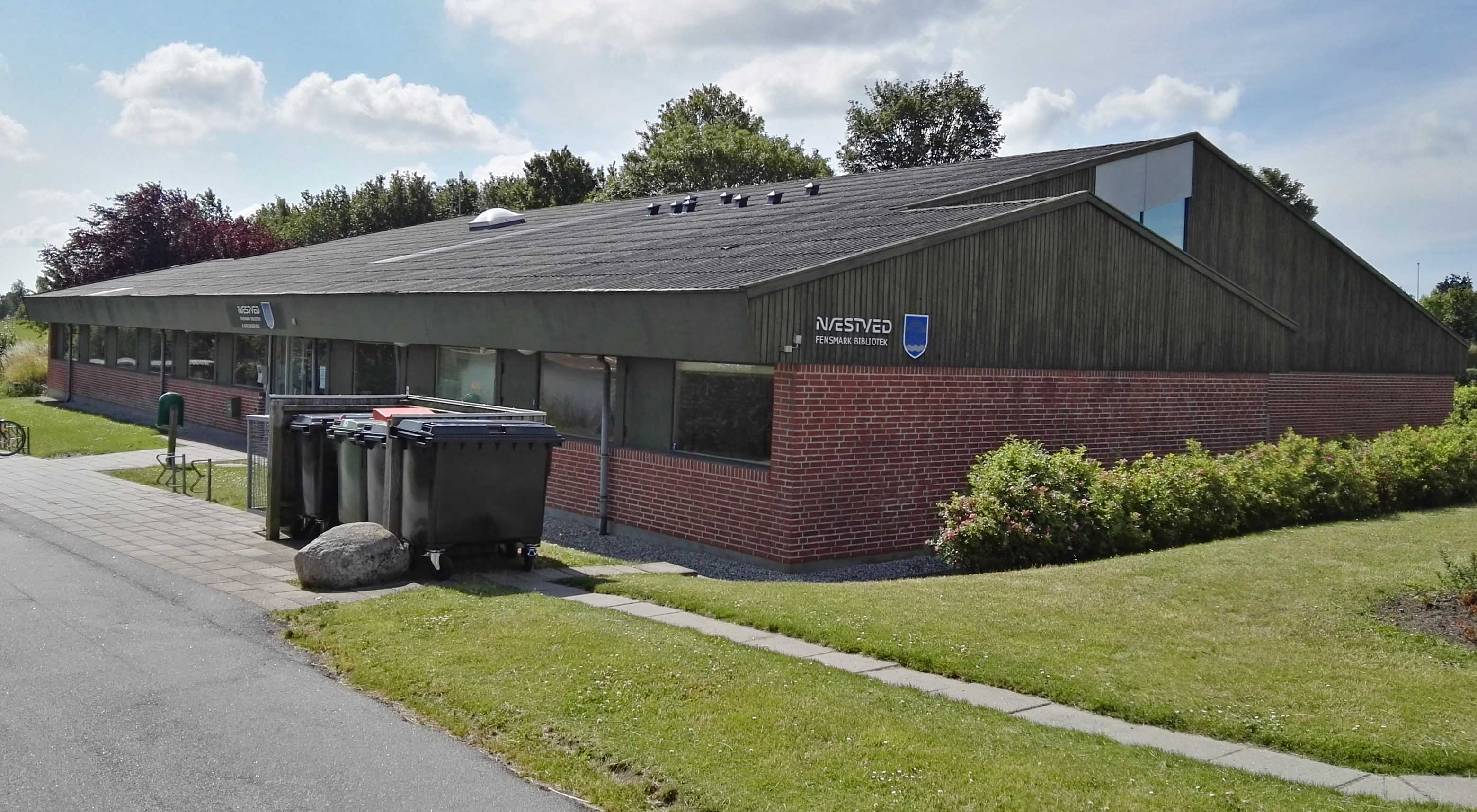
The former townhall of Holmegaard Municipality in Fensmark

Until 1 January 2007, Holmegaard Municipality (Danish: Holmegaard Kommune) was a municipality in Storstrøm County in the southern part of the island of Zealand (Sjælland) in south Denmark. The municipality covered an area of 66 km^{2}, and had a total population of 7,442 (2005). Its last mayor was Søren Dysted, a member of the Social Democrats (Socialdemokraterne) political party. The main town and the site of its municipal council was the town of Fensmark.

The municipality was created in 1966 when the following parishes were combined: Fensmark-Rislev Parish and Holme-Olstrup Parish. As the result of kommunalreform ("Municipality Reform") in 1970, Toksværd Parish was incorporated into Holmegaard municipality, and Rislev Parish was incorporated into Næstved municipality.

Holmegaard municipality ceased to exist as the result of Kommunalreformen ("The Municipality Reform" of 2007). It was merged with existing Fladså, Fuglebjerg, Næstved, and Suså municipalities to form the new Næstved municipality. This created a municipality with an area of 681 km^{2} and a total population of 78,446 (2005). The new municipality belongs to Region Sjælland ("Zealand Region").

== Holmegaard Glassworks ==
The home of famous Holmegaard Glassworks products is located in Fensmark. The company got its start in 1823 when Count Christian Danneskiold-Samsøe petitioned the Danish king for permission to build a glassworks at Holmegaards Mose ("Holmegaards Bog"). Today the company is known for its high-quality products of Danish design.
