= Rønnede =

- Town
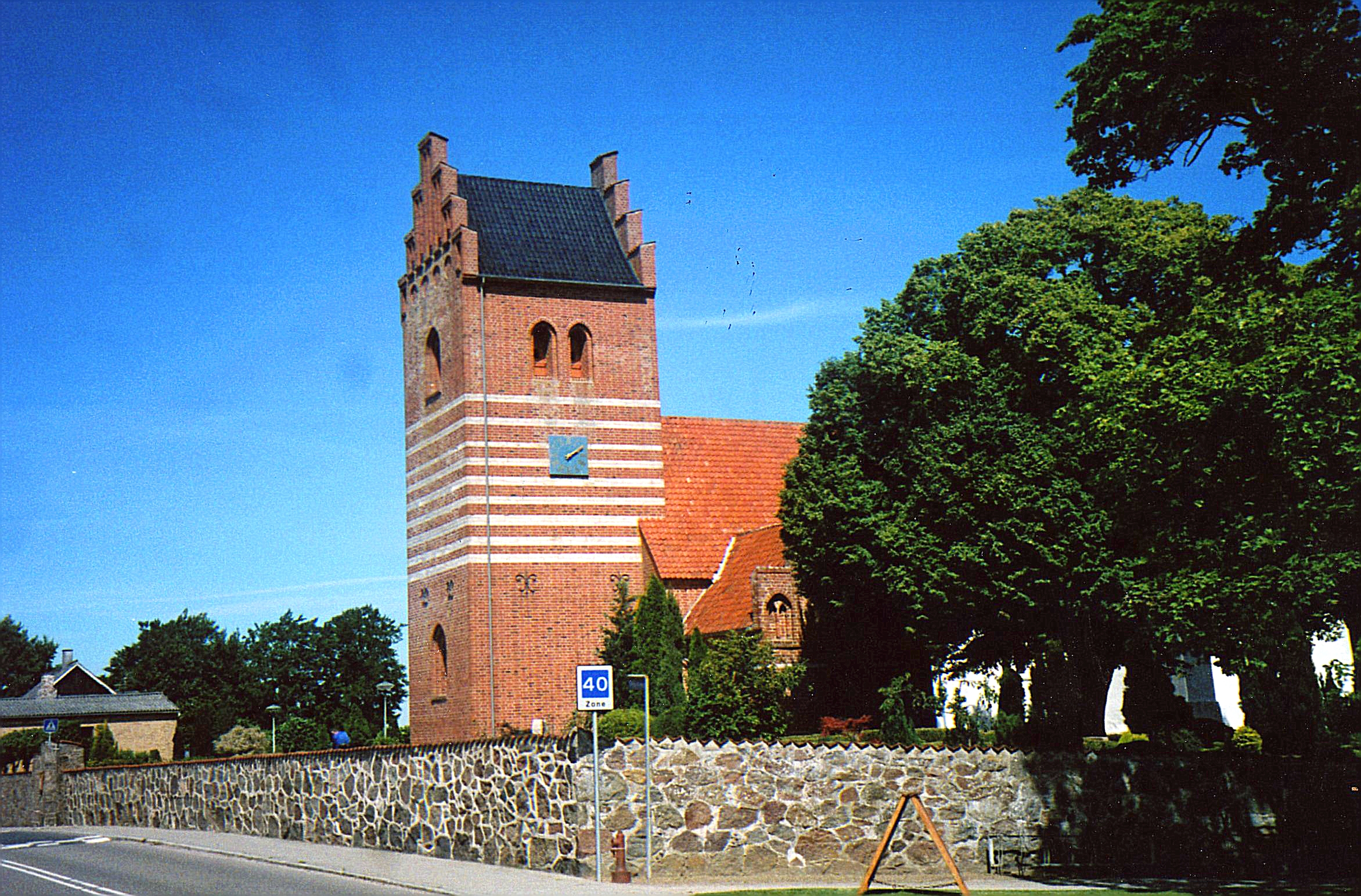
- Kongsted Church in Rønnede

- Location in Denmark Rønnede (Denmark Region Zealand)
- Coordinates: 55°15′27″N 12°1′13″E
- Country: Denmark
- Region: Zealand (Sjælland)
- Municipality: Faxe

Area
  - Urban: 2.1 km^{2} (0.81 sq mi)

Population (2026)
  - Urban: 2,969
  - Urban density: 1,400/km^{2} (3,700/sq mi)
- Time zone: UTC+1 (CET)
  - Summer (DST): UTC+2 (CEST)
- Postal code: DK-4683 Rønnede

Rønnede is a town in Faxe Municipality, in Region Zealand, Denmark. It is located just east of exit 37 at the European route E47 motorway, 25 km southwest of Køge, 6 km west of Faxe, 30 km northeast of Vordingborg and 19 km east of Næstved.

Prior to the Kommunalreformen ("The Municipality Reform" of 2007), Rønnede was the municipal seat of Rønnede Municipality.

== Kongsted Church ==
Kongsted Church is located in the former village of Kongsted now the southeastern part of Rønnede.

The church is known for its numerous murals, painted by the Kongsted Master and the Brarup Master in app. 1500.

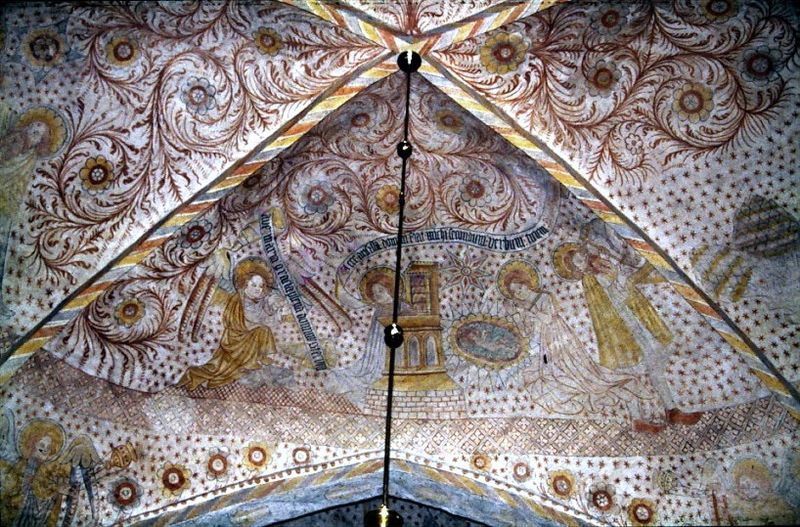

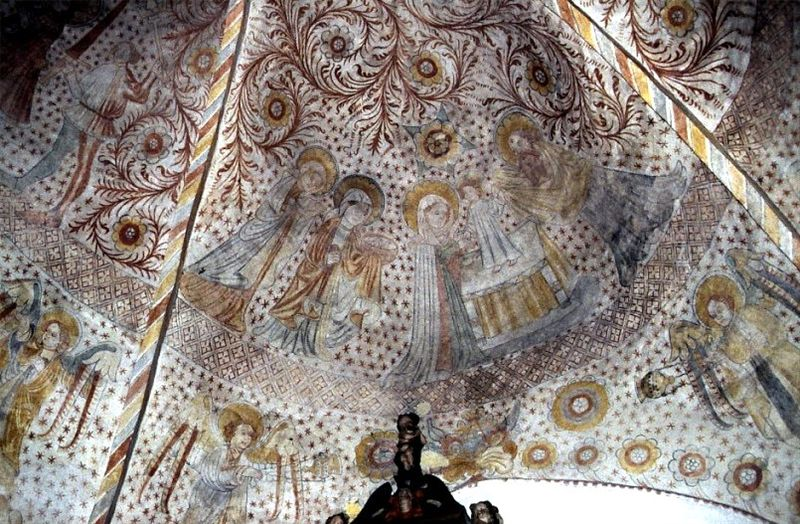
Murals in Kongsted Church

== Rønnede Inn ==
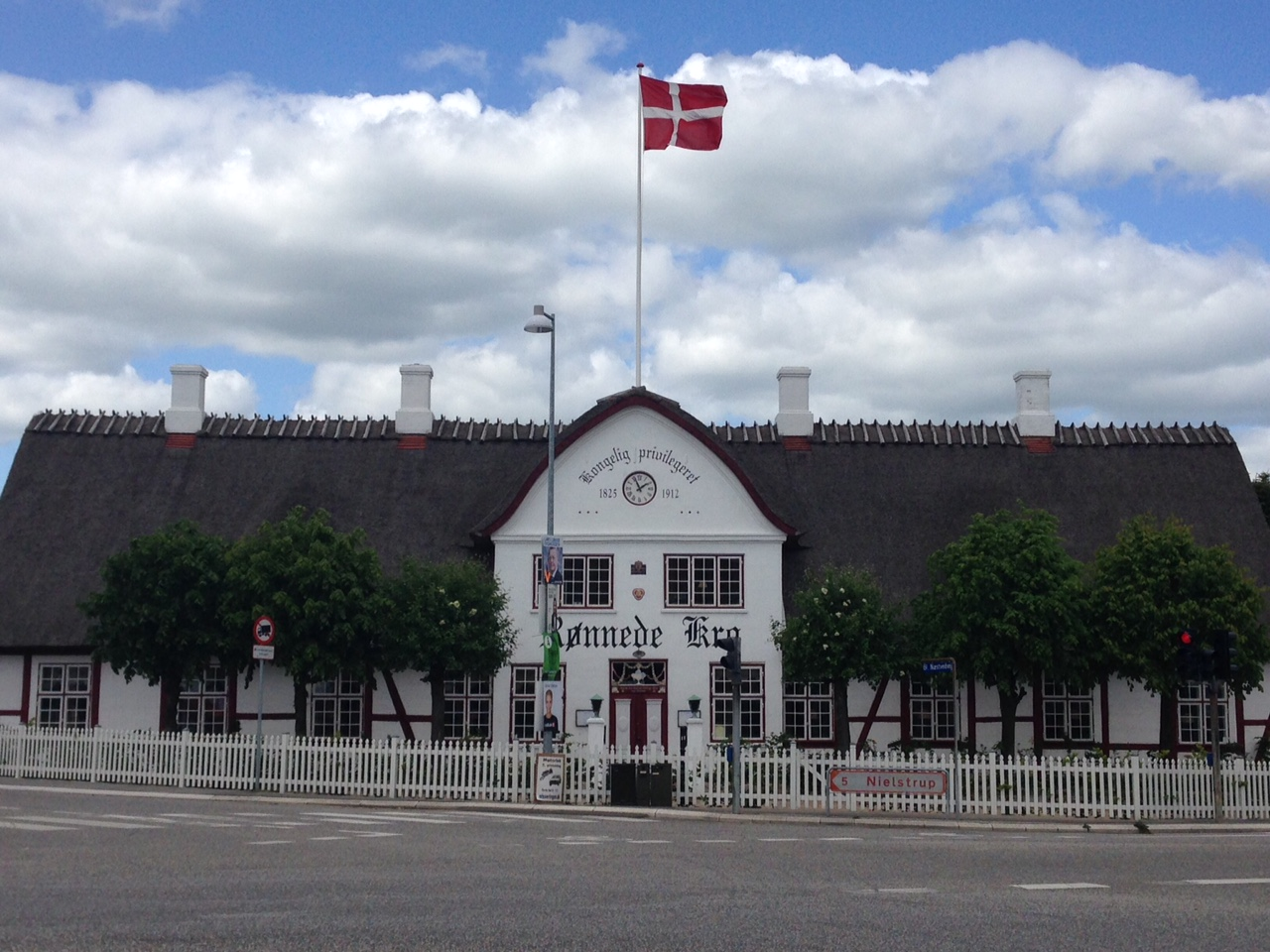
Rønnede Kro (Rønnede Inn)

Rønnede Kro (Rønnede Inn) from 1825, was constructed by Gisselfeld Monastery and had royal privileges. Therefore the inn was required to provide the serving of alcoholic beverages, accommodation for traveling guests, and the care of the riders' horses.

== Notable people ==
- Philip Smidth (1855 in Rønnede – 1938) a Danish architect of commercial properties, high-end apartment buildings, hotels and hospitals in the Historicist style
