= Mary Ann Beinecke Decorative Art Collection =

Research collection of art

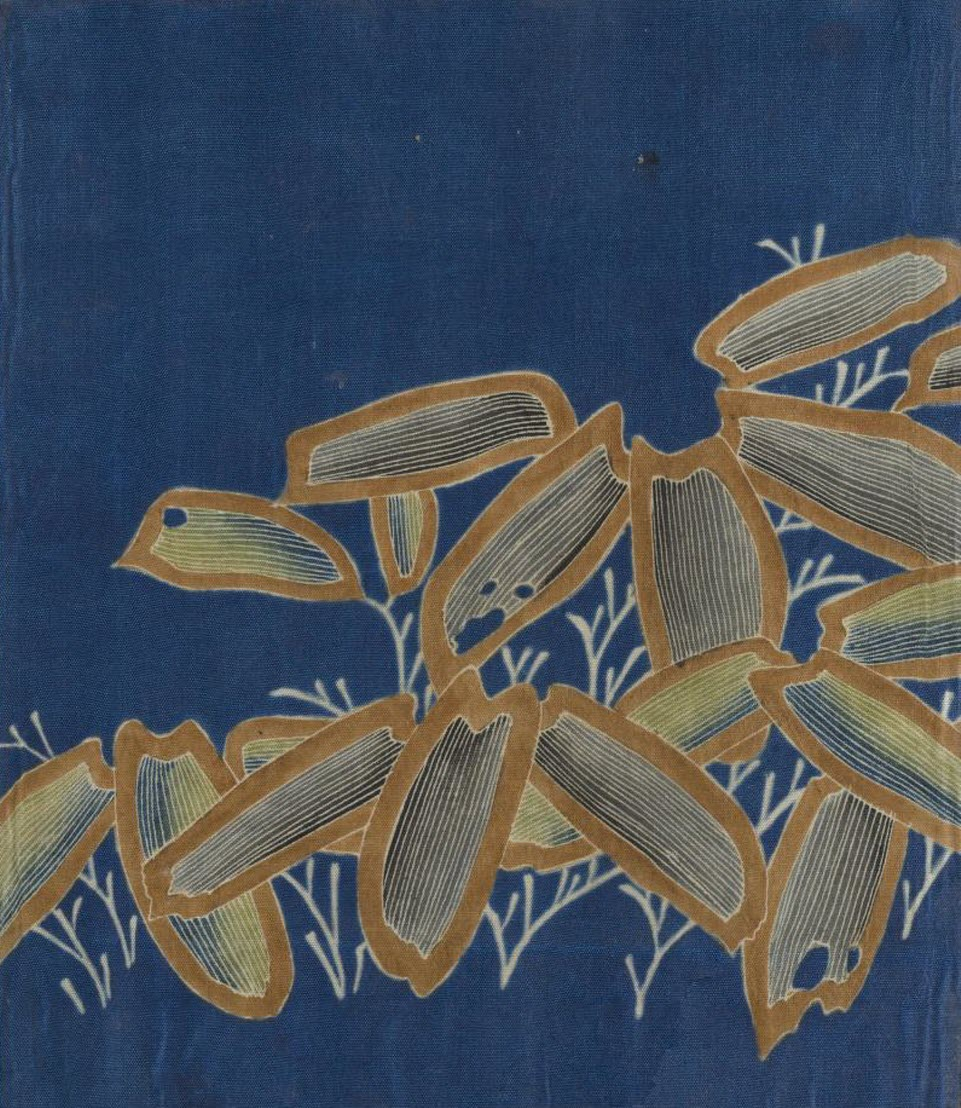
Reproduction of a Japanese decorated silk design from a book in the collection.

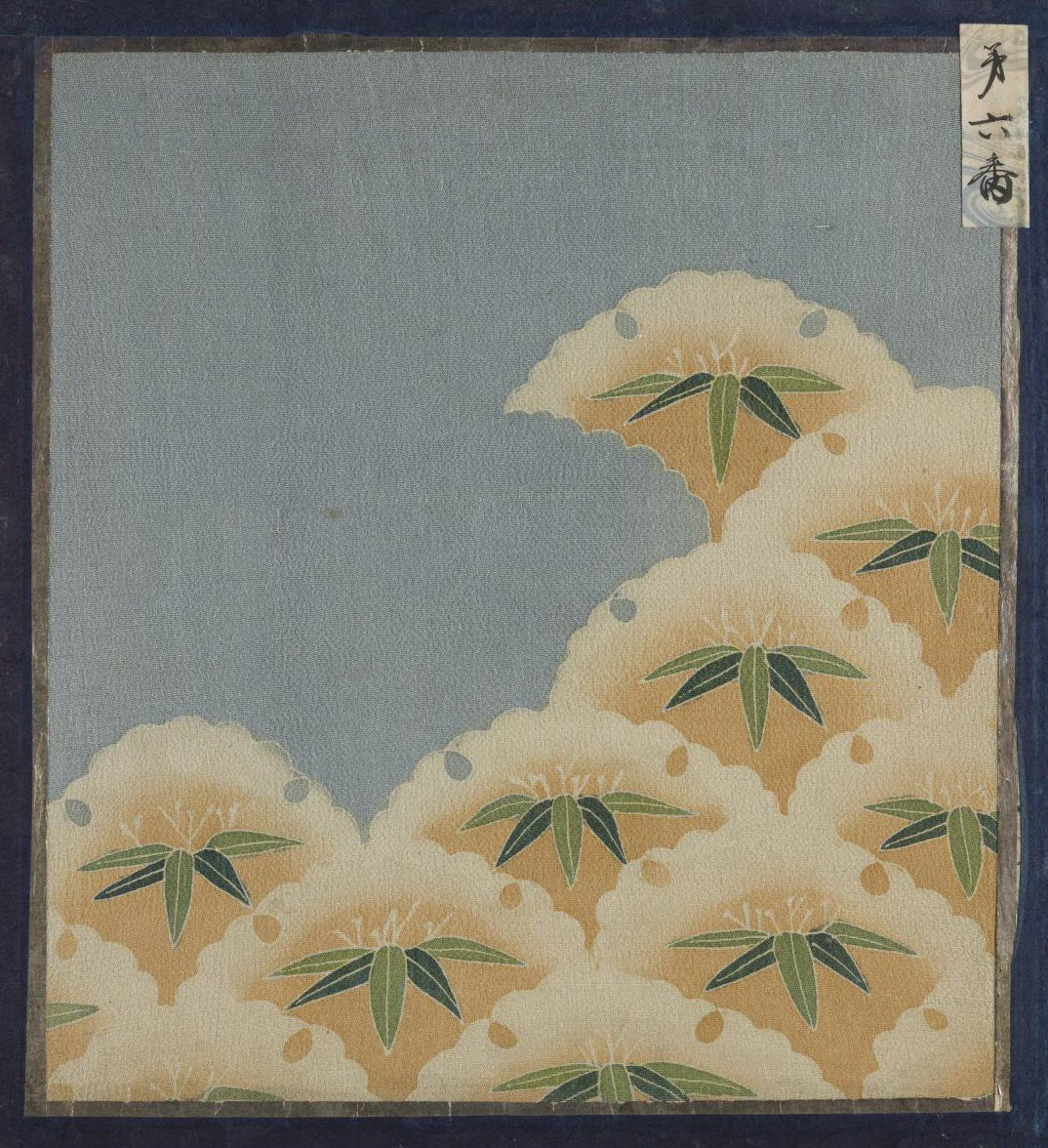
Reproduction of a Japanese decorated silk design from a book in the collection.

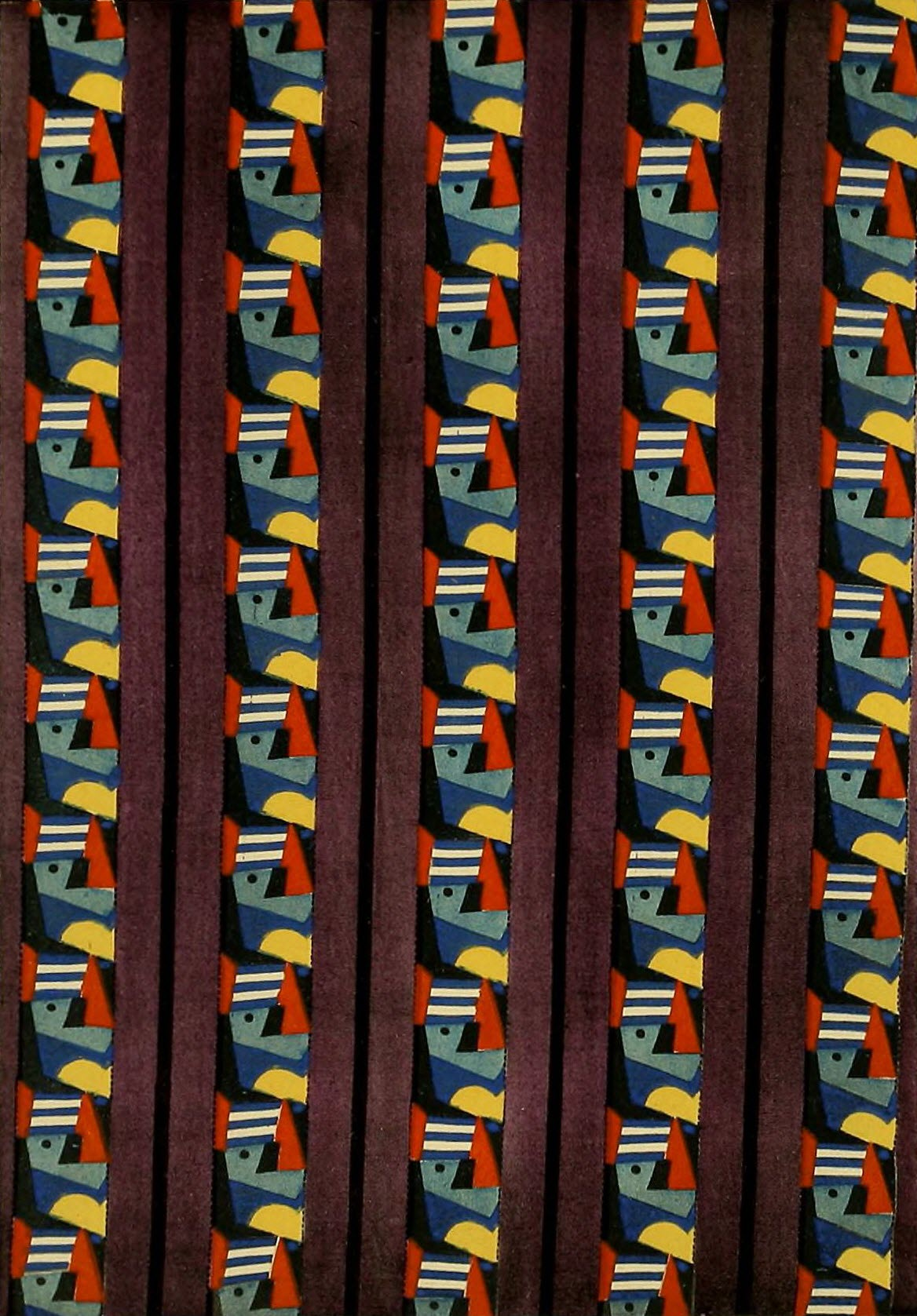
Colour plate from the book 'Étoffes imprimées et papiers peints' (1924) in the collection.

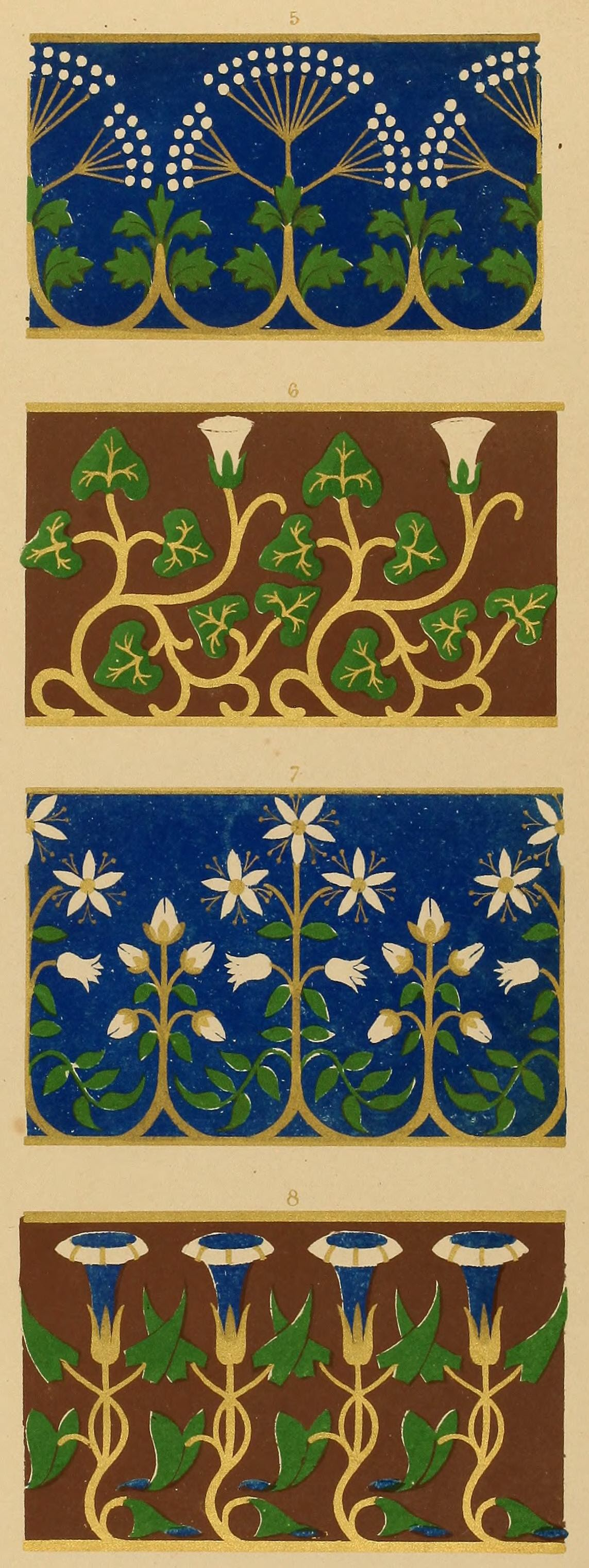
Colour plates from the book 'Floriated ornament: a series of thirty-one designs' (1849) in the collection.

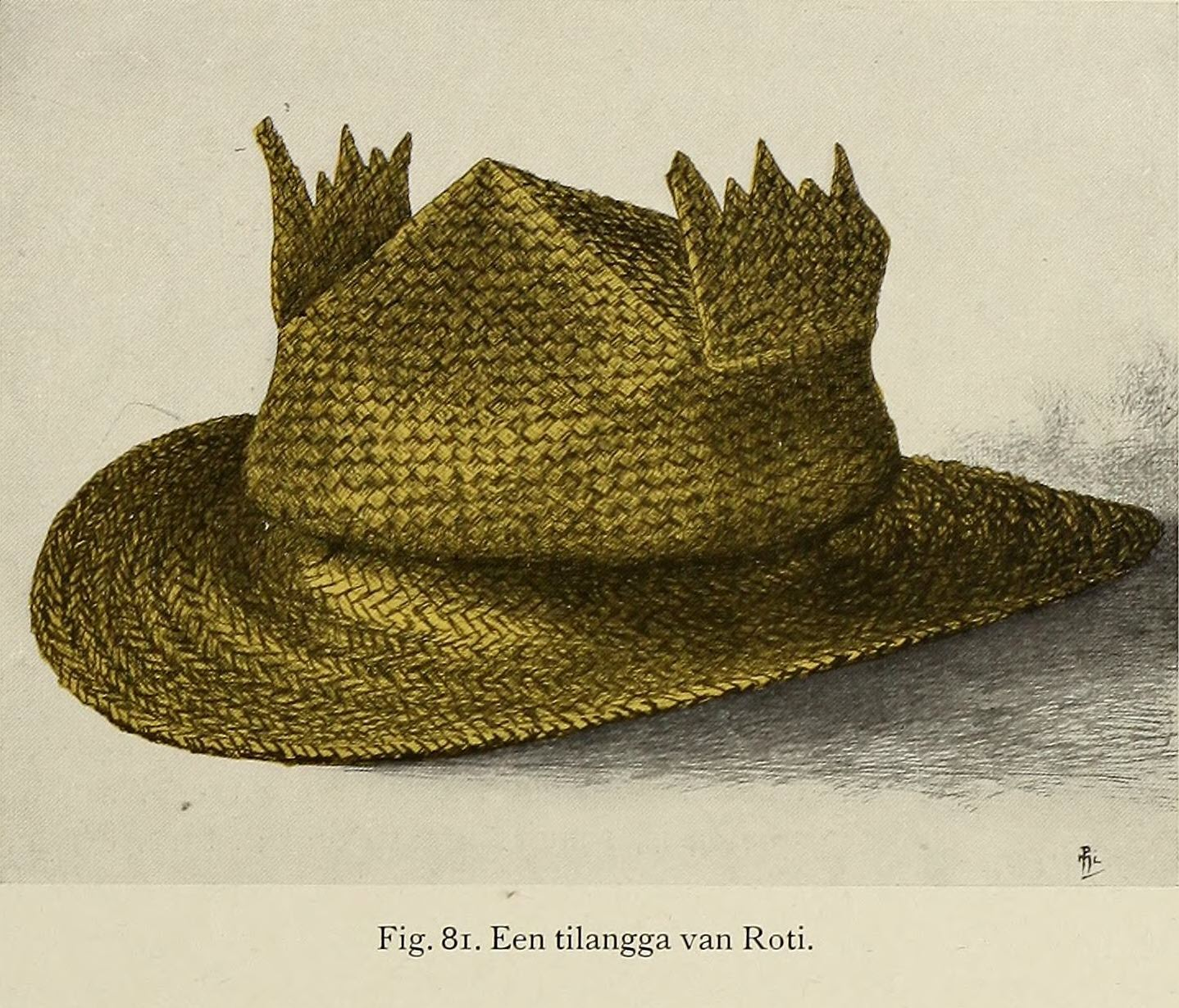
Colour plate from the book 'De inlandsche kunstnijverheid in Nederlandsch Indië (1912)' in the collection.

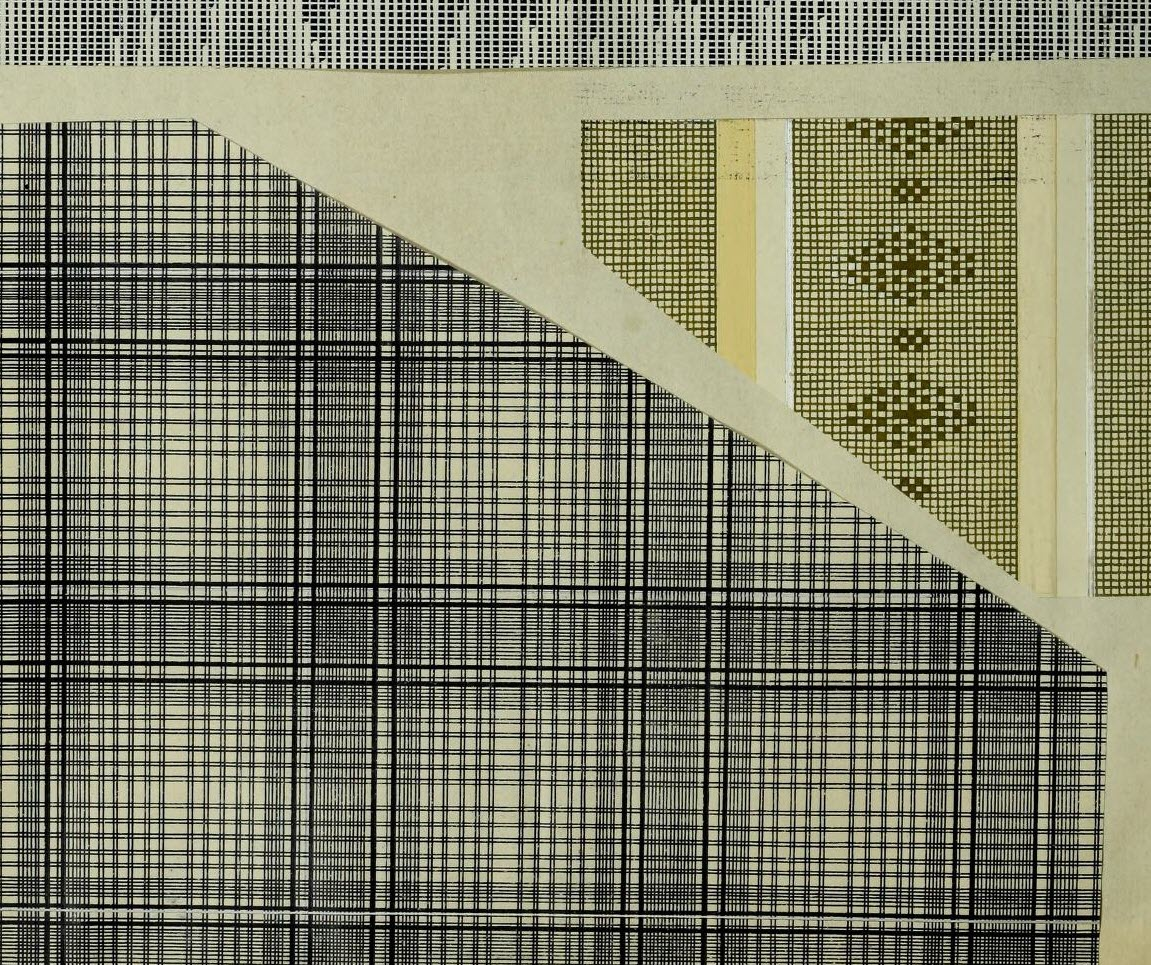
Mounted textile samples from the book 'Embroidery and textile designs' (1875) in the collection.

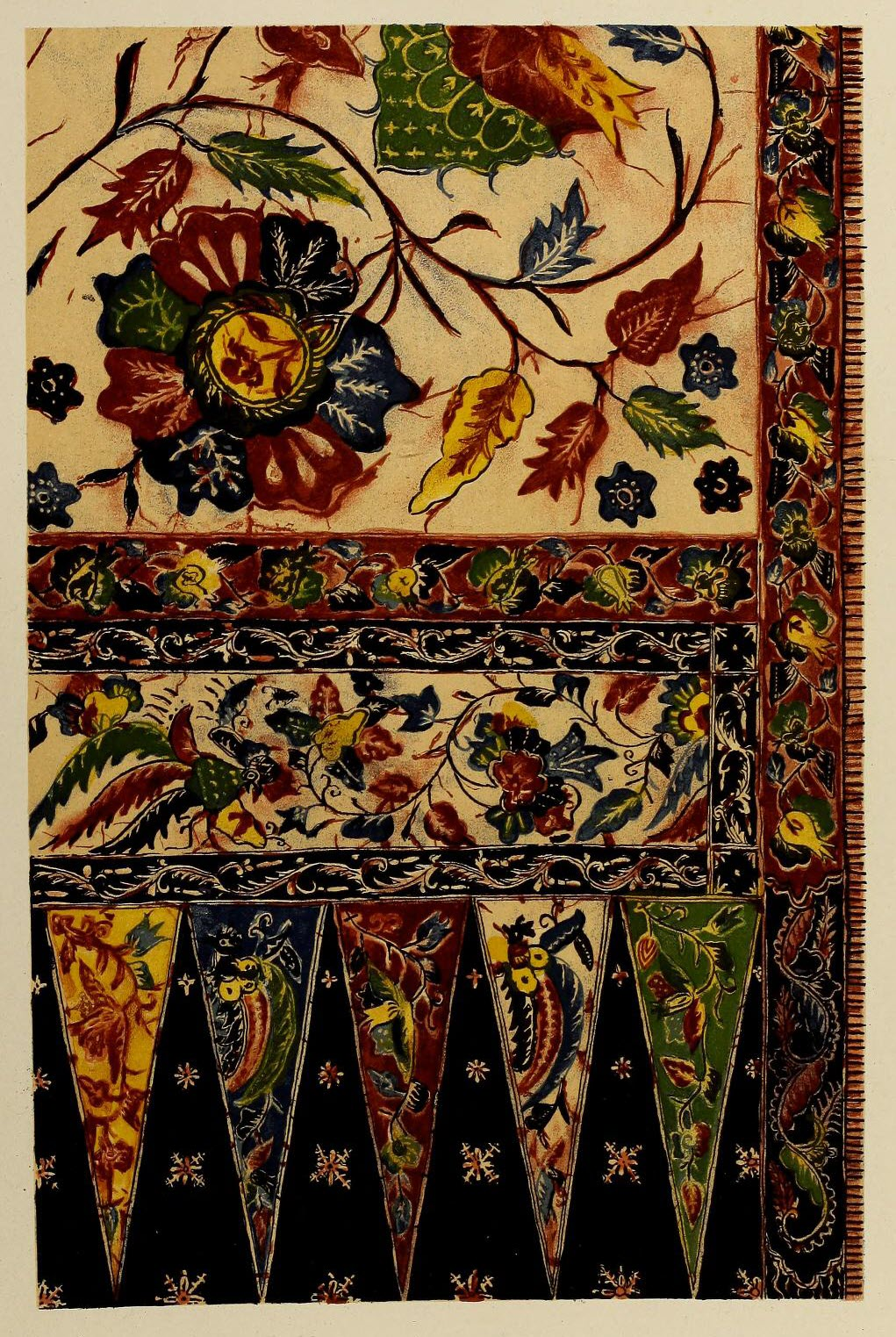
Colour plate from the book 'De inlandsche kunstnijverheid in Nederlandsch Indië' (1912) in the collection.

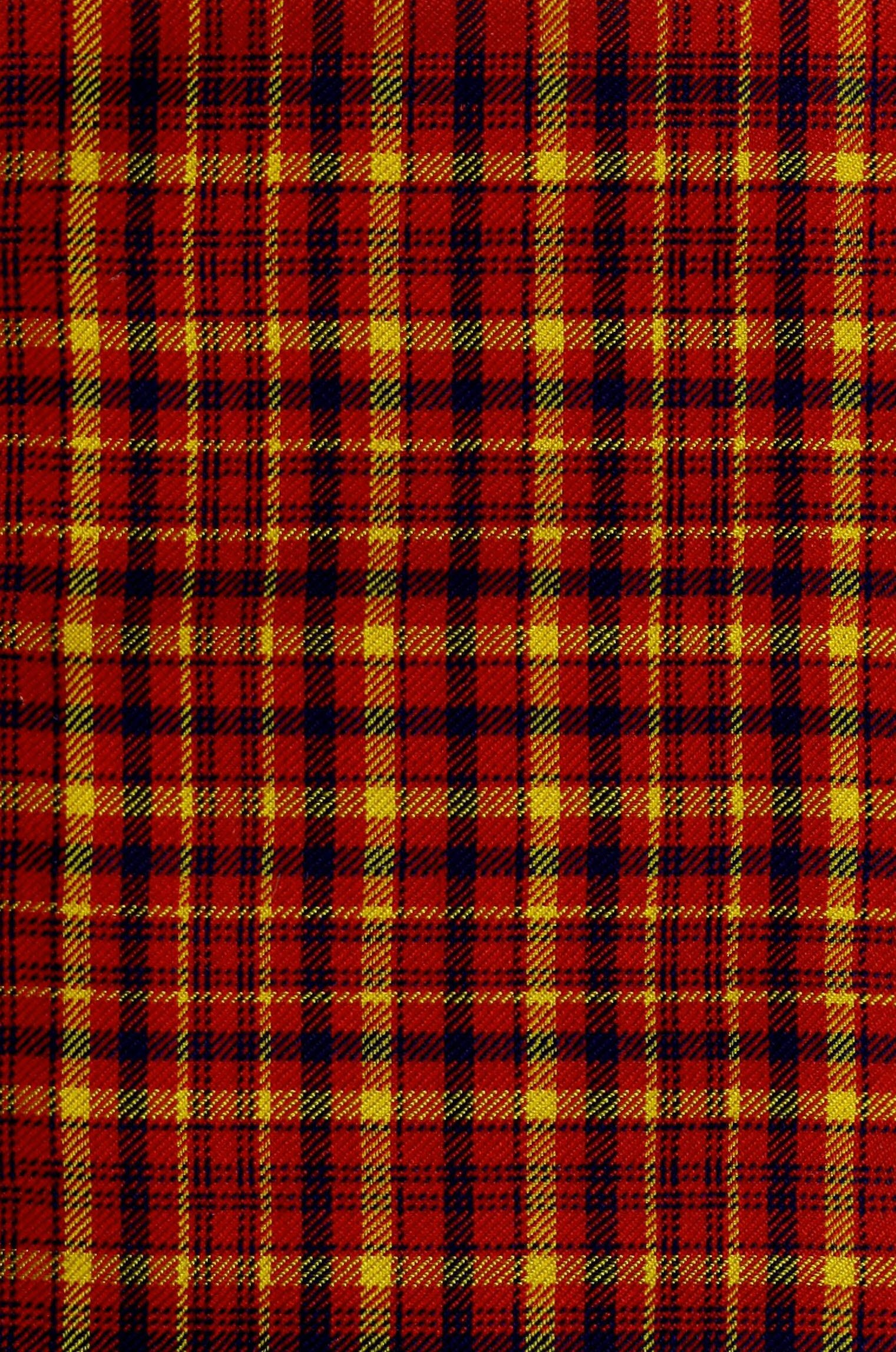
Mounted sample from the book 'Old and rare Scottish tartans, with historical introduction and descriptive notices' (1893) in the collection. Originally captioned: "From a plaid found on Culloden battlefield".

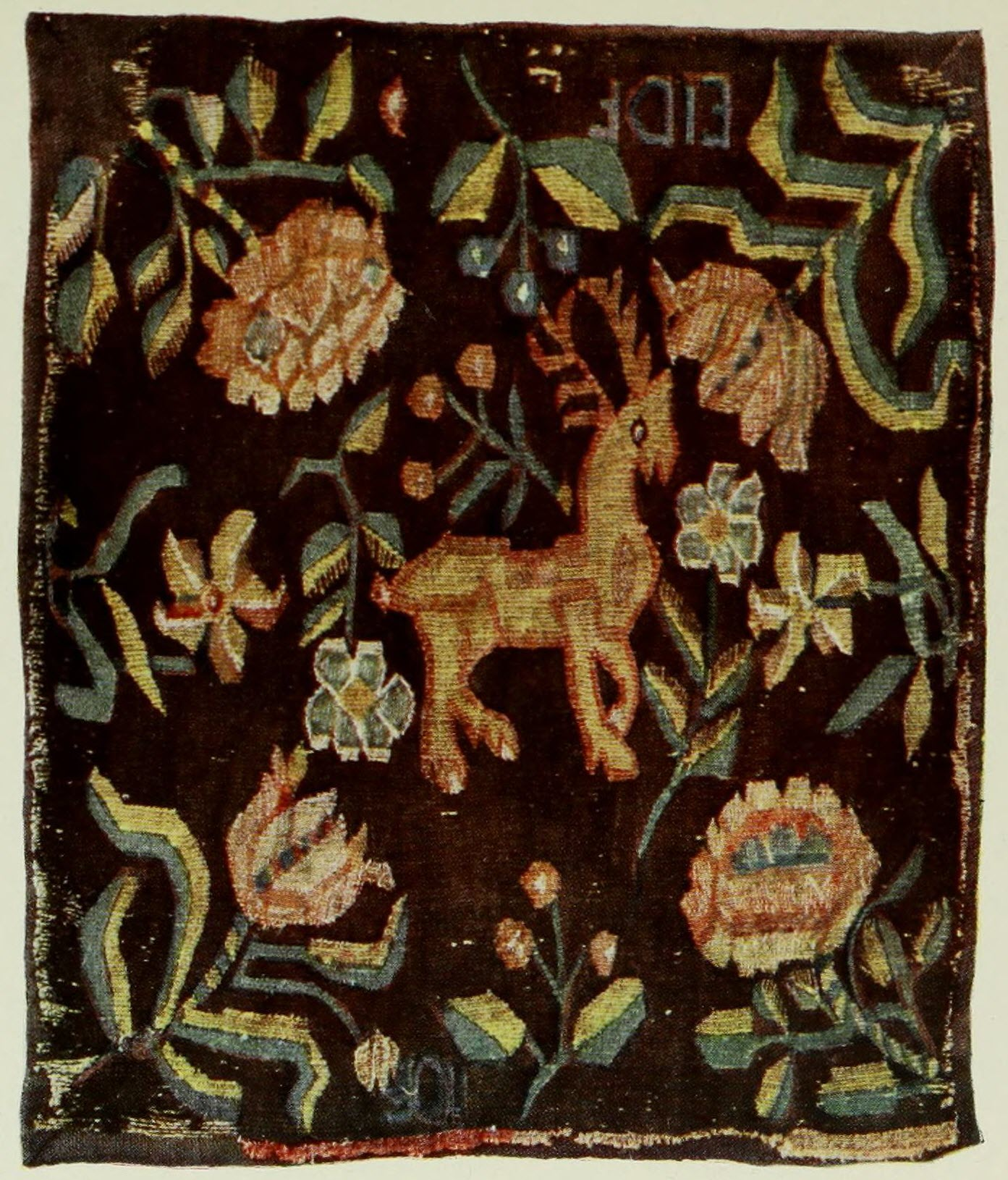
Reproduction of a chair cushion tapestry from the book 'Swedish textiles' (1925) in the collection.

The Mary Ann Beinecke Decorative Art Collection is a research collection of more than 1200 volumes on textiles and decorative art subjects, assembled by the weaver, textile artist and author Mary Ann Beinecke over the course of her career. It is currently held in the library of the Sterling and Francine Clark Art Institute (commonly referred to as the Clark).

The collection contains items from the period spanning 1550 to the 1970s, with focuses on costume history, handicrafts and textile design.

== Contents of the collection ==
The collection includes:

- numerous examples of French manufacturers’ sample books of fabrics, lace, ribbons and trims;
- treatises on textile production;
- dye manufacturers’ formula books;
- bound sets of fashion plates;
- sketchbooks of kimono patterns; and
- textile sample books offering examples of traditional Japanese design.

Illustrated interior decoration books offer glimpses into the trends of the late nineteenth century, and many volumes provide reference material on the history of subjects encompassing ink, wallpaper, handmade lace, carpet and rug making, and textile production. Crochet, knitting and needlework pattern books provide instruction and inspiration for hand work projects, while informing on the aesthetics of their time.

=== Notable texts in the collection ===
- Several early editions of Nathanael Lumscher's 'Weber Kunst-und Bild-Buch', alongside other rare 16th-, 17th-, and 18th-century weavers' pattern books.
- 'Sample Book of Trims', which contains many samples of elaborately-beaded appliques, metallic yarn embroidery, and woven ribbon trimmings.

== History ==
=== Creation ===
In the early 1960s, Mary Ann founded Nantucket Looms and then the Nantucket School of Needlery, the only licensed needle arts school in the US. The mission of the School was to train local young women in the needle arts, creating a form of employment which allowed them to have careers on the island as instructors in the resident School and teachers for the School's Nantucket School of Needlery Home Study Course, which Mary Ann wrote and illustrated in review with them. Support from the Nantucket Historic Trust provided pay and housing for professionals in the textile arts from all over the world to teach needlery at the resident classes. Workshops were offered year-round in subjects such as tapestry, weaving, vegetal dye, spinning, bobbin lace, and silk screen printing.

Mary Ann began her book collection as a personal research tool and source for her home study courses. The collection was acquired through working with rare book dealers who specialized in her textile and decorative art interests, and was housed and curated in a library at the School. When the School closed in the late 1970s, Mary Ann had moved to Williamstown, and the collection was too large to house at her home. In the interests of her continued research, and to ensure the entire collection was maintained in a single library available to scholars, the Clark library was selected as the recipient of the collection.

=== Digitization ===
In 1977, Mary Ann donated the collection to the Clark library. The library later digitized 408 volumes from the collection, making them freely accessible for research. Volumes included in the digitization project were selected for their rarity, fragility and structural complexity. The digitized collection is supported in The Clark Digital Collections. The years-long digitization project was completed with federal funding from a grant by the Institute of Museum and Library Services and with funding through the federal Library Services and Technology Act.

== Textual excerpts from the collection ==
=== Notes on the Royal School of Needlework ===
"The Decorative Needlework of which so much has been said and written, of late, is a revival of old-time industries. Begun in London in 1872, this conjuration of forgotten needlecraft was chiefly due to the exertions of a lady moved to pity by the sad fate of a young governess who was found drowned in the Thames, desperate after a long struggle for livelihood in the only career open to her. The idea of creating a school for needlework of the higher ornamental class, thus prompted, has directed into a new channel the efforts of many women disqualified, by delicate health or for other reasons, for self-support by occupations requiring long continued exertion, mental or physical.

The Royal School of Art Needlework, first established in a small room over a shop in a side-street, is today a prominent institution, occupying permanent quarters at South Kensington. Specimens of antique embroidery, with their beautiful designs and multiplicity of stitches, are there restored or imitated, to decorate the upper class households of modern England; while the new designs of contemporaneous artists are constantly employed in the production of such examples as those made generally known in America by the Centennial Exhibition in 1876." – Woman's handiwork in modern homes (1881)

=== Indonesian material culture ===
The series "De inlandsche kunstnijverheid in Nederlandsch Indië" by J. E. Jasper and Mas Pirngadi describes the material culture of the former Dutch East Indies (present-day Indonesia) and was first published in 1912. Part I deals with wicker work, basket weaving, and plaiting; Part II focuses on weaving, and Part III covers batik. The drawings by Mas Pirngadi are in color.

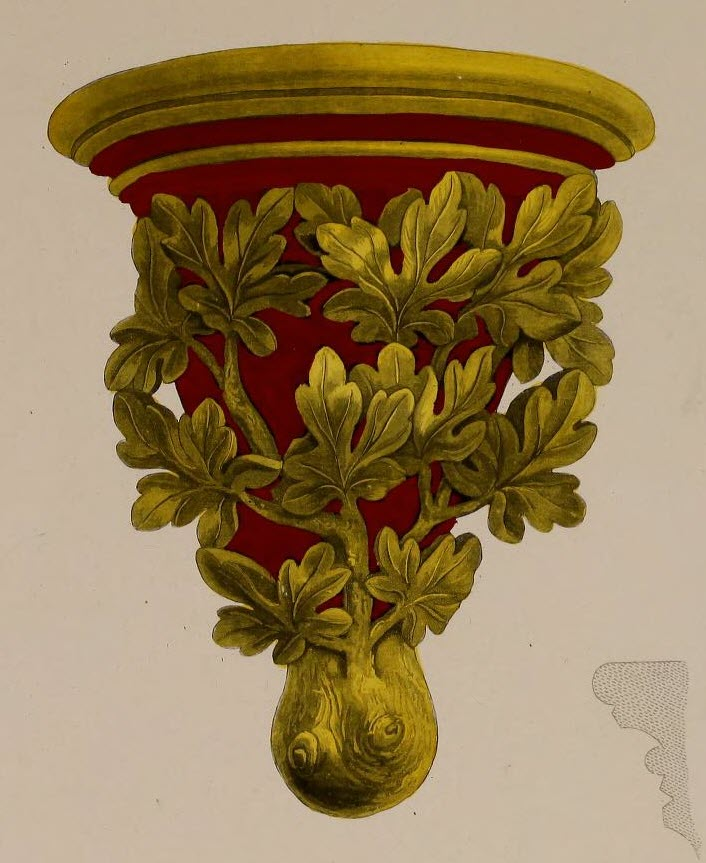
From the book 'The encyclopædia of ornament' (1842) in the collection.

Notes on the illustrator: "Raden Mas Pirgadie was born in Banyumas, west Java, possibly in 1875. As he was from an aristocratic family, he had contact with Dutch residents of the Netherlands East Indies (Indonesia) including the artist F.J. Du Chattel (1856–1917), who taught him to paint with watercolours in 1889. Pirngadie was a very skilled and accurate draftsman, and made illustrations for J.E. Jasper’s monograph on traditional arts and crafts of the Netherland East Indies that was published in 1912. From 1928, he worked for many years at the Bataviasch Genootschap van Kunsten en Wetenschappen (Batavia Society of Arts and Sciences, now the Museum Nasional) in Batavia (Jakarta). He also designed airmail postage stamps for the Post en Telegraafdienst (Post and Telegraph Services) of the Netherlands east Indies in 1931. He died in Batavia in 1936.

Pirngadie was a master of Western art techniques and produced naturalistic landscapes, portraits of people, and scenes of folk life. For the artist, the realistic technique was most suitable to express the beauty and images of things around him. His style of portraiture gave prominence to showing the accuracy of form, proportion and character of the object. These qualities made a portrait painting successful, standards which had a strong influence on the next generation of Indonesian artists." – MAS PIRNGADIE (c. 1875–1936)

=== The furniture designs of Thomas Hope and George Smith ===
"After Thomas Hope’s publications George Smith’s Collection of Designs is probably the most important and influential work on design and decoration of the Regency period both in Britain and America. It is evident that George Smith must have had either fairly accurate drawings or personal knowledge of the Duchess Street interiors and furnishings. ‘Hope's designs were put into general circulation by George Smith, the author of a pattern book which quickly followed Hope's publication and had practically the same title: A Collection of Designs for Household Furniture and Interior Decoration, 1808. Little so far is known about Smith’s career. He was a practising craftsman who claimed, without justification it seems, to be upholsterer to the Prince of Wales. There is certainly much emphasis on upholstery in his book, a concession to the growing interest in this branch of interior decoration which was largely due to the increasing output of materials from the factories. This was to be of importance for furniture design, not only in the attempt to relate curtains and window cornices to the various styles which were beginning to affect furniture but also in the thicker padding which was being applied to seats of all kinds with consequent influence on their design’ (Frances Collard, Thomas Hope’s Furniture, in: Thomas Hope, Yale, 2008).

‘Smith took over many of the classical features of Hope's designs. He makes great use of animal monopodia on a variety of pieces, tables, sideboards, chairs and sofas, for instance, of double lotus leaves meeting centrally in legs and stretchers, of winged feet on tables and cabinets, of console supports on tables and seats, and of varied fashionable decorative ornaments such as stars and bolt heads. His chairs in general adopt the straight lines which were considered to have been the distinguishing mark of ancient furniture, thus failing to continue the use of contrasting curves which were such an attractive feature of the ‘Trafalgar’ chair. His Household Furniture undoubtedly kept classical types of furniture very much alive, as did the reissue of Tatham’s Etchings in 1810. But Smith could not possibly match the scholarship which gave precision to many of Hope's designs. ‘Smith also paid great attention to Gothic designs; indeed his book of 1808 presents more illustrations of this style than any previous publication. He claims that Gothic produced ‘a more abundant variety of ornaments and forms than can possibly be obtained in any other style’, and he proceeds to apply his Gothic decoration to every kind of furniture. Herein the fundamental error of designing furniture in historical revivals becomes clear.

Smith's designs are not Gothic at all; they simply show furniture of current fashionable forms with the addition of Gothic ornament - pierced quatrefoils, crockets, pinnacles, pointed arches, etc. copied from medieval buildings The work was published as a complete volume in boards sometime in 1807 for £4 14s 6d or as here ‘elegantly coloured’ at £7 17s 6d. The British Critic for March 1806 advertises the issue in parts each containing 50 plates price £1 11s 6d each, plain; or elegantly coloured, £2. 12s 6d.’ The first group of 50 plates dated Dec. 1st 1804; the second group of 50 dated July 1st 1805 with the remaining plates dated Dec. 1st 1806 and Jan. 1st 1807. The first part with the most Hopean designs was clearly available by 1805 and thus prior to Hope’s own publication and not after as the title-page would seem to indicate." – Marlborough bibliography

See: Joy, E. Pictorial Dictionary of British 19th century Furniture Design, 1977; Frances Collard Thomas Hope's Furniture in Thomas Hope Yale University Press, 2008; Abbey Life 71

== Media from the collection ==
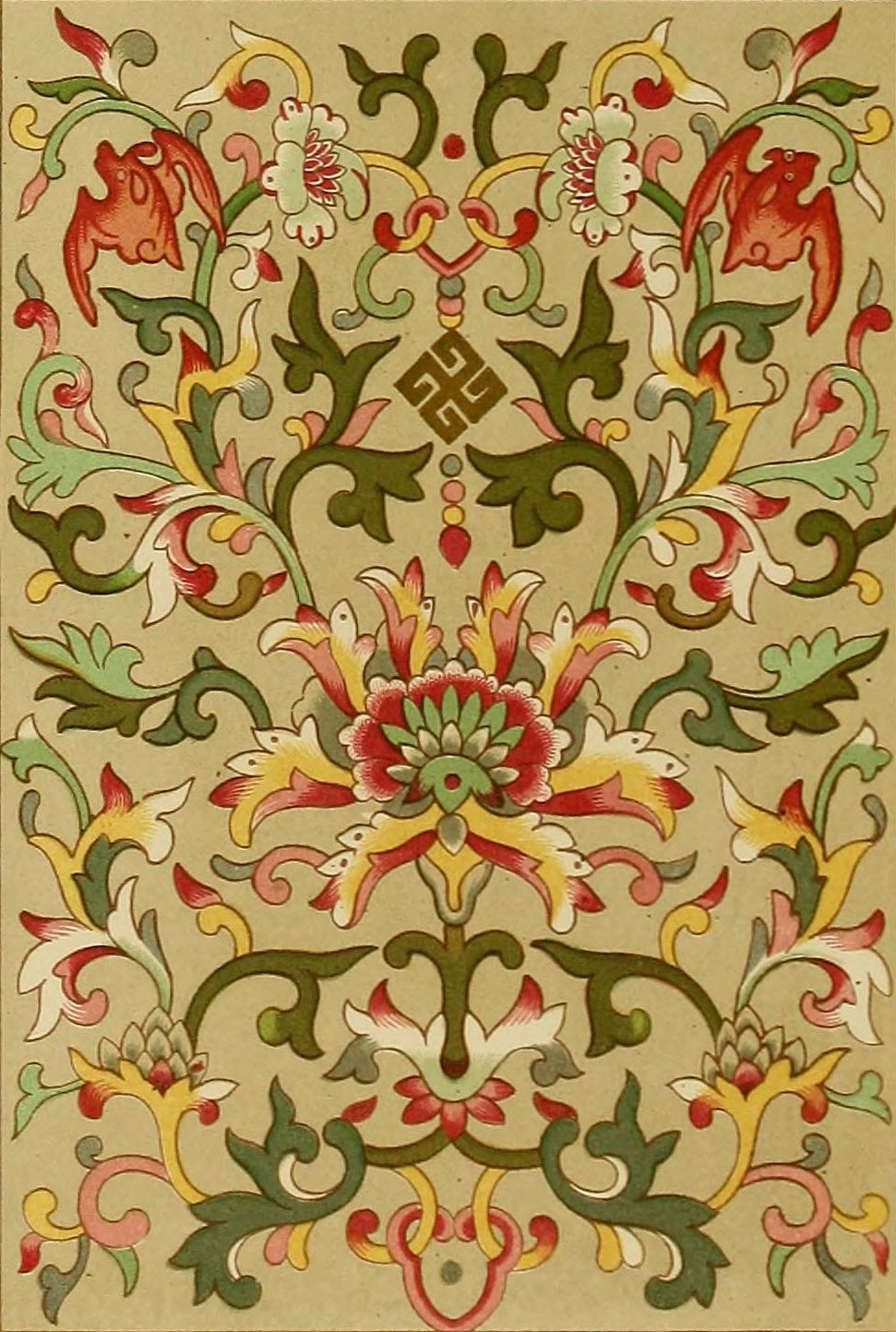
From 'Examples of Chinese ornament selected from objects in the South Kensington museum and other collections' (1867)

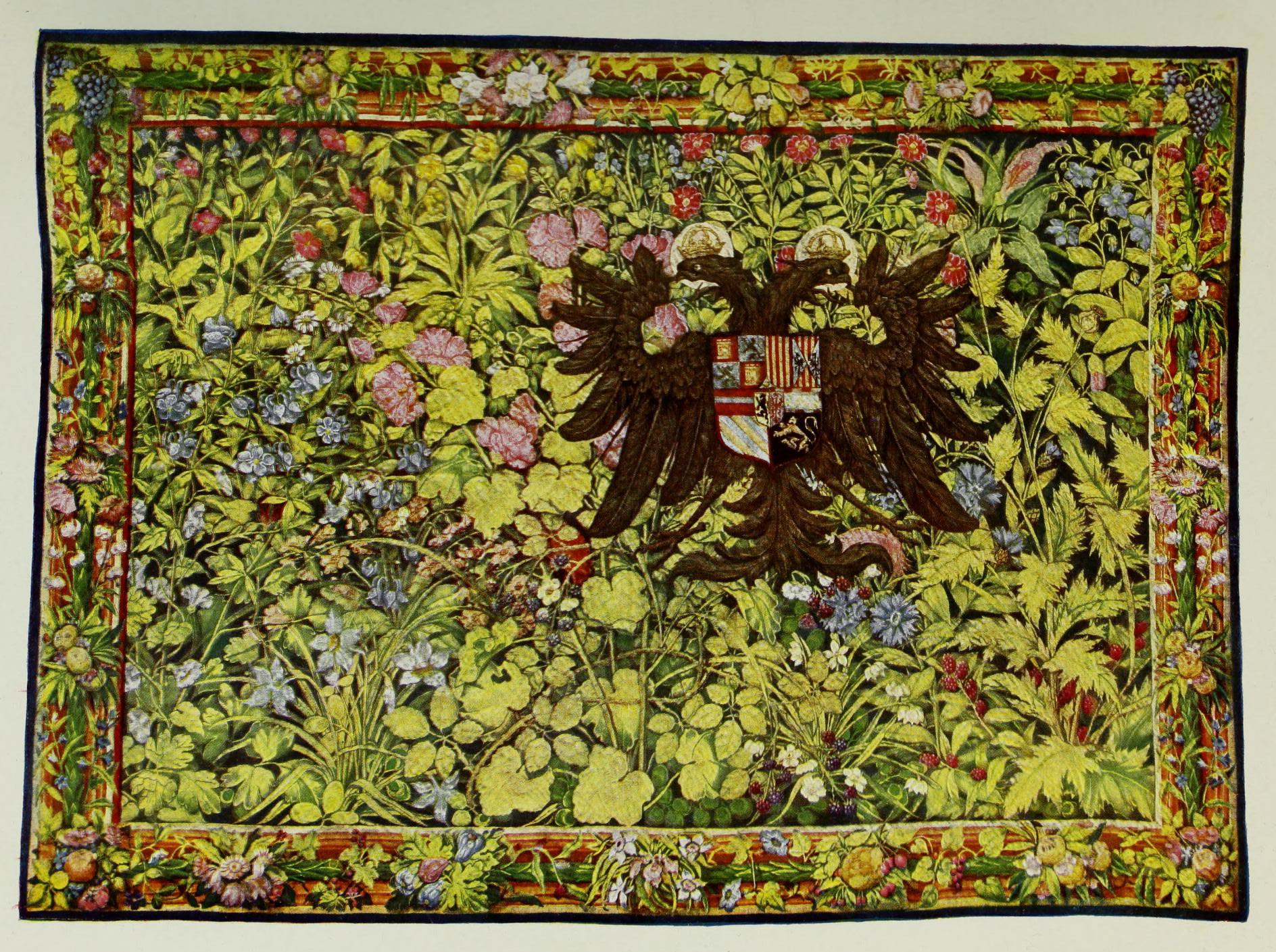
From 'The tapestries of the Vienna imperial court' (1922)

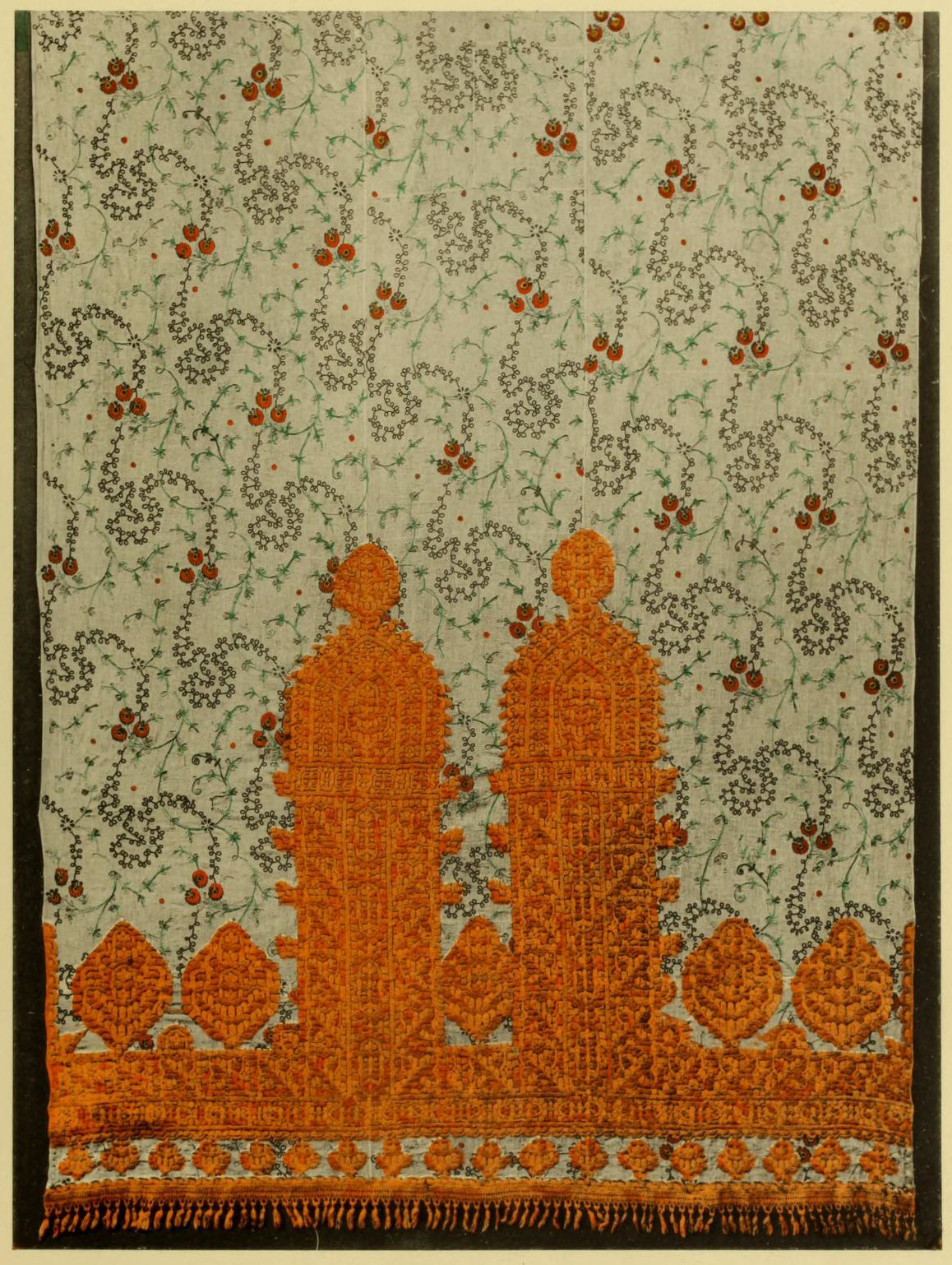
From 'La décoration marocaine; cinquante-quatre planches accompagnées d'une préface et d'une table descriptive' (1924)

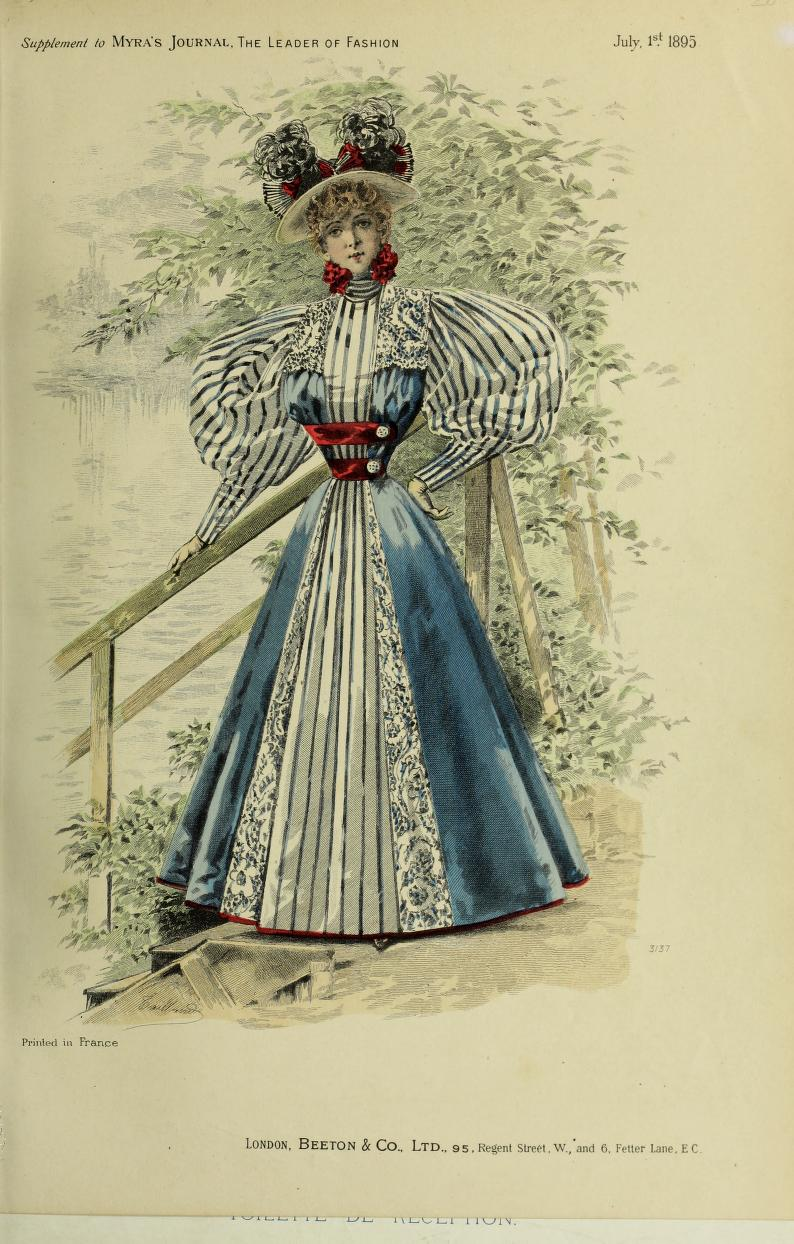
Supplement, Latest Paris fashions, presented to the subscribers to the Queen (1877) Page 059

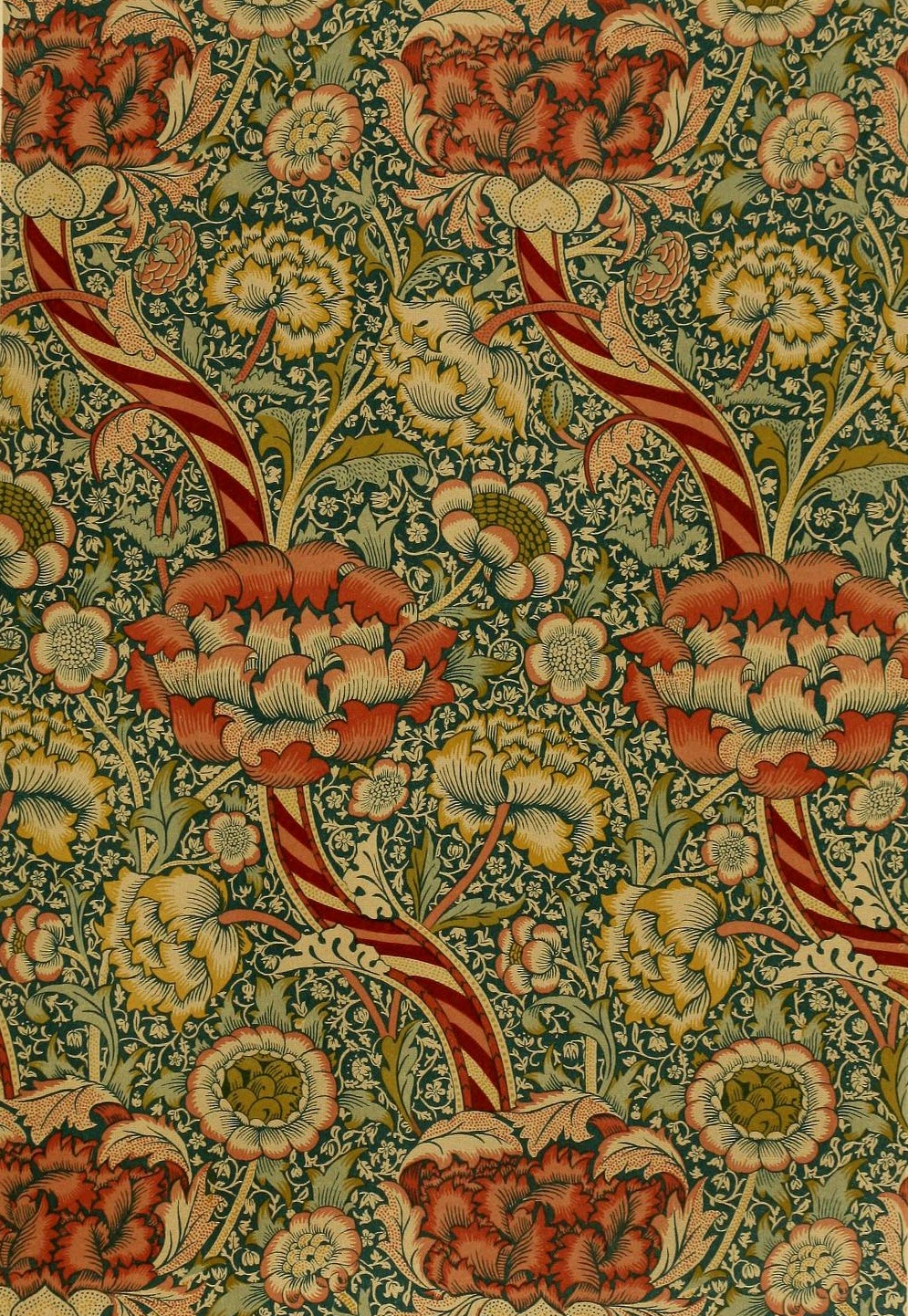
From 'The art of William Morris' (1897)

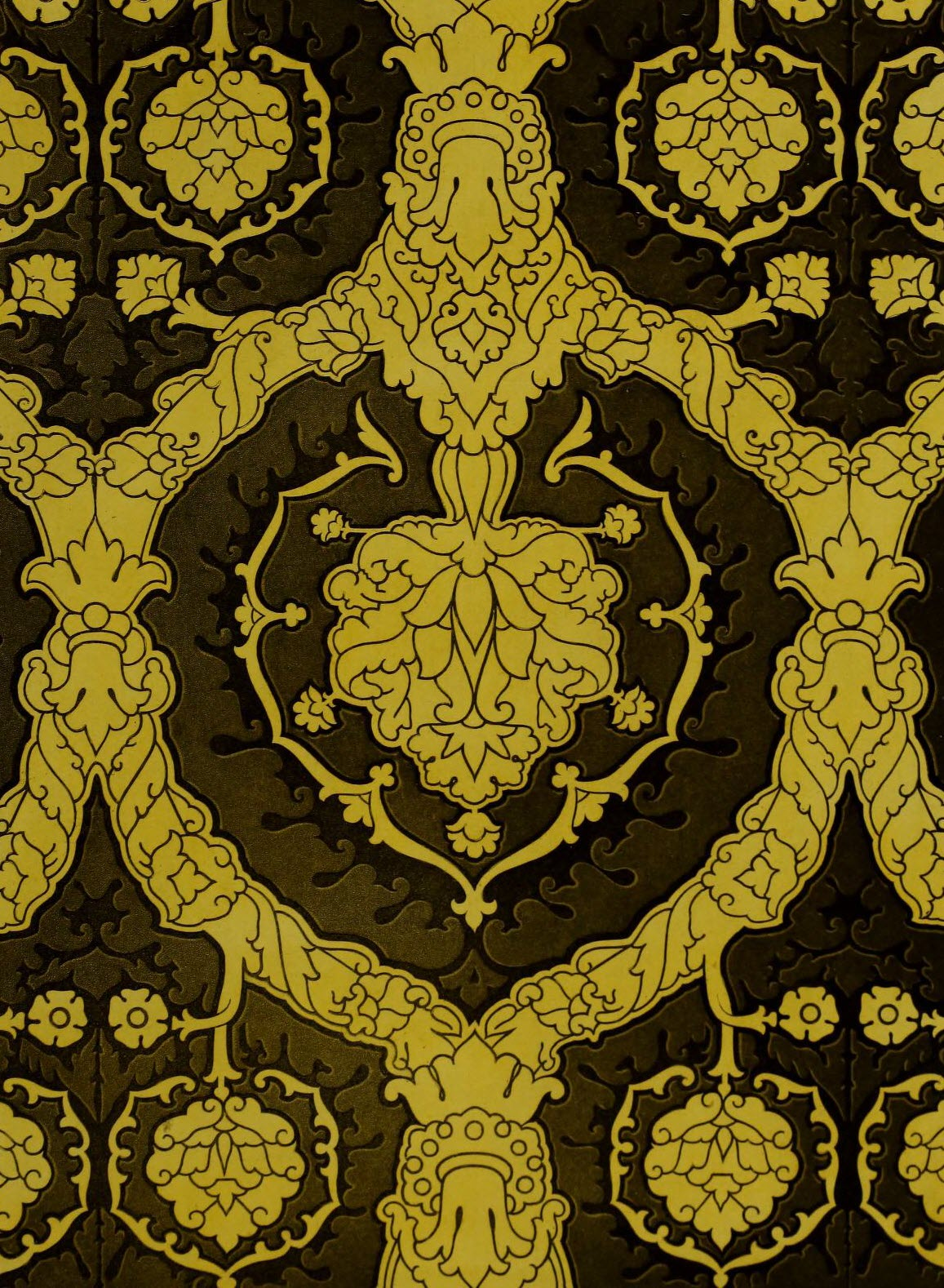
Colour plate from 'The encyclopædia of ornament' (1842).

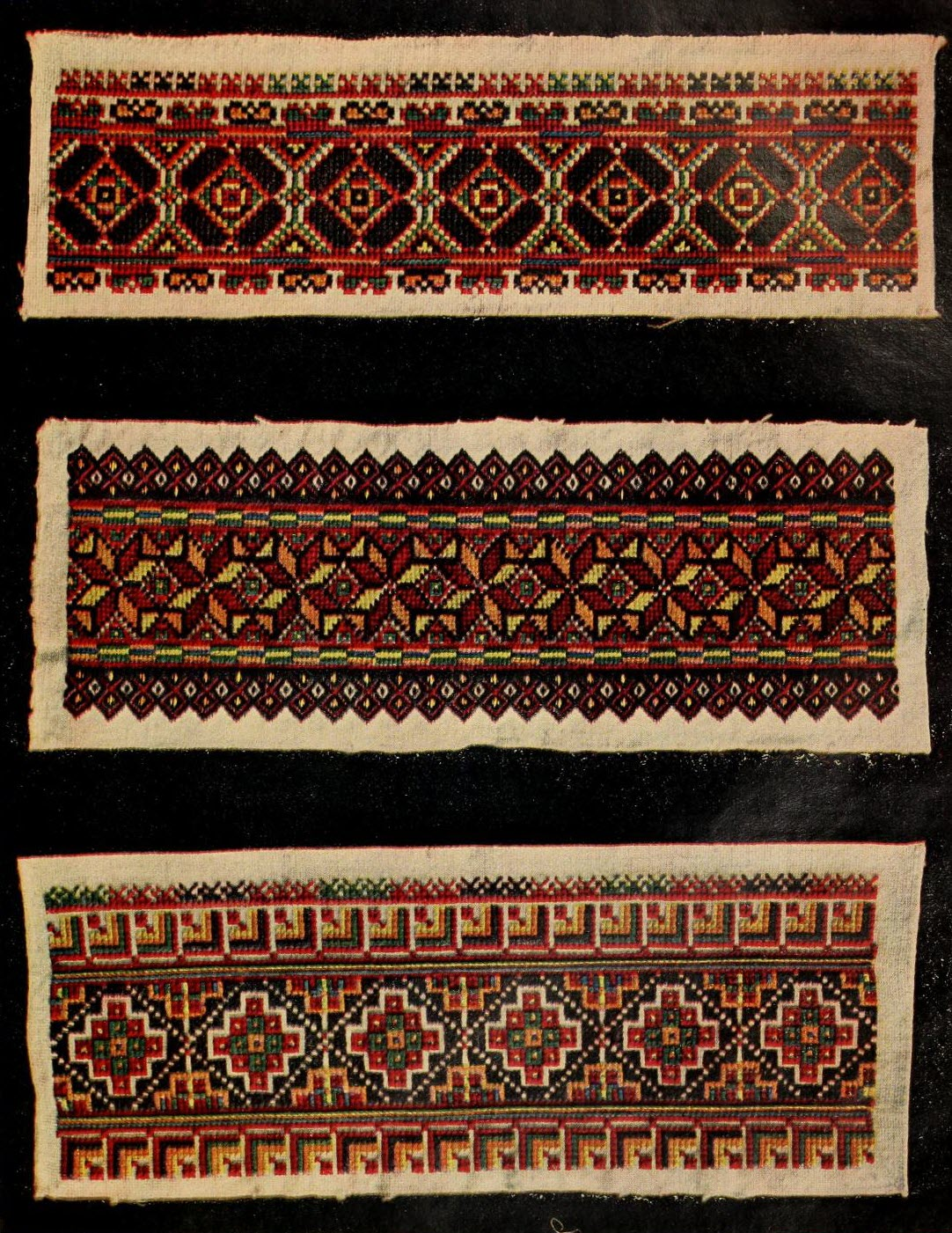
From 'Peasant art of subcarpathian Russia' (1926)

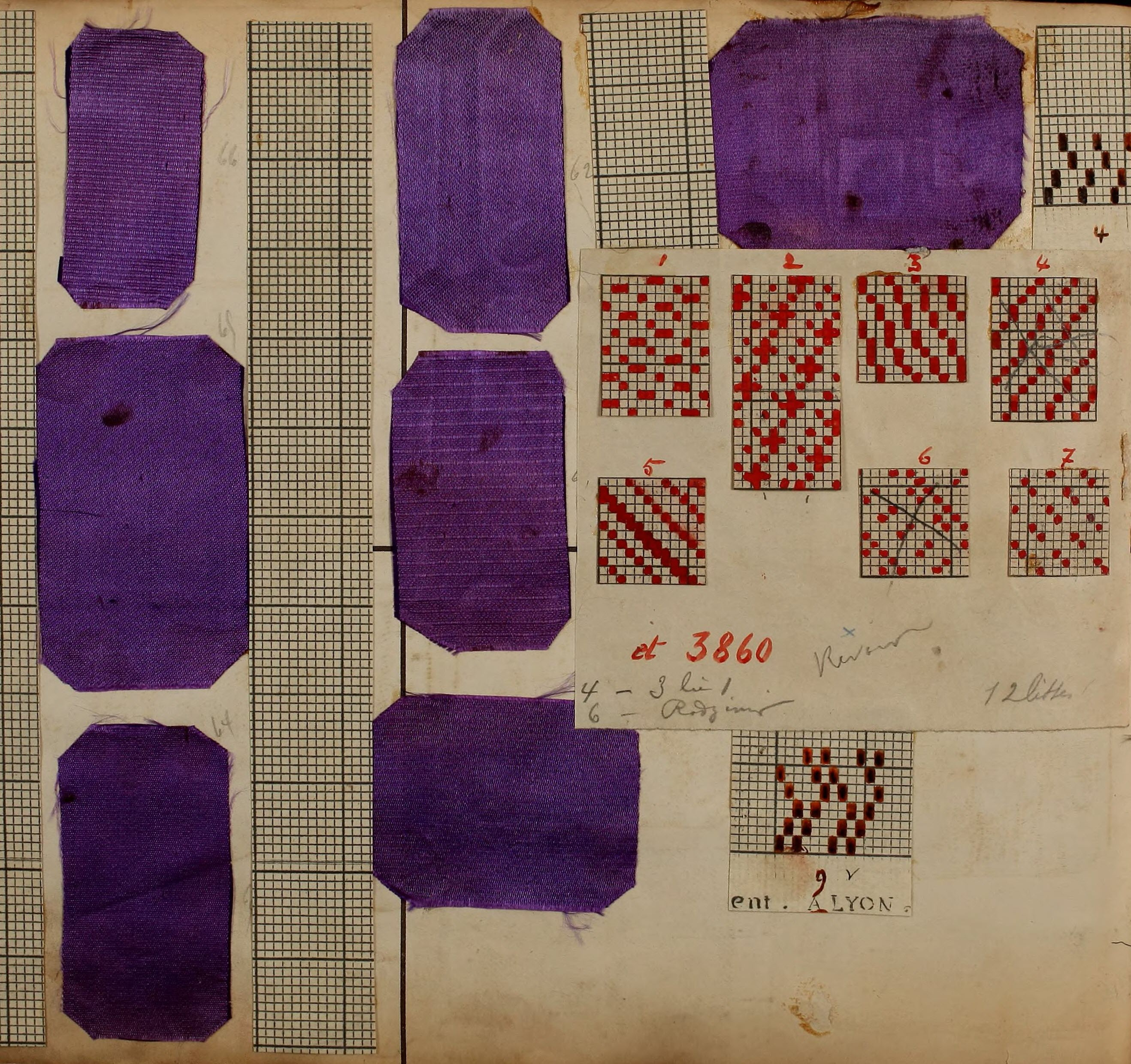
From 'Weaving pattern and sample book' (1900)

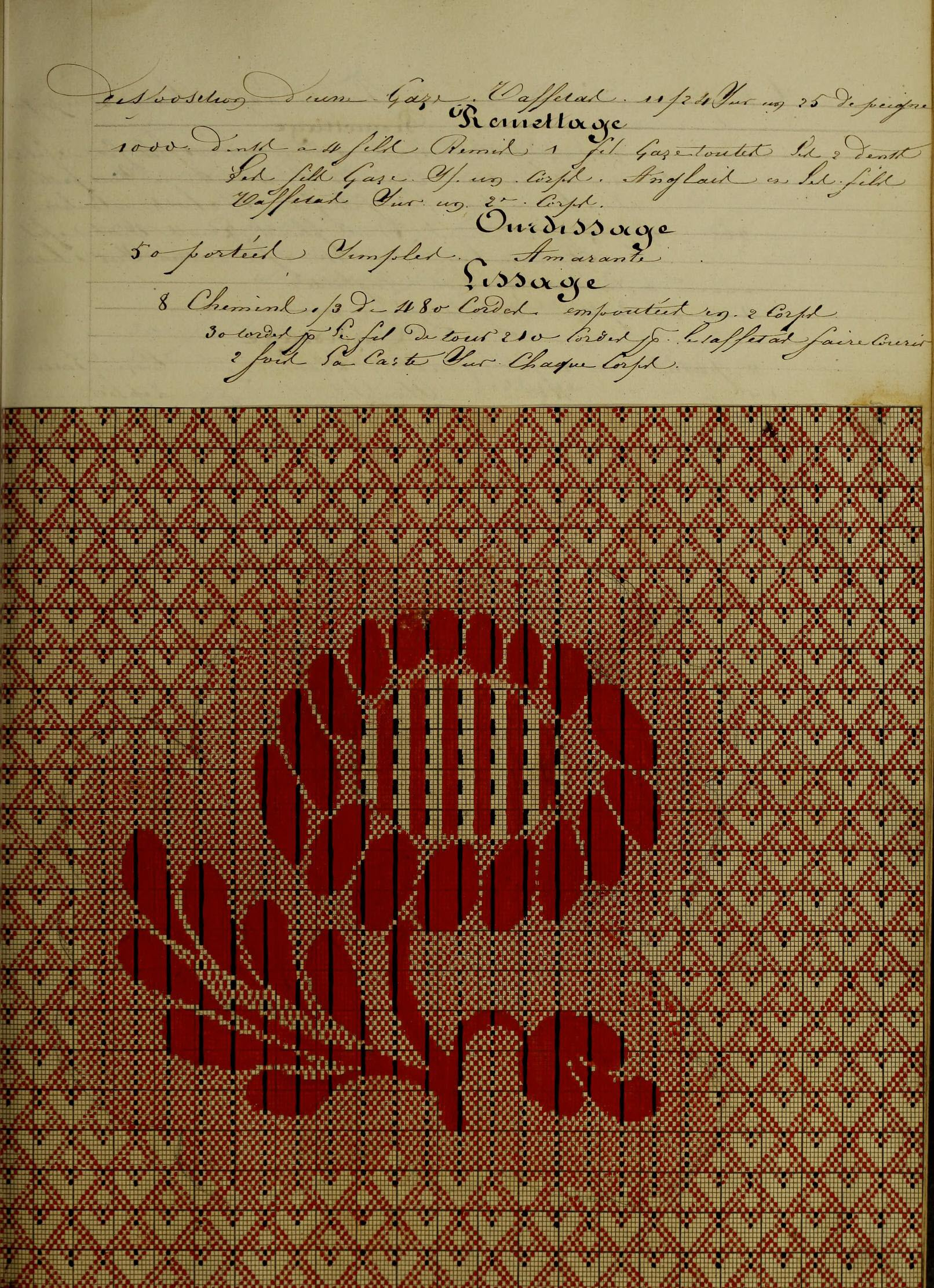
From 'Un metier de fabrique, avec la dénomination des diverses objects nécessaires à la fabrication de l'étoffe' (1835)

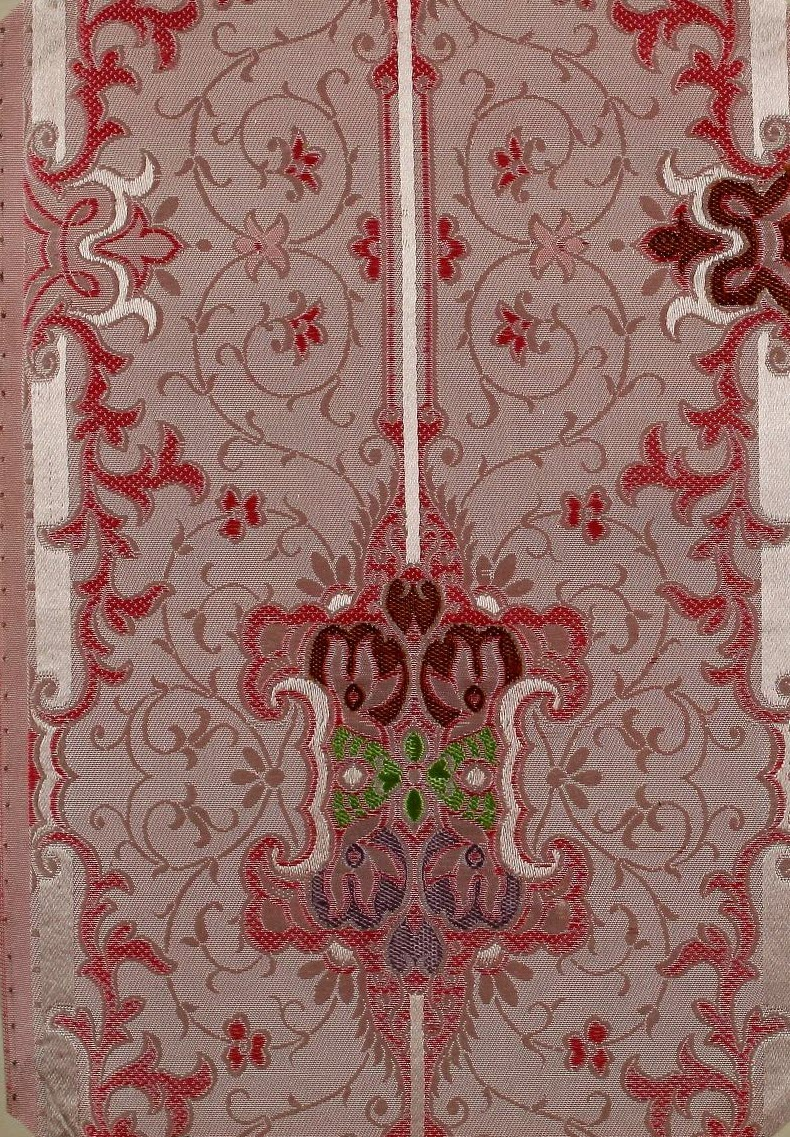
From 'Pattern book of silks and damasks' (1700)

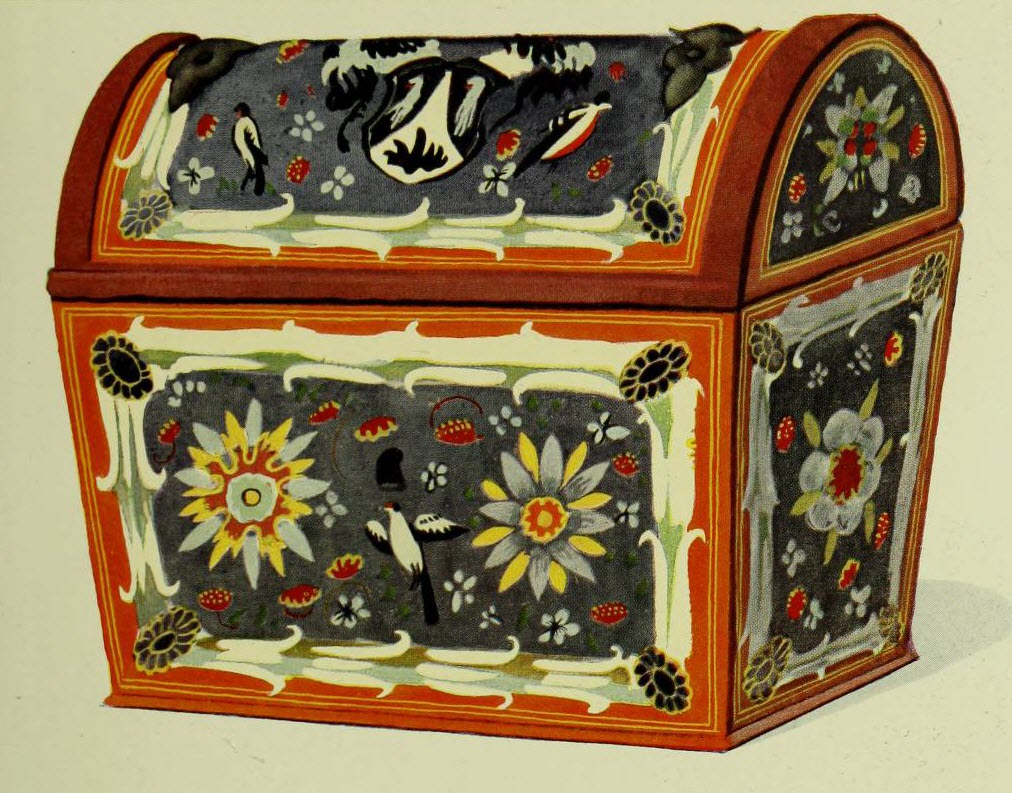
[Detail] Peasant art in Switzerland (1924)

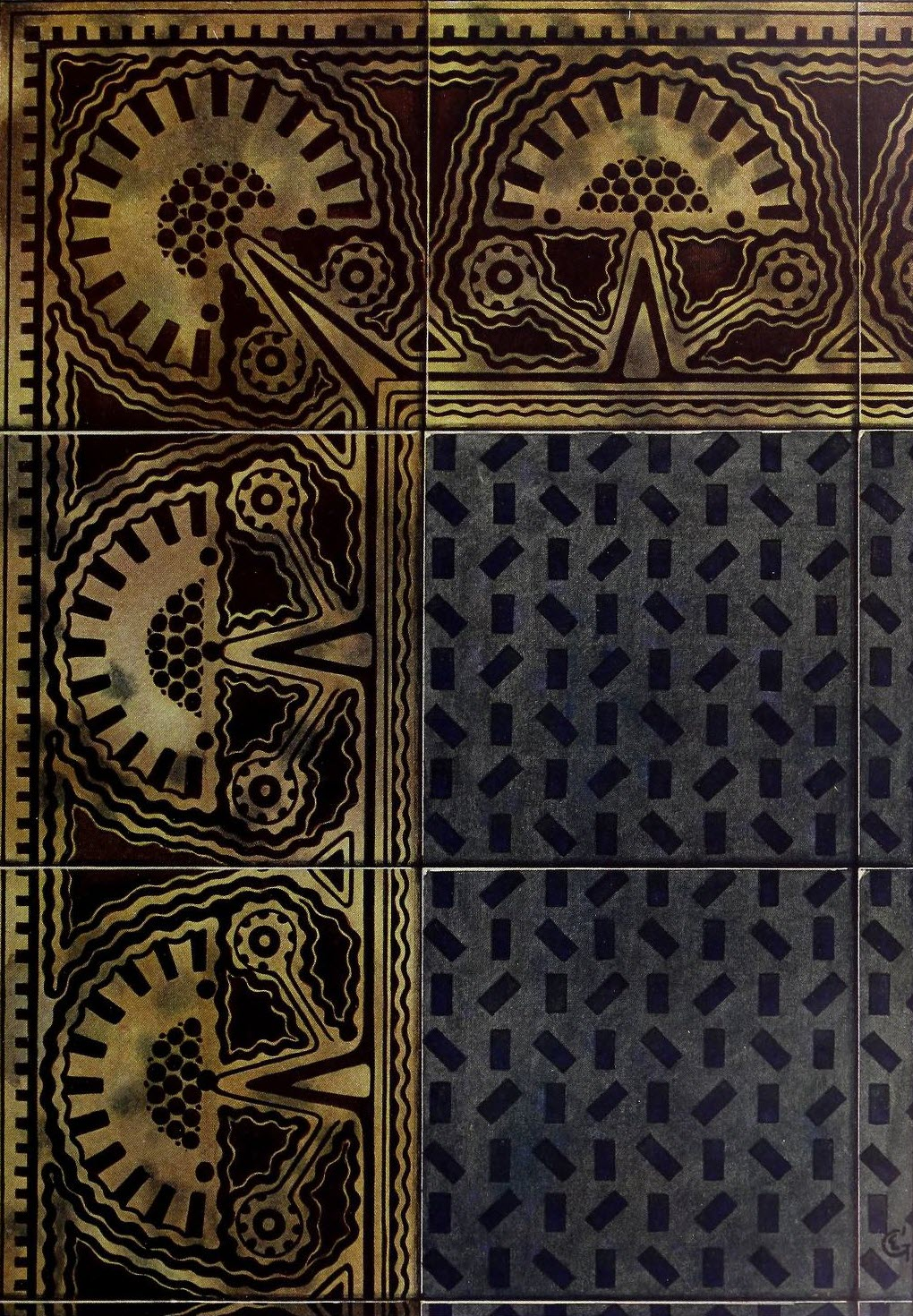
[Detail] Méthode de composition ornementale (1905)

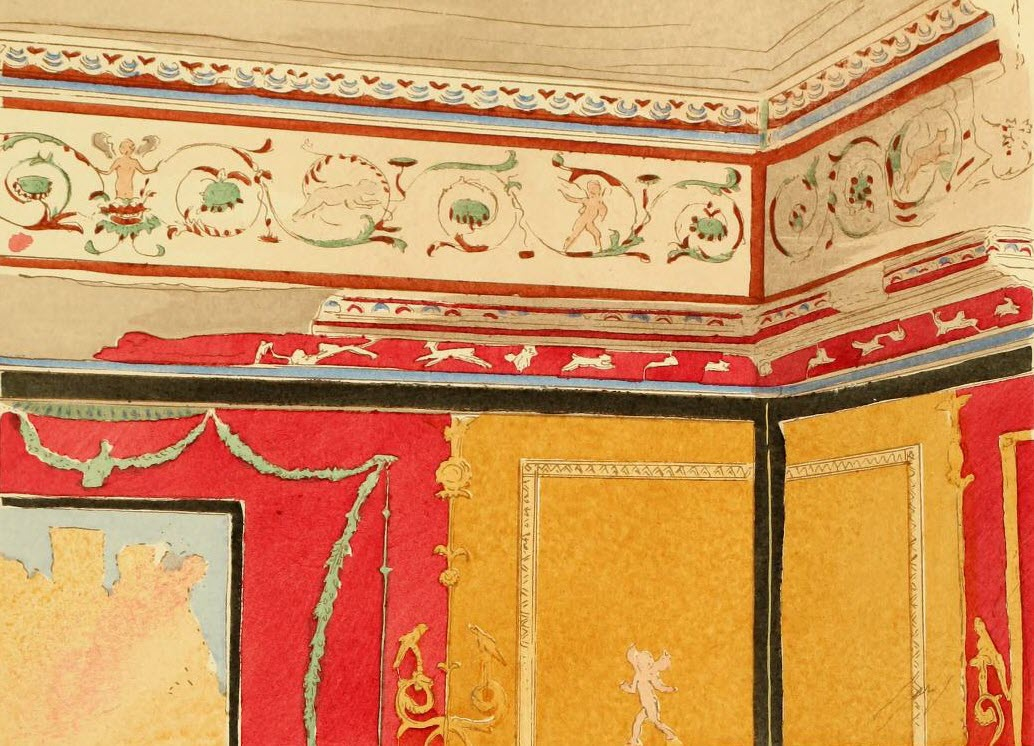
[Detail] La décoration murale à Pompéi (1924)

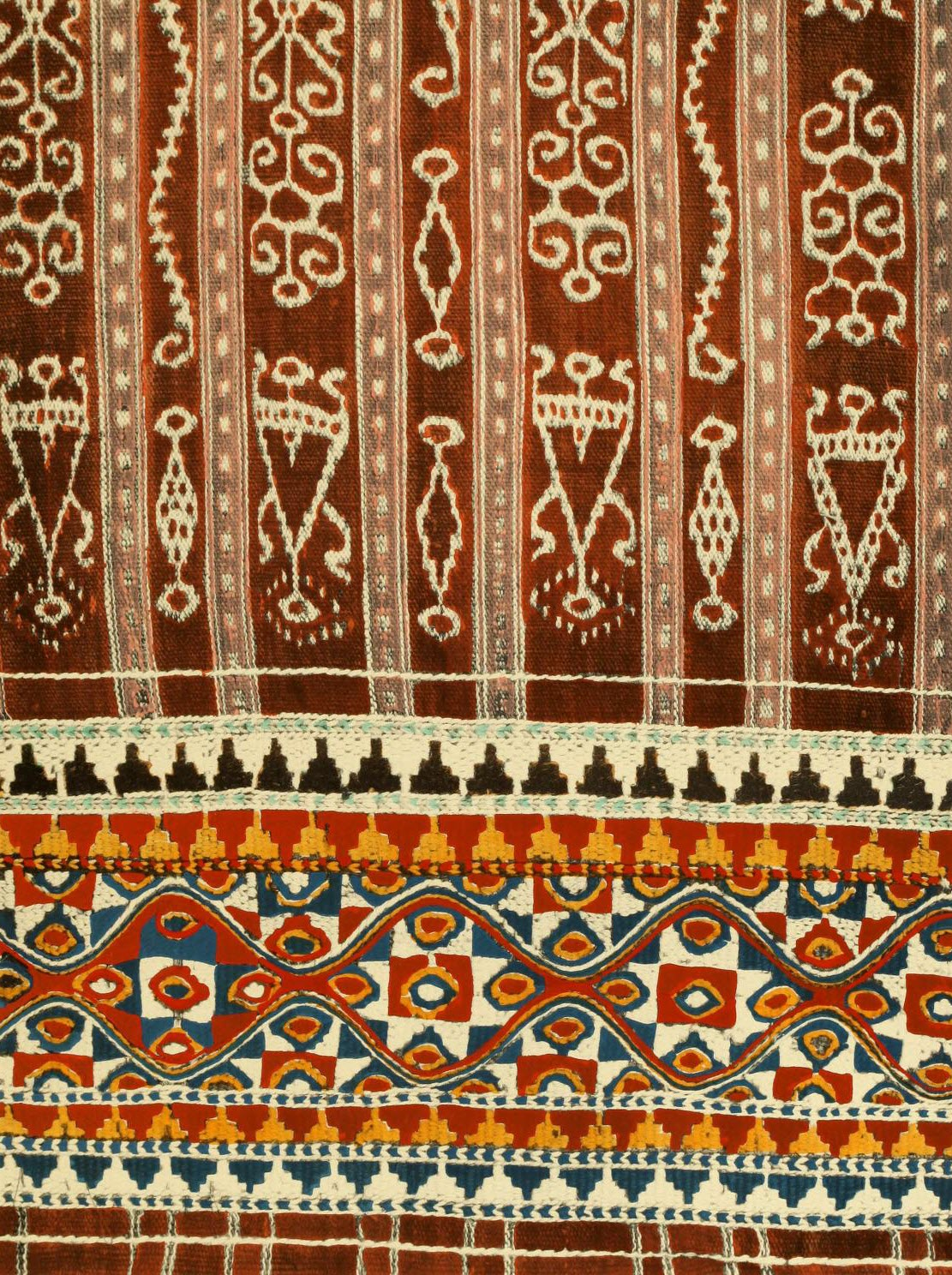
[Detail] La décoration primitive: Océanie (1922)

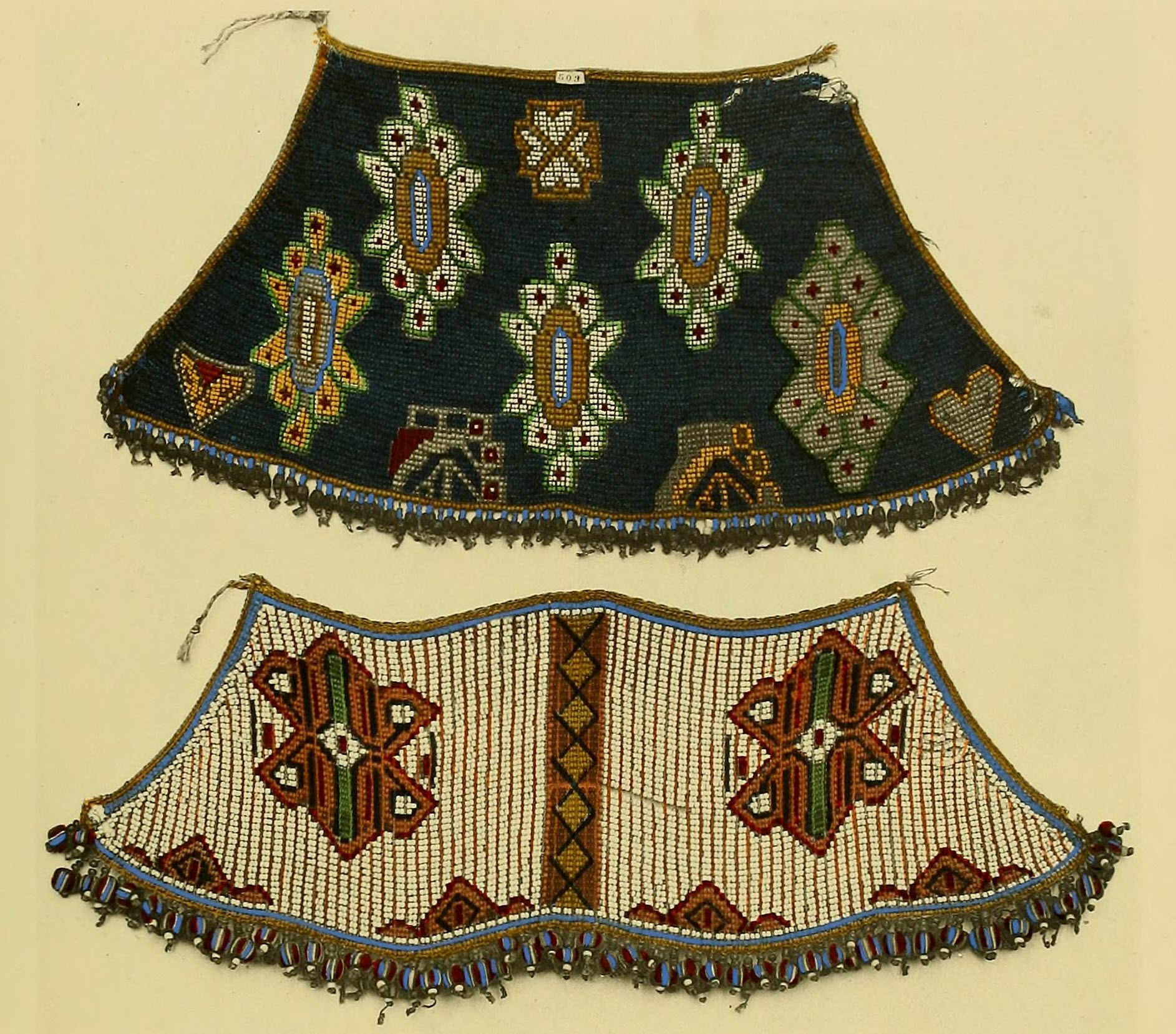
[Detail] La décoration primitive; Amérique post-Colombienne (1922)

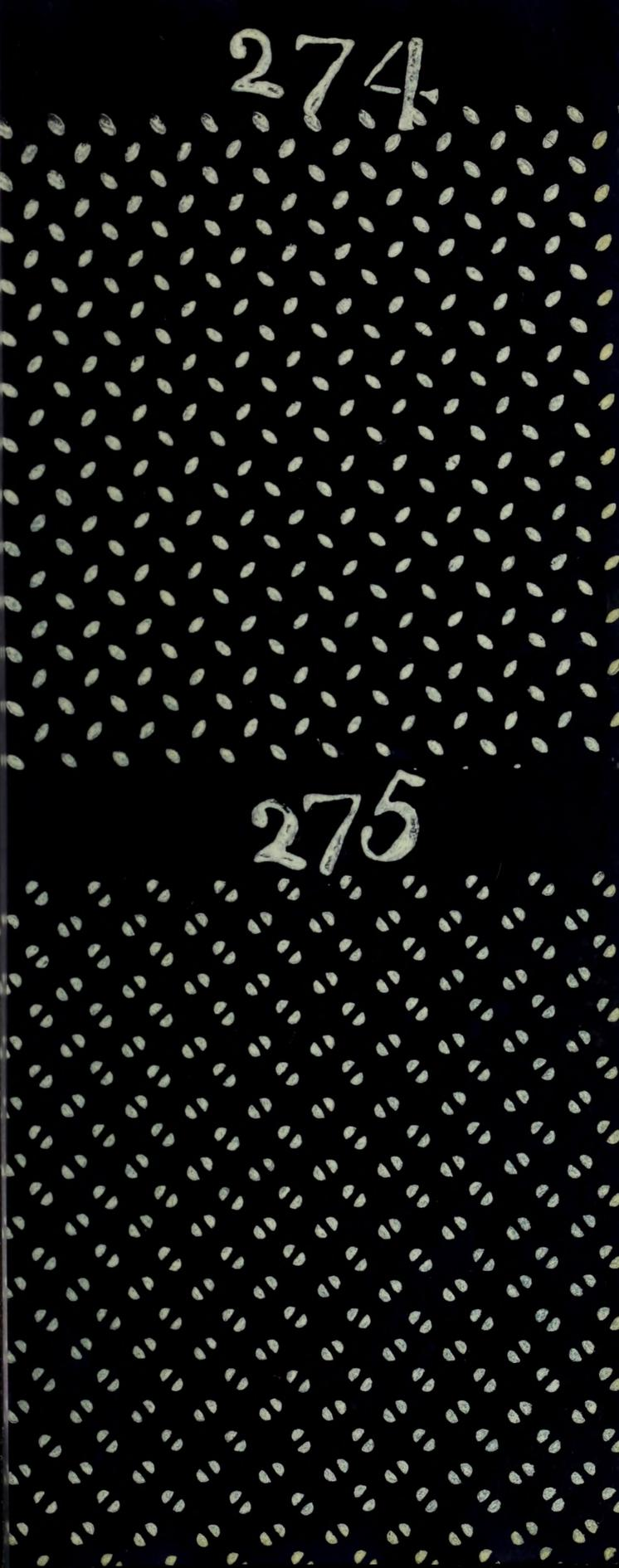
[Detail] Livre de desseins d'Alexandre Lambert (1700)

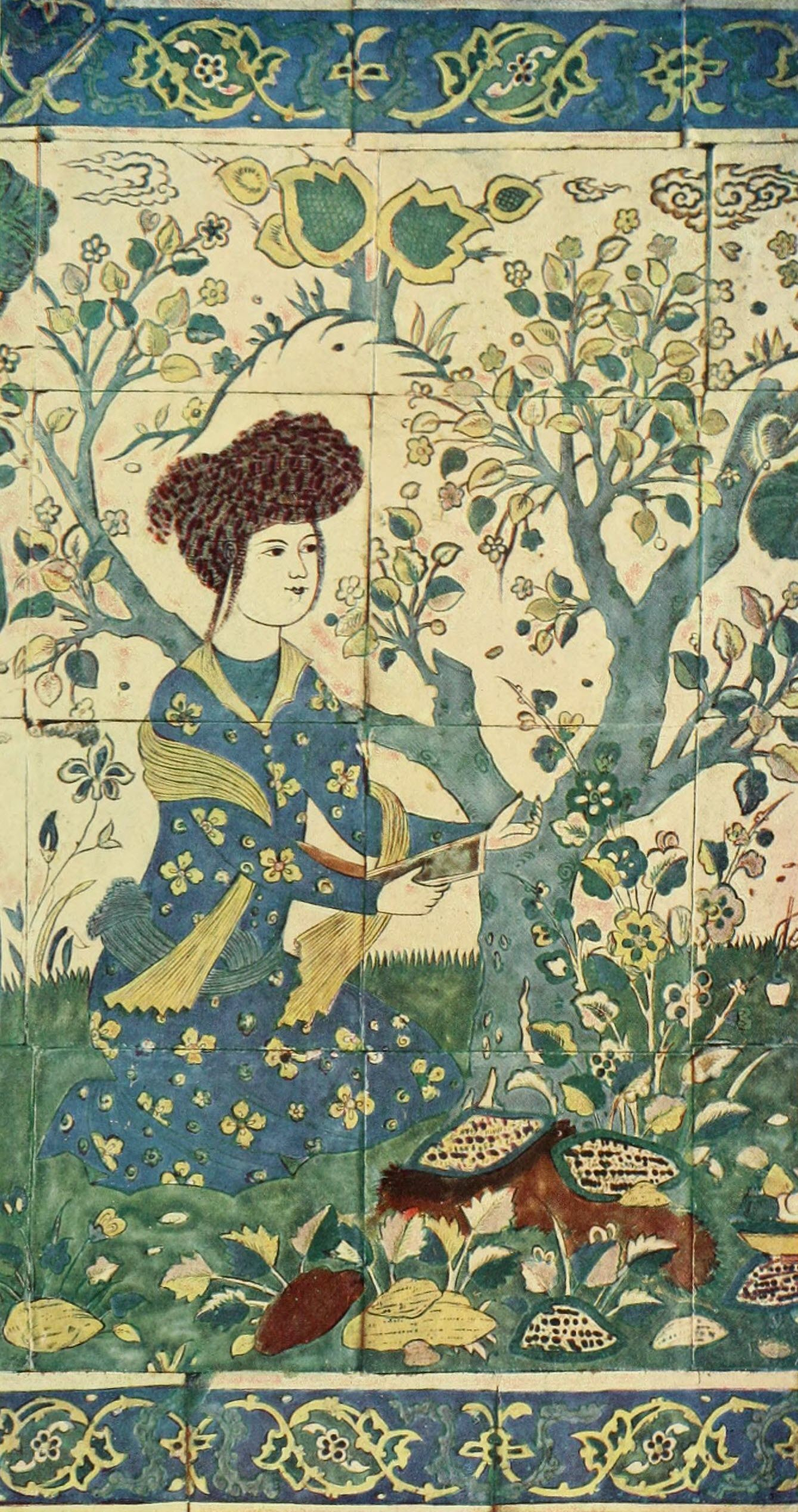
[Detail] Éléments de composition décorative; cent thêmes de décoration plane (1912)

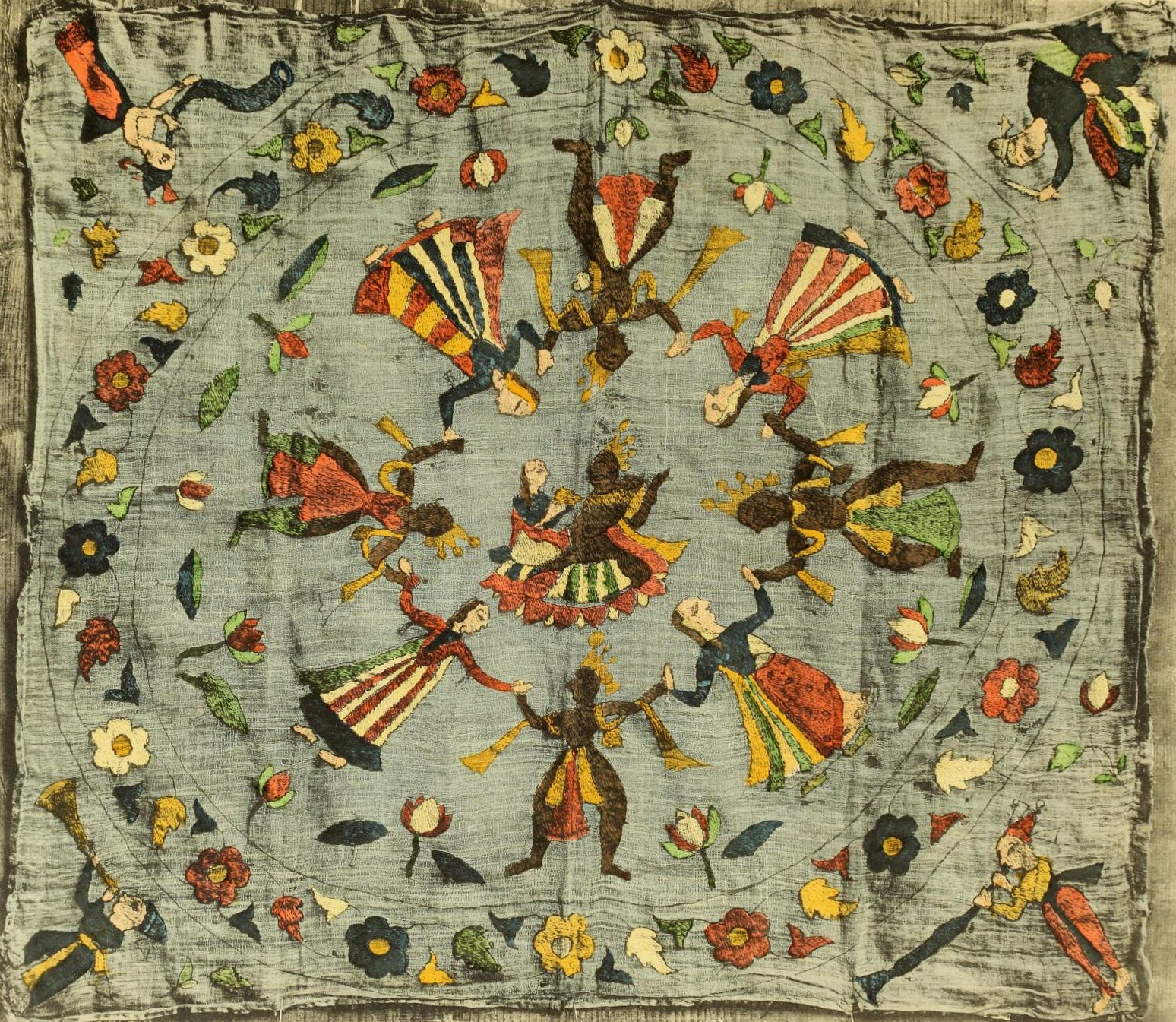
[Detail] Kunstgewerbe der Hindu (1924)

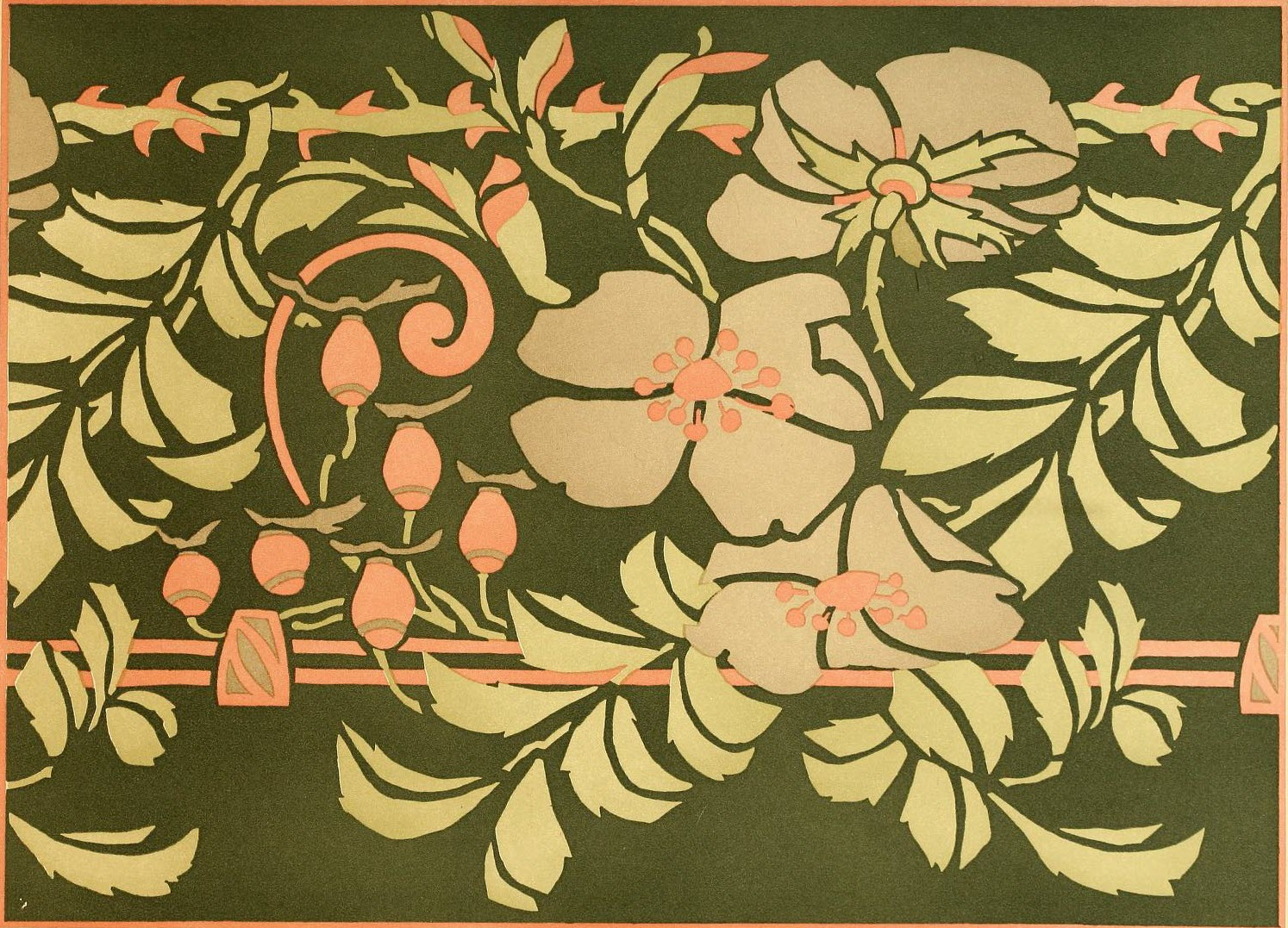
[Detail] Ideas & studies in stencilling & decorating (1927)

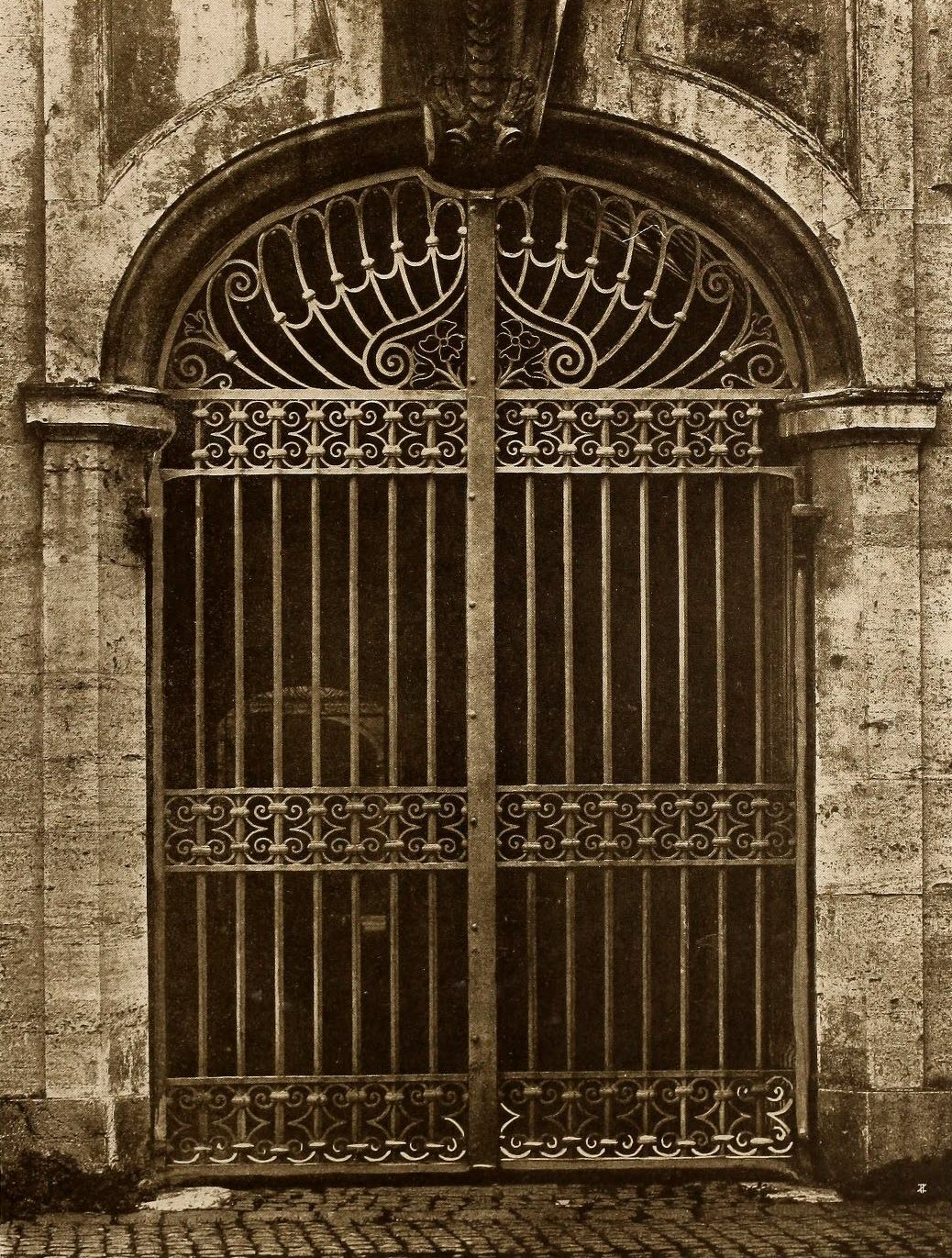
From 'Il ferro nell'arte italiana' (1910). Originally captioned: "Cancello nella Sagrestia di S. Pietro Vaticano."

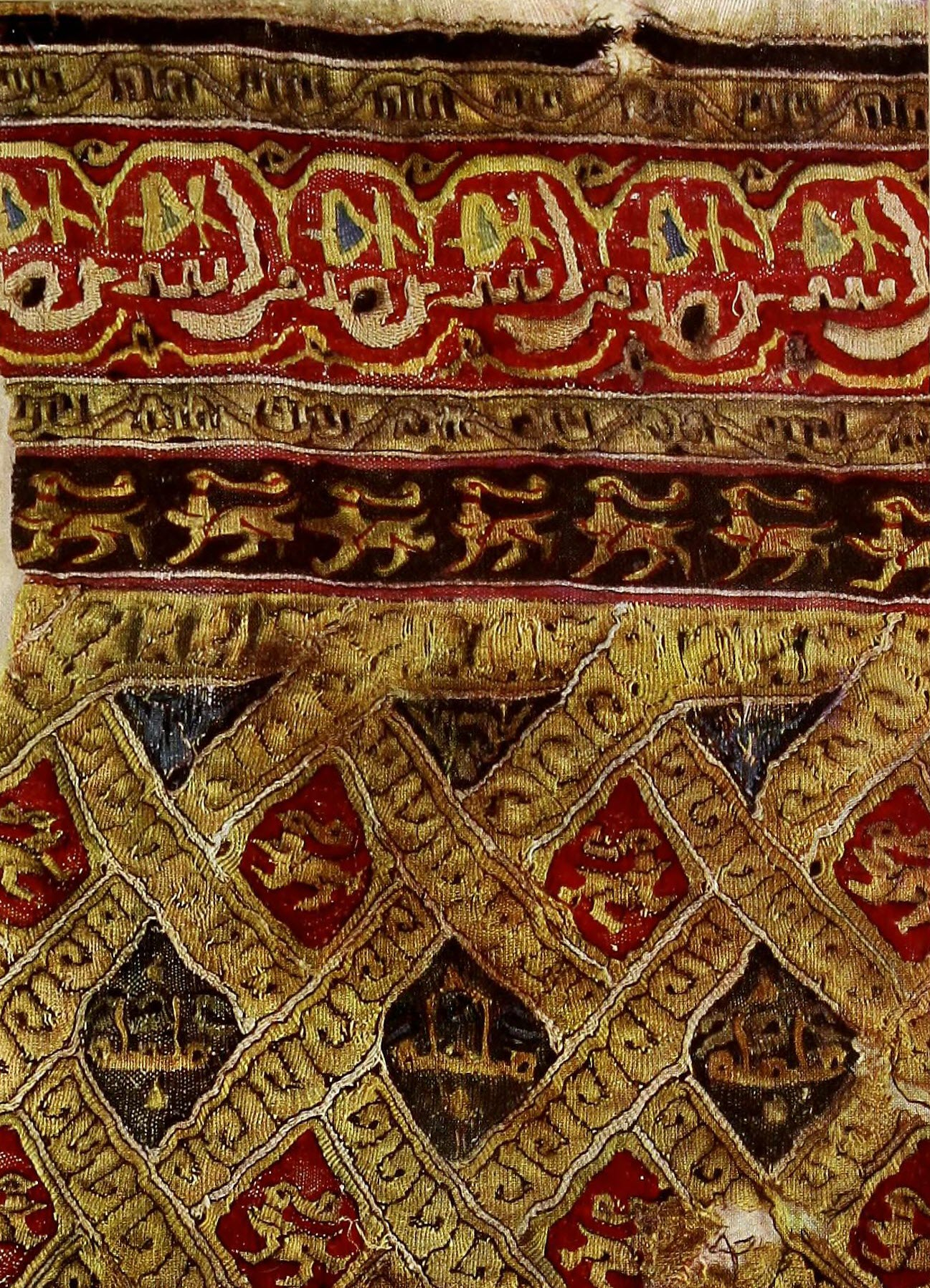
[Detail] Islamische Stoffe aus ägyptischen Gräbern in der Islamischen Kunstabteilung und in der Stoffsammlung des Schlossmuseums (1927)

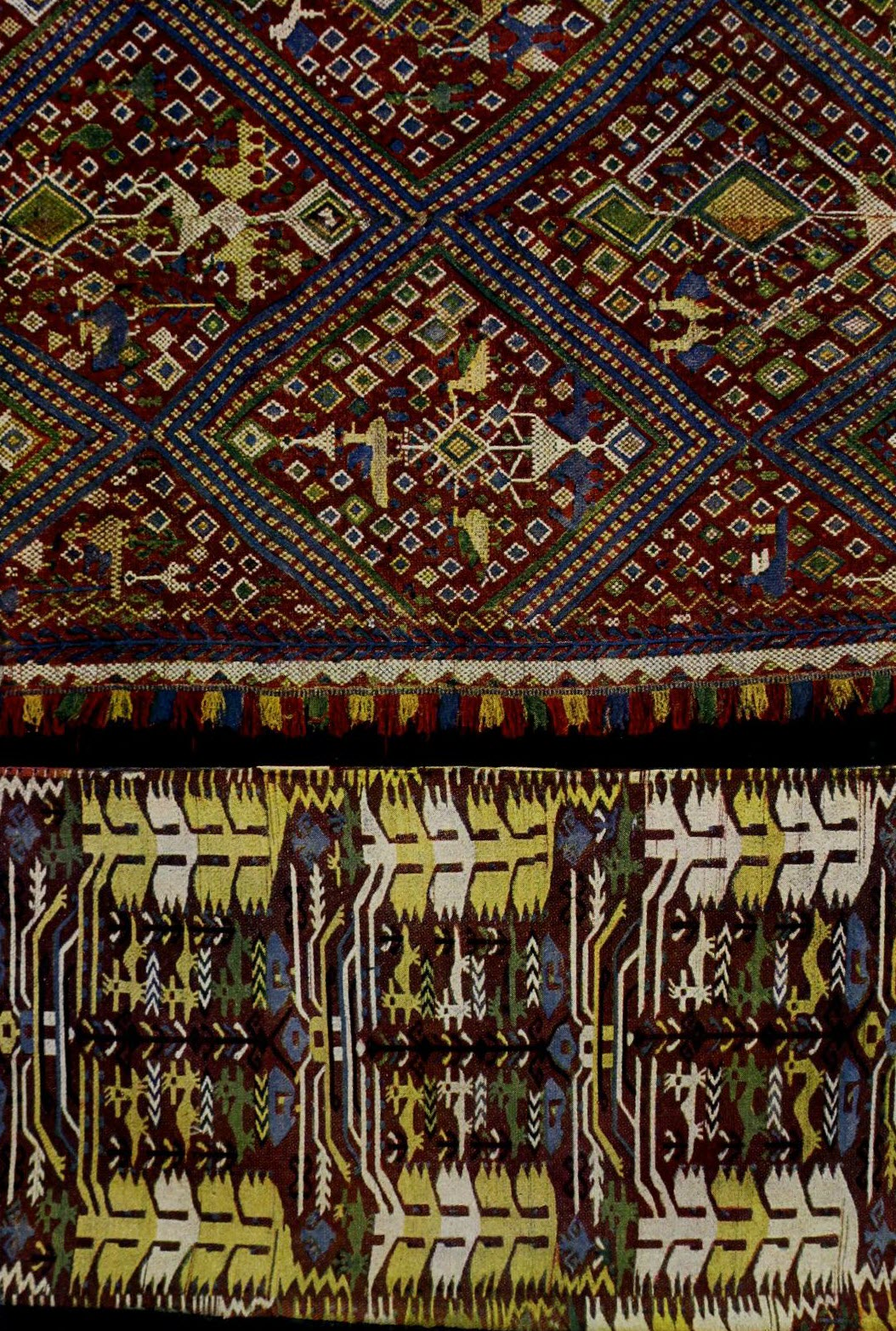
[Detail] Italian peasant rugs (1923)

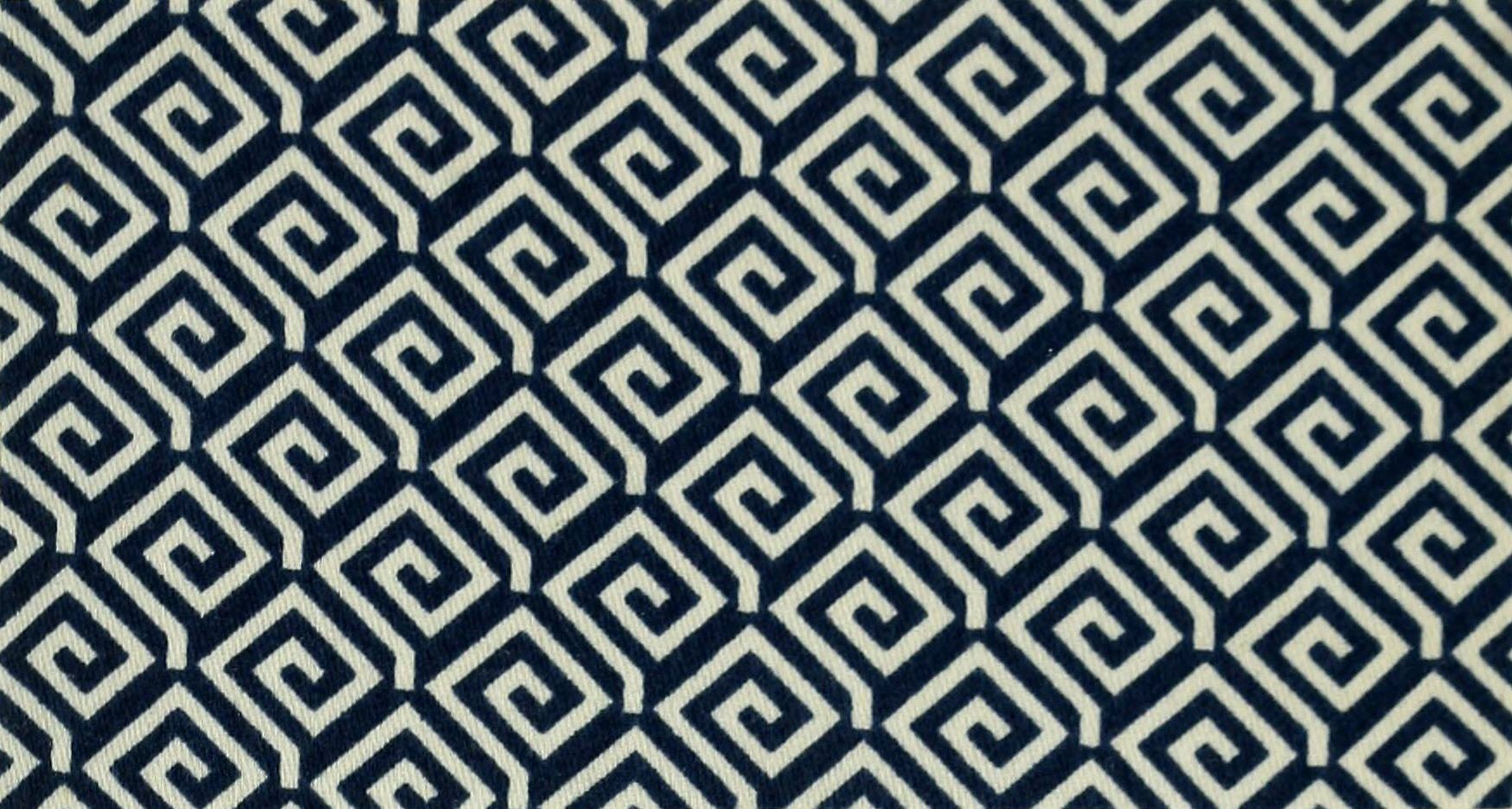
[Detail] "Hydron blue printed on cotton cloth..." Hydron blue G and R, patented paste 20% and powder (1911)

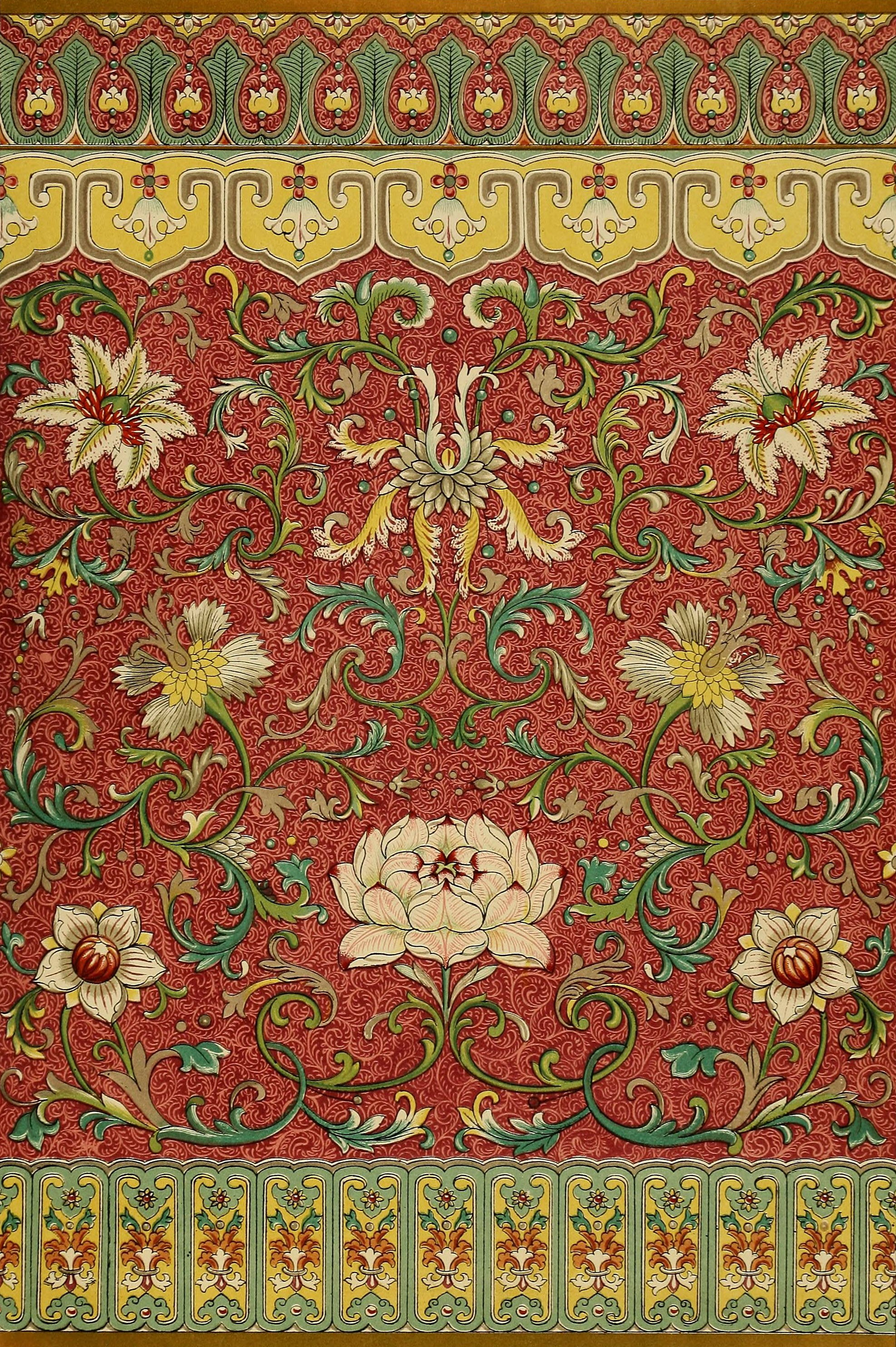
[Detail] Examples of Chinese ornament selected from objects in the South Kensington museum and other collections (1867)

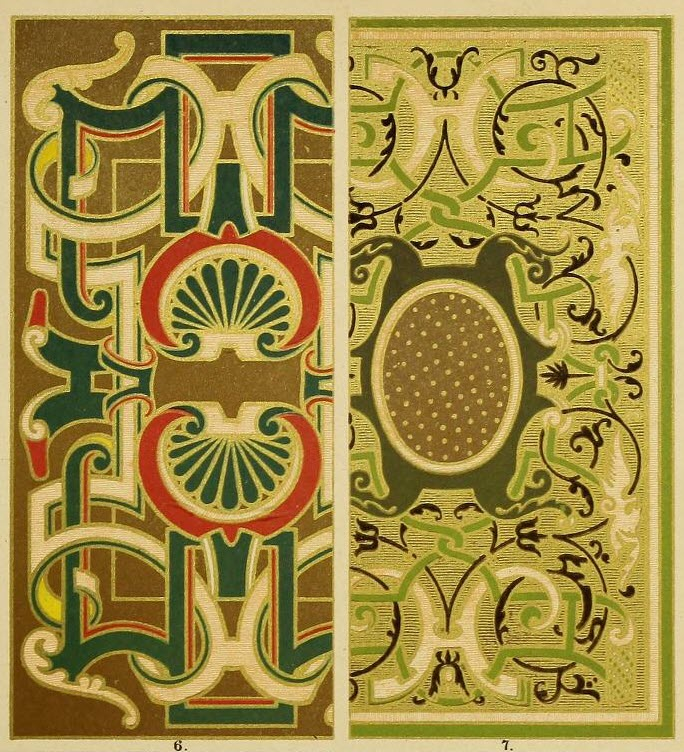
[Detail] Der Ornamentenschatz; ein Musterbuch stilvoller Ornamente aus allen Kunstepochen (1887)

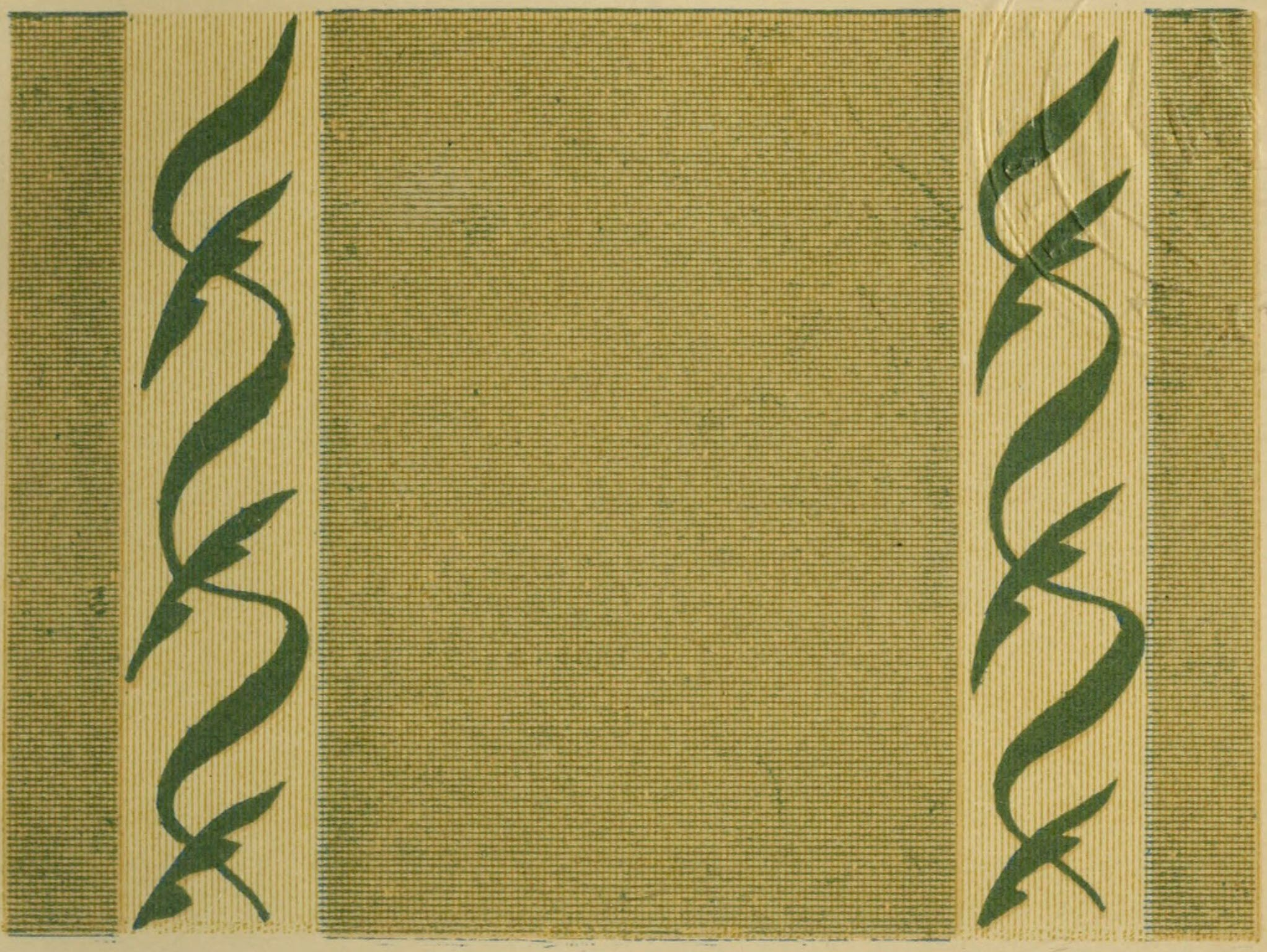
[Detail] Design in textile fabrics (1883)

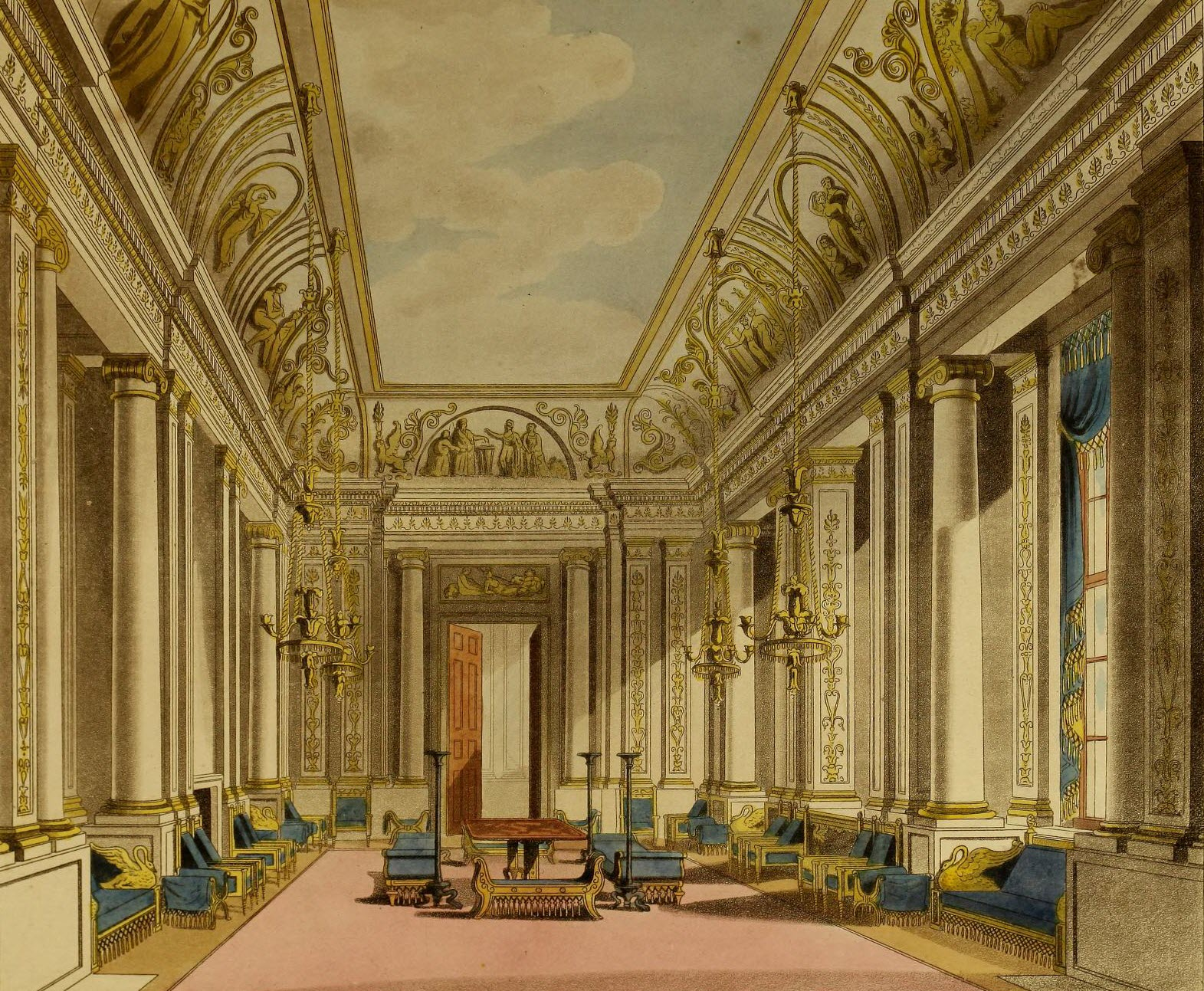
[Detail] Collection of designs for household furniture and interior decoration, in the most approved and elegant taste (1808)

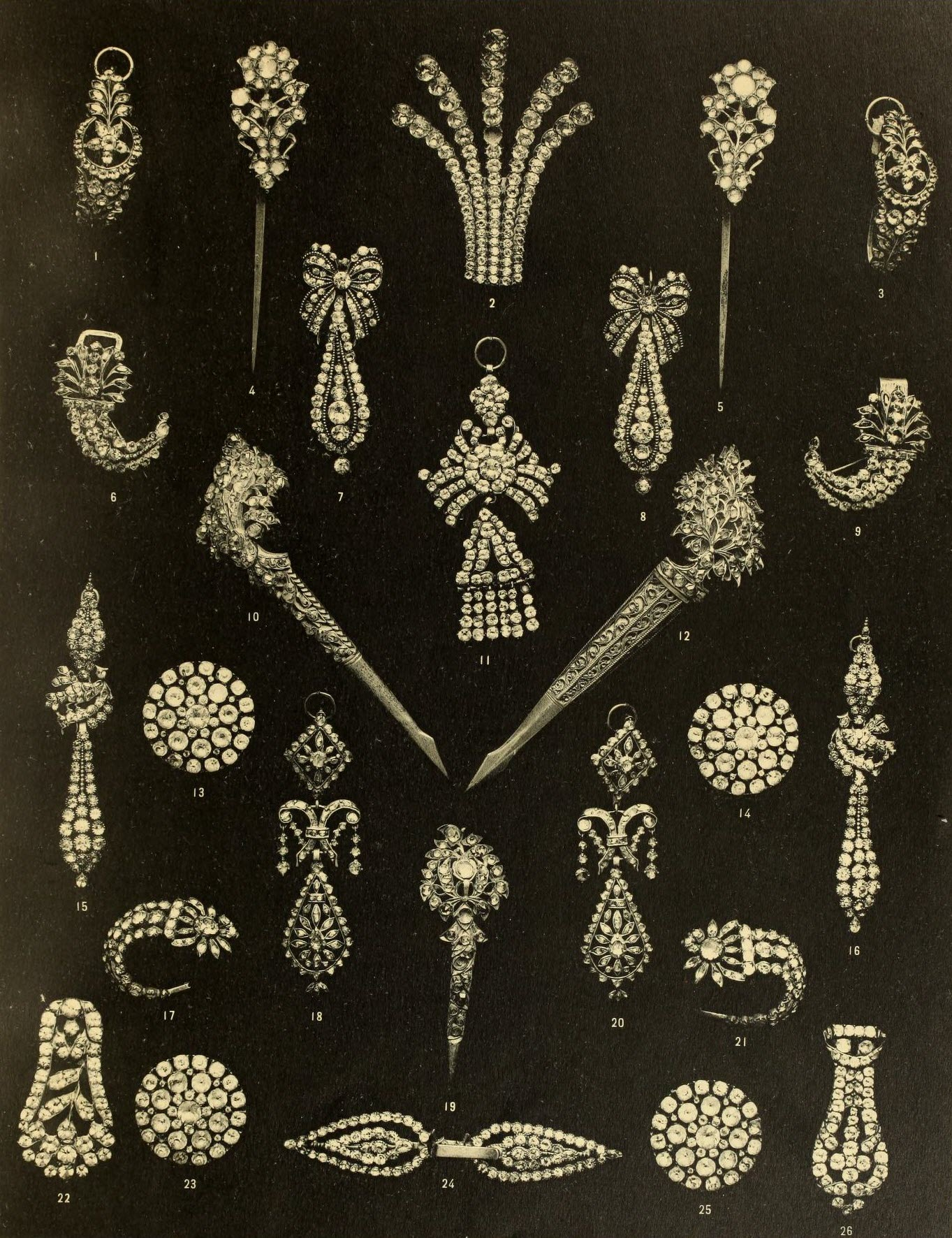
[Detail] Les accessoires du costume et du mobilier depuis le treizième jusqu'au milieu du dixneuvième siècle... Ouvrage contenant 393 phototypies, reproduisant plus de 3.000 documents (1928)

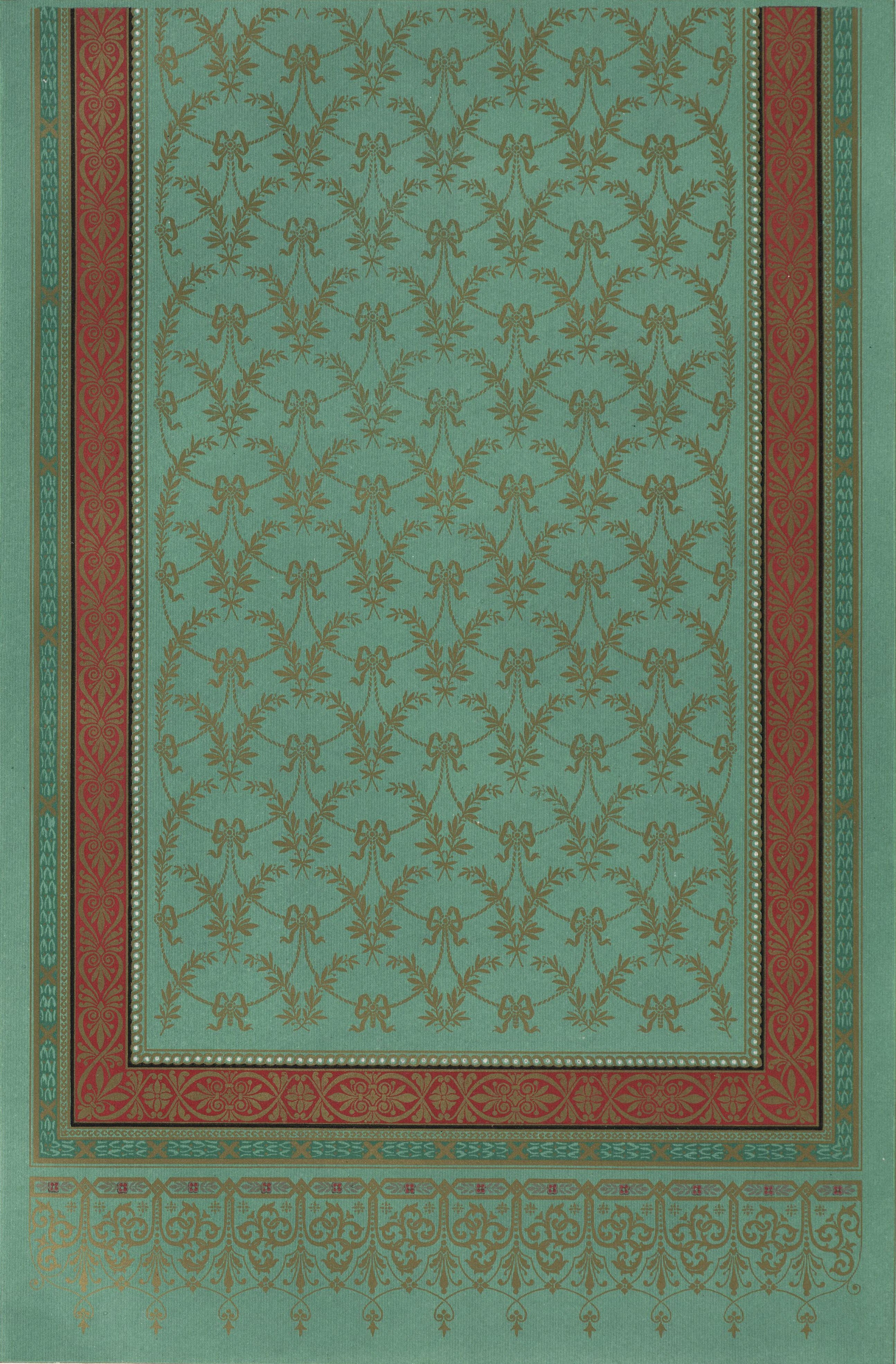
[Detail] Curtains & portières (1900)

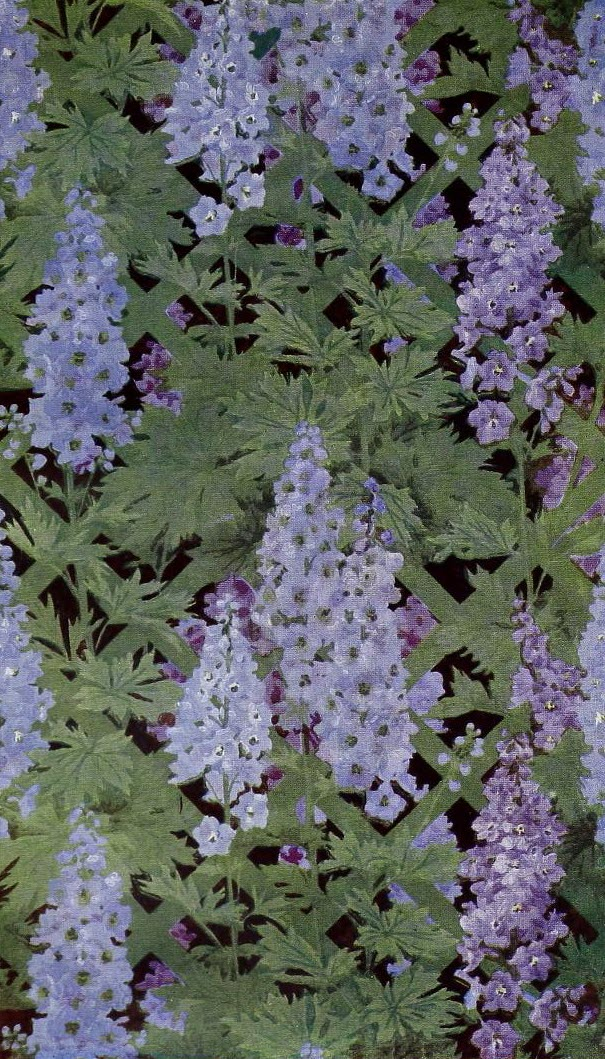
[Detail] A history of English wallpaper, 1509–1914 (1926)

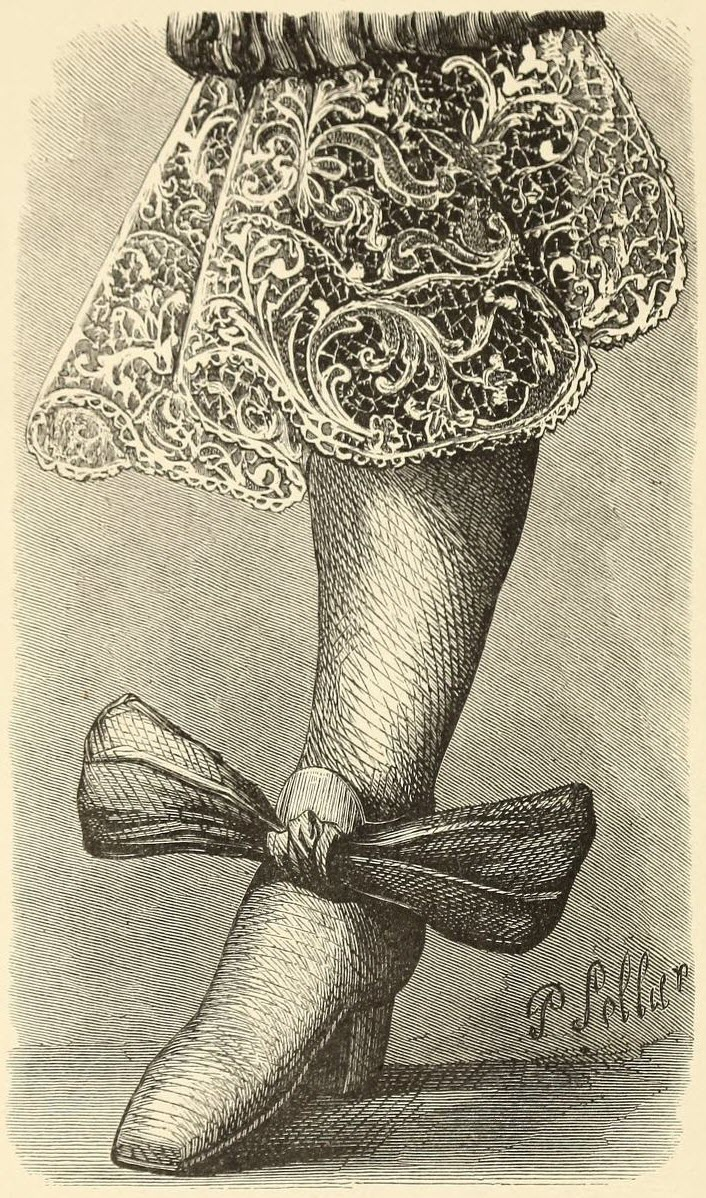
[Detail] A history of lace (1875)

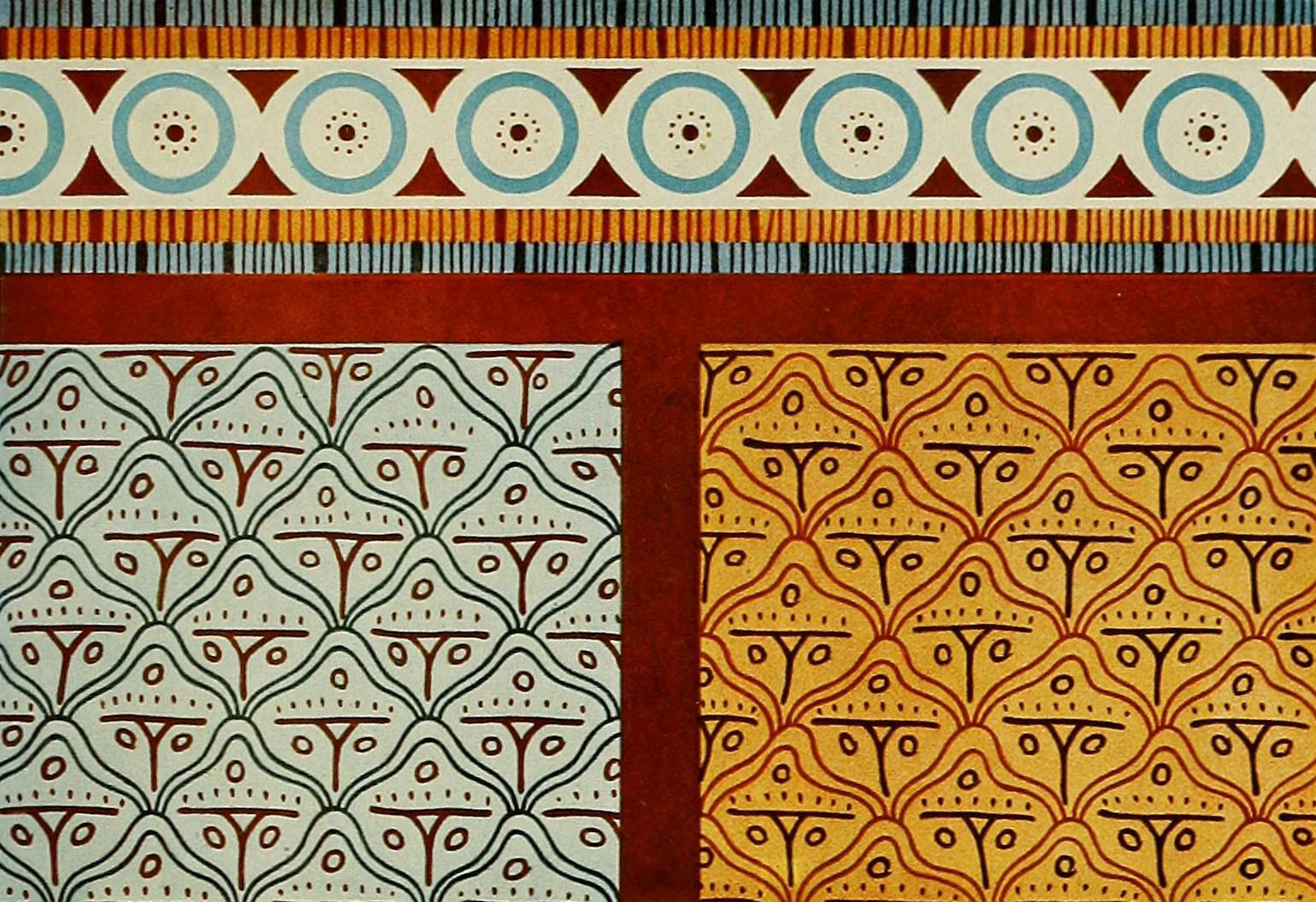
[Detail] An encyclopaedia of colour decoration from the earliest times to the middle of the 19th century (1928)

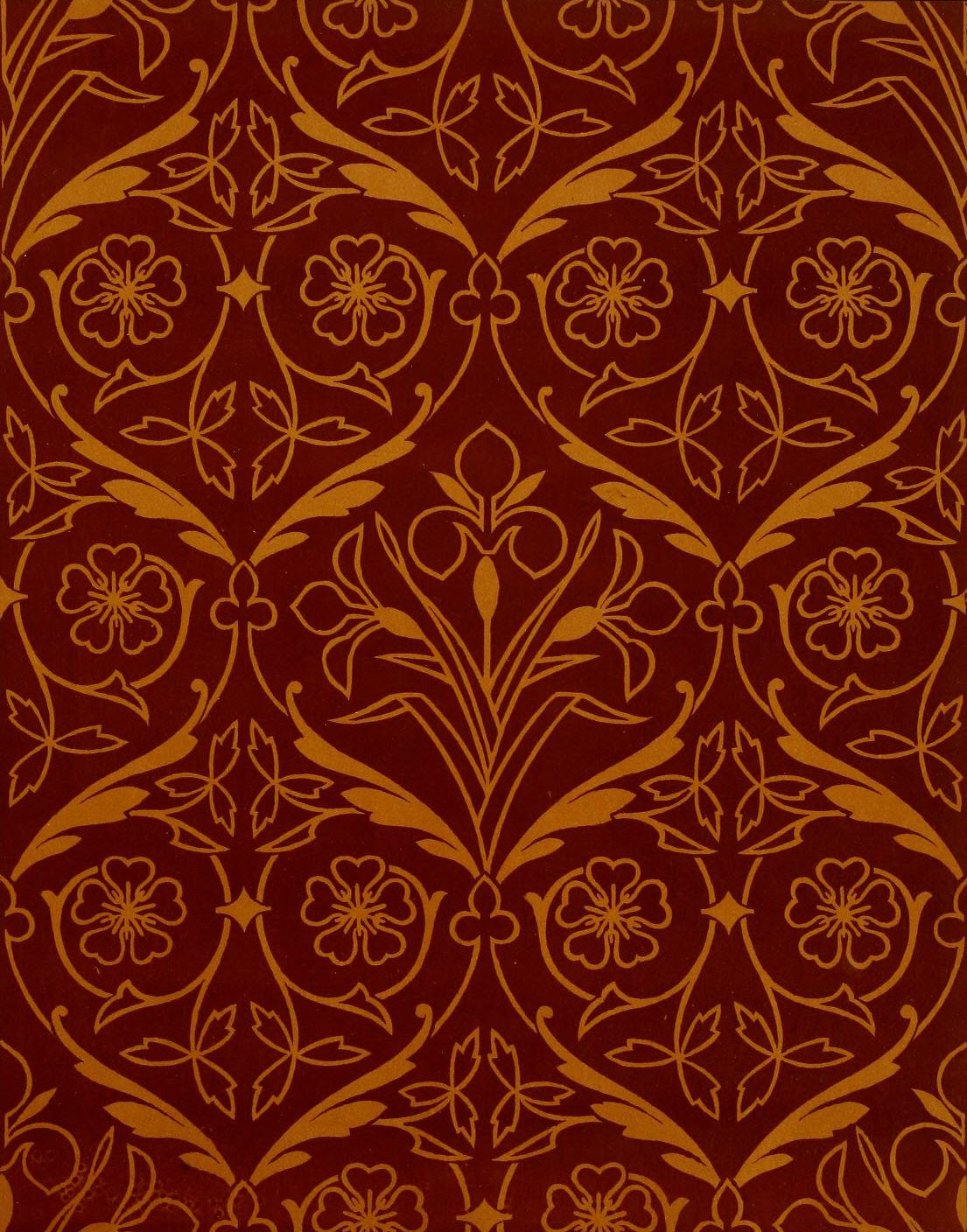
[Detail] Art embroidery: a treatise on the revived practice of decorative needlework (1878)

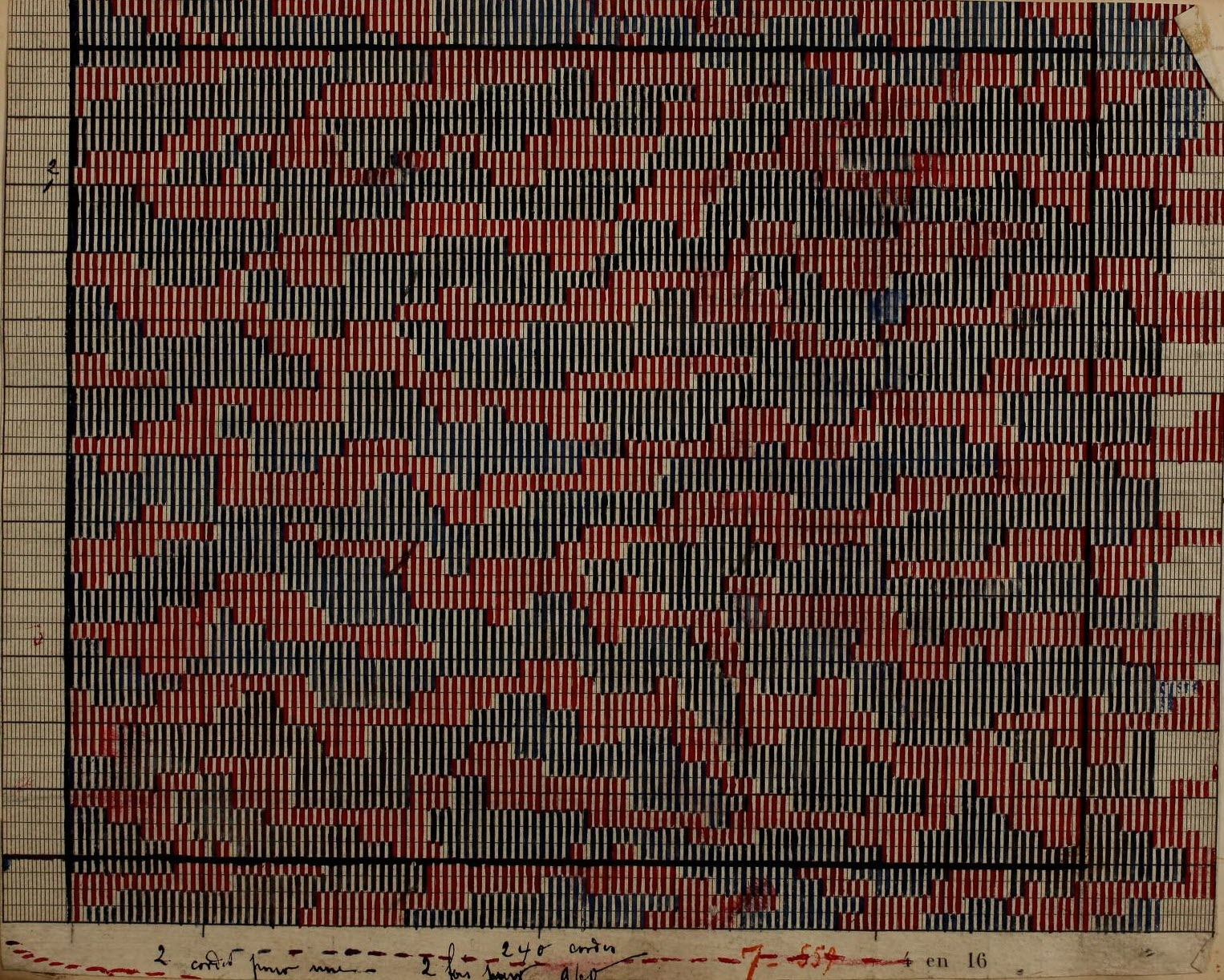
[Detail] Weaving pattern and sample book (1900)

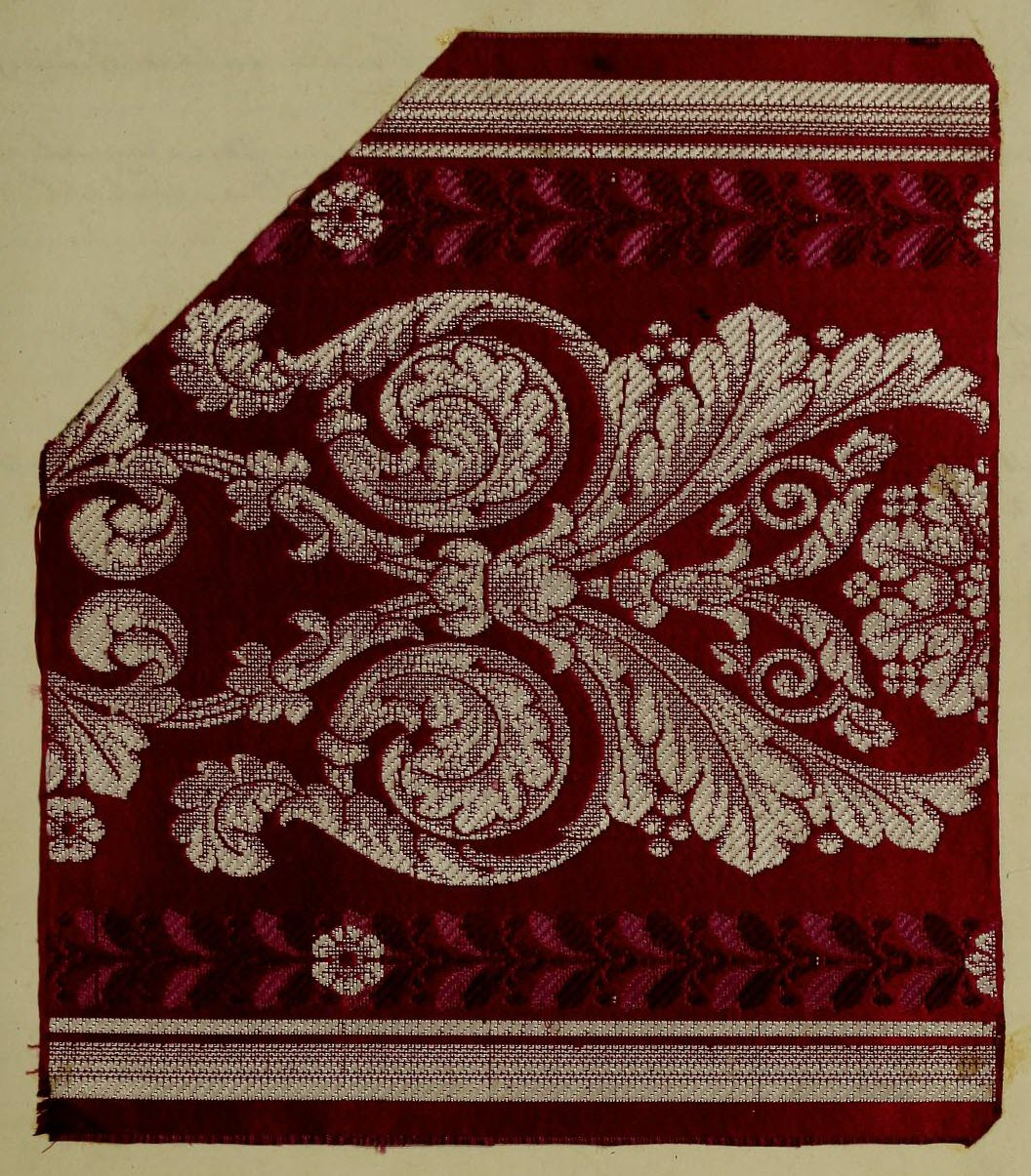
[Detail] Un metier de fabrique, avec la dénomination des diverses objects nécessaires à la fabrication de l'étoffe (1835)

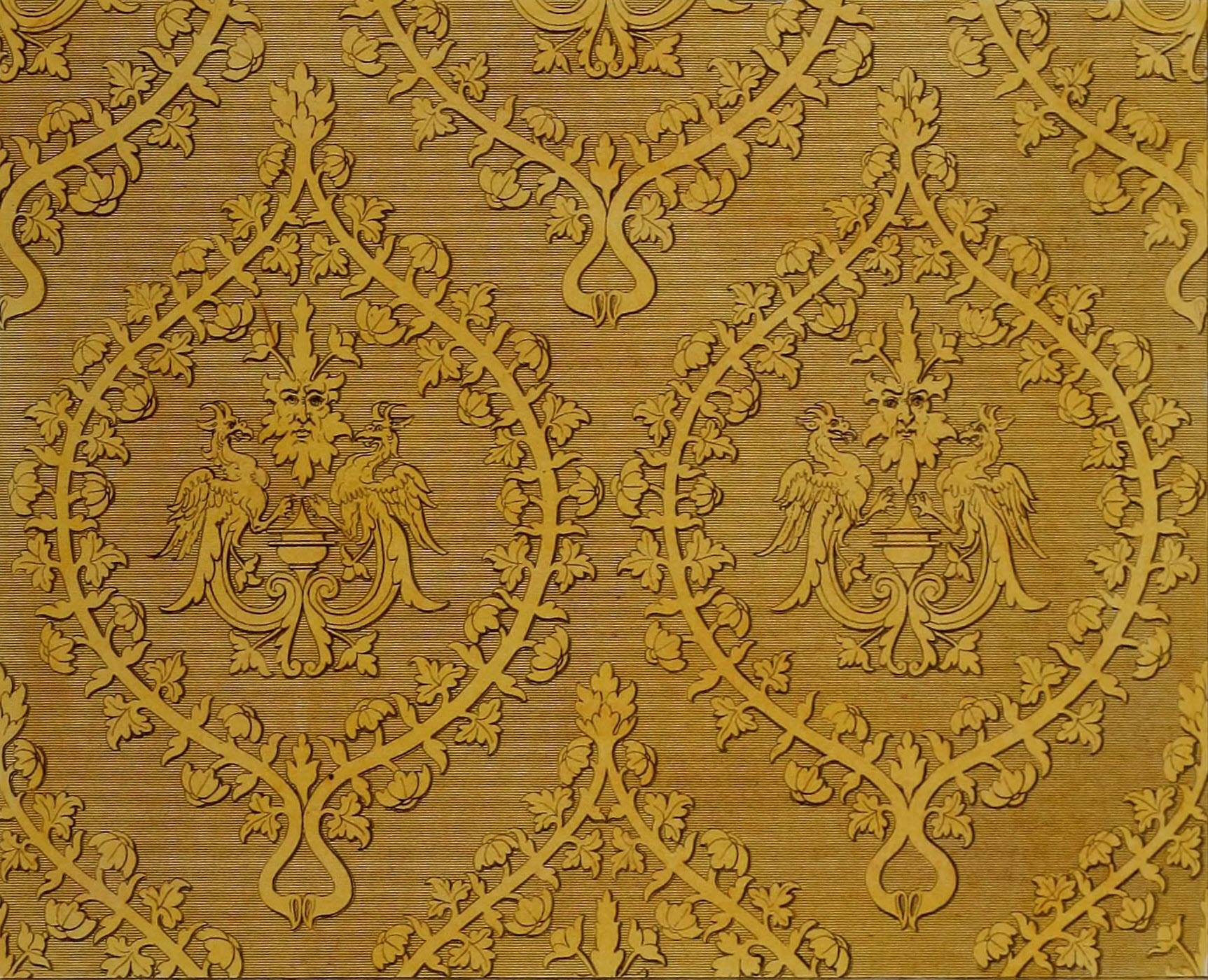
[Detail] The encyclopædia of ornament (1842)

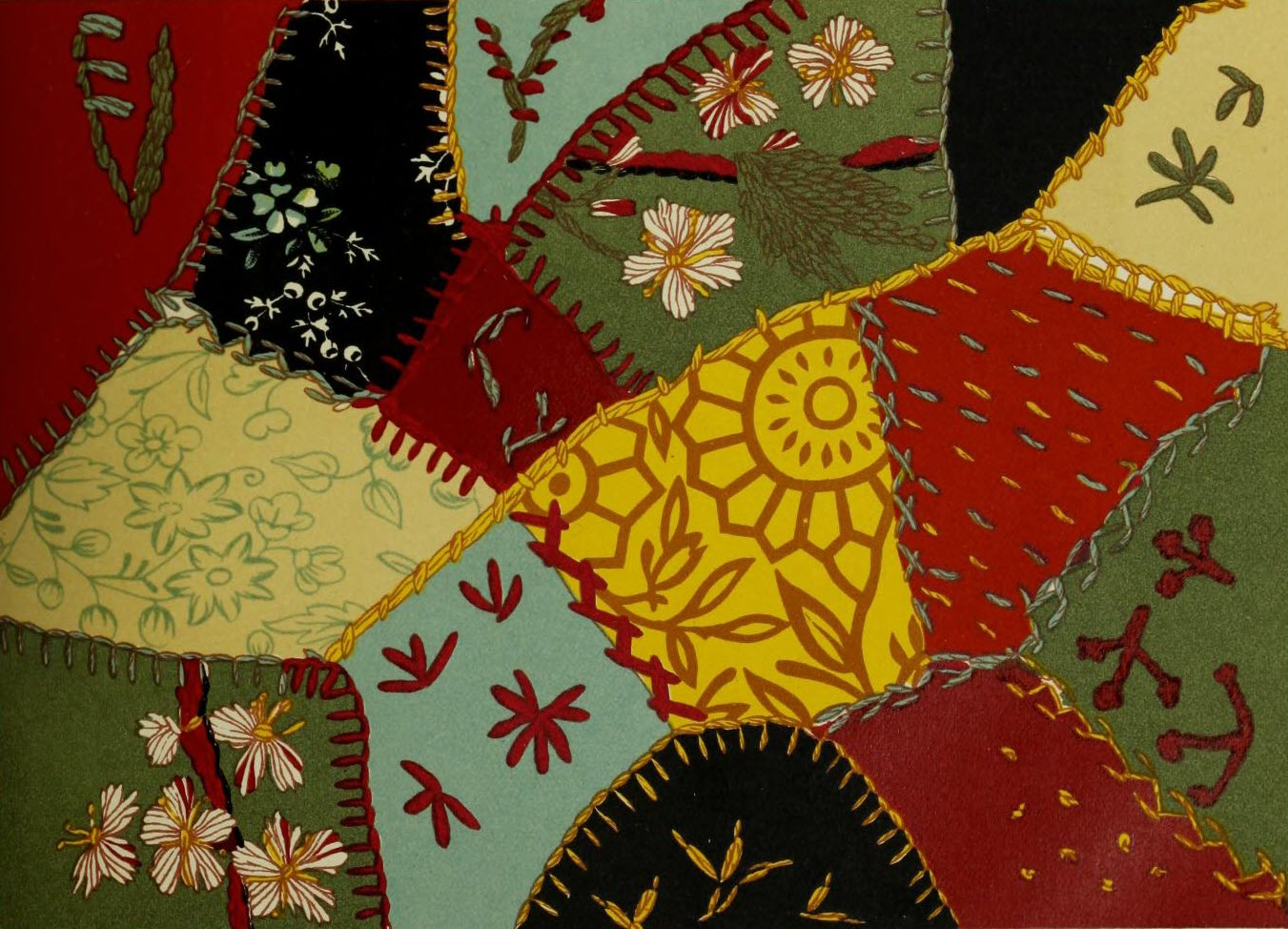
[Detail] The dictionary of needlework: an encyclopædia of artistic, plain, and fancy needlework ... (1882)

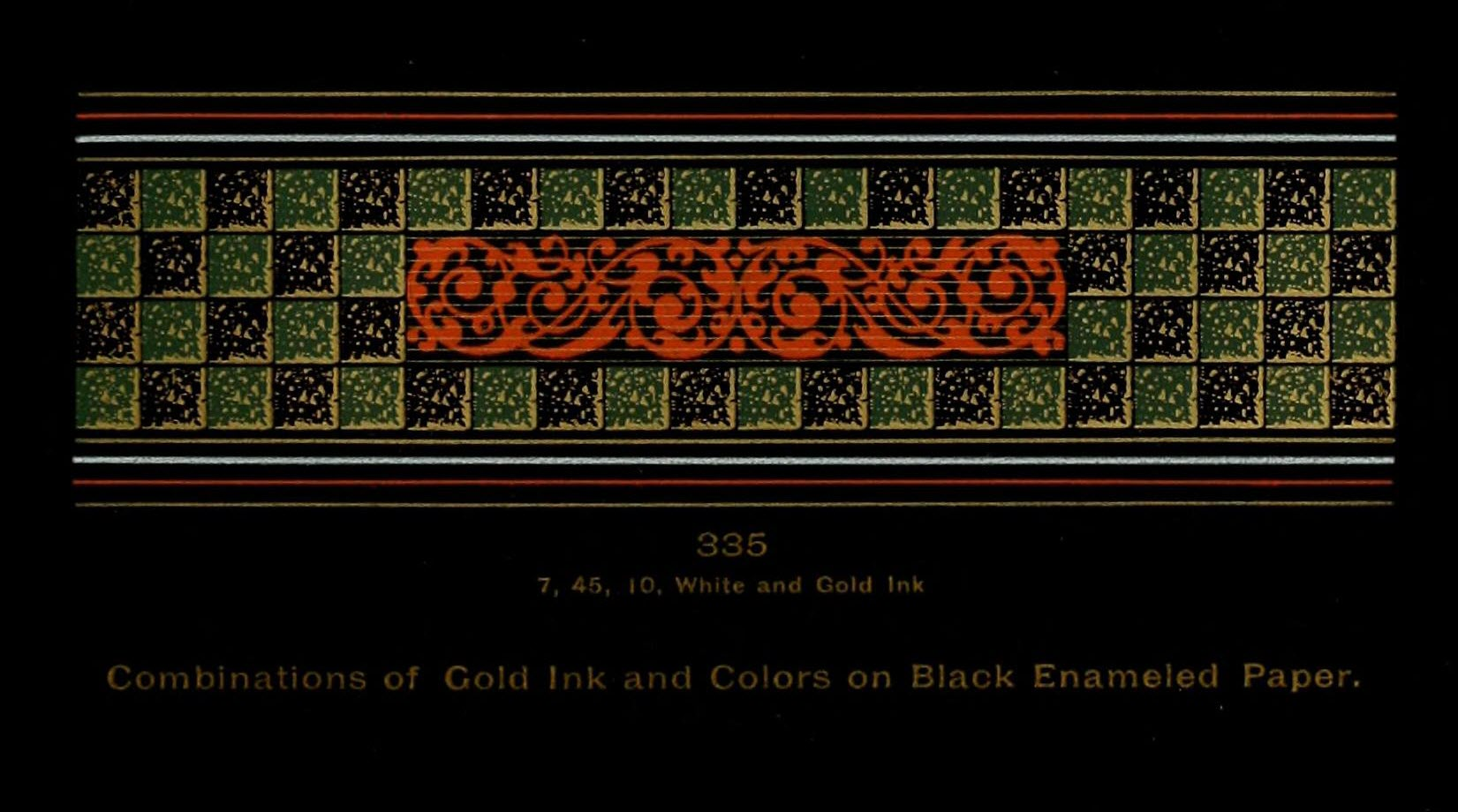
[Detail] The color printer. A treatise on the use of colors in typographic printing (1892)

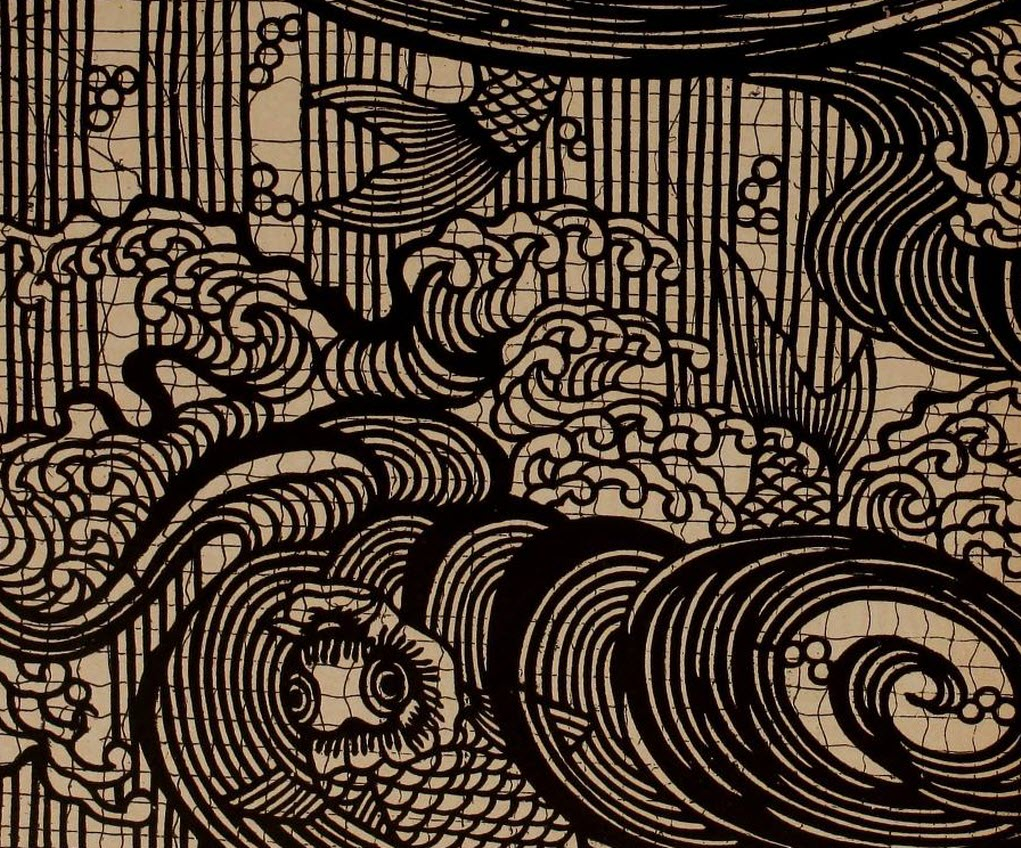
From 'The book of delightful and strange designs; being one hundred facsimile illustrations of the art of the Japanese stencil-cutter, to which the gentle reader is introduced' (1893)

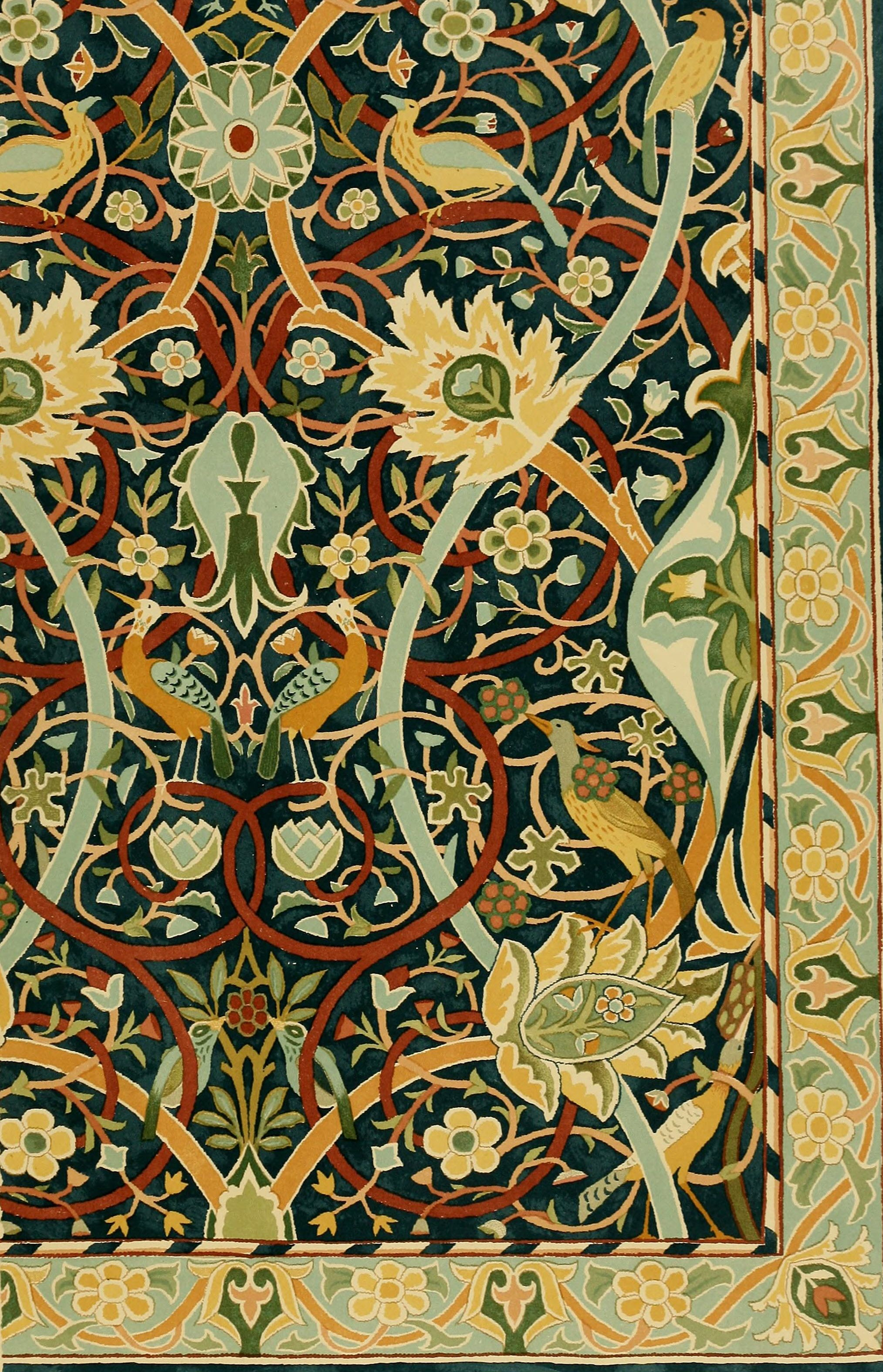
[Detail] The art of William Morris (1897)

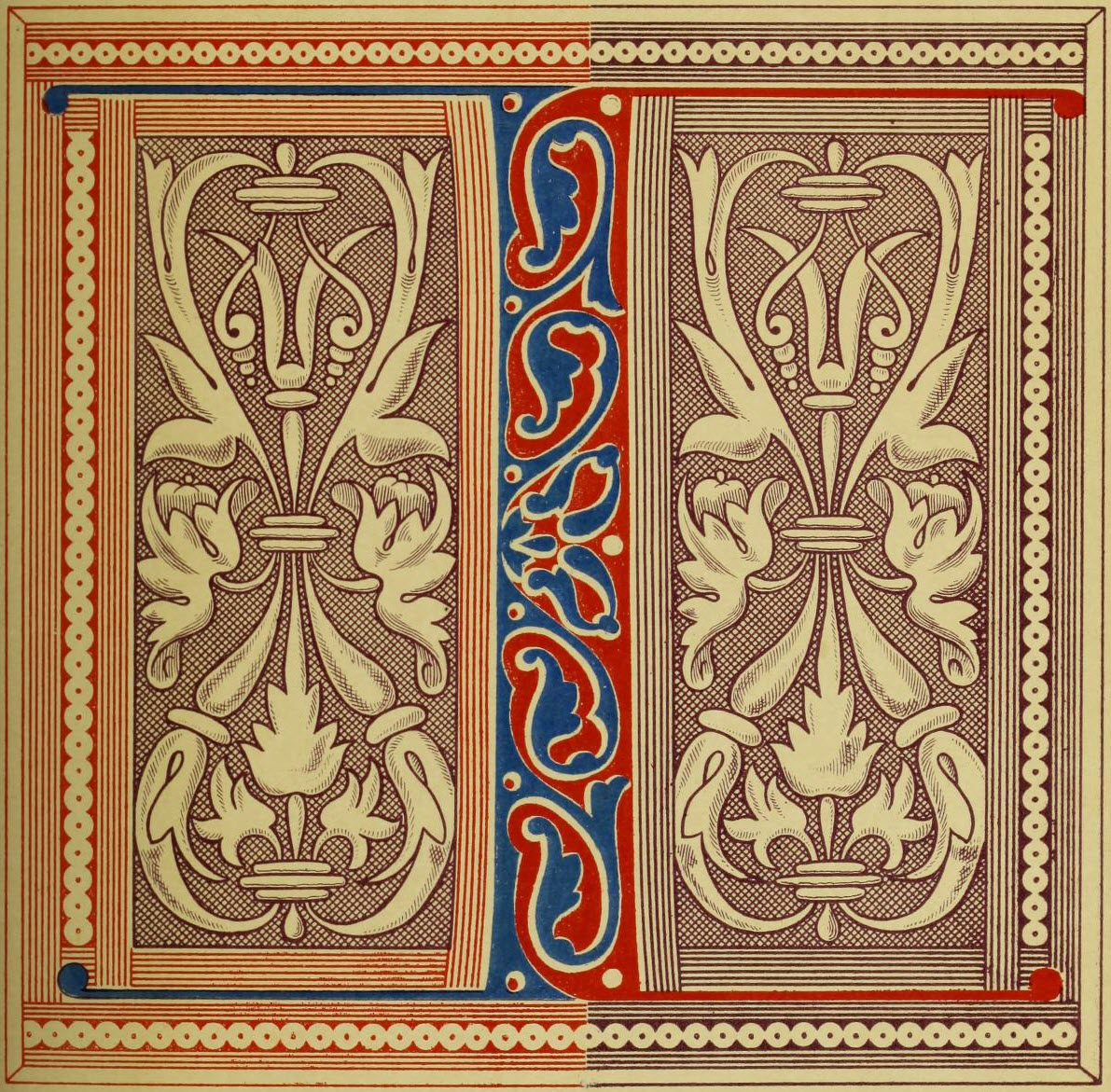
[Detail] The art of illuminating as practiced in Europe from the earliest times (1860)

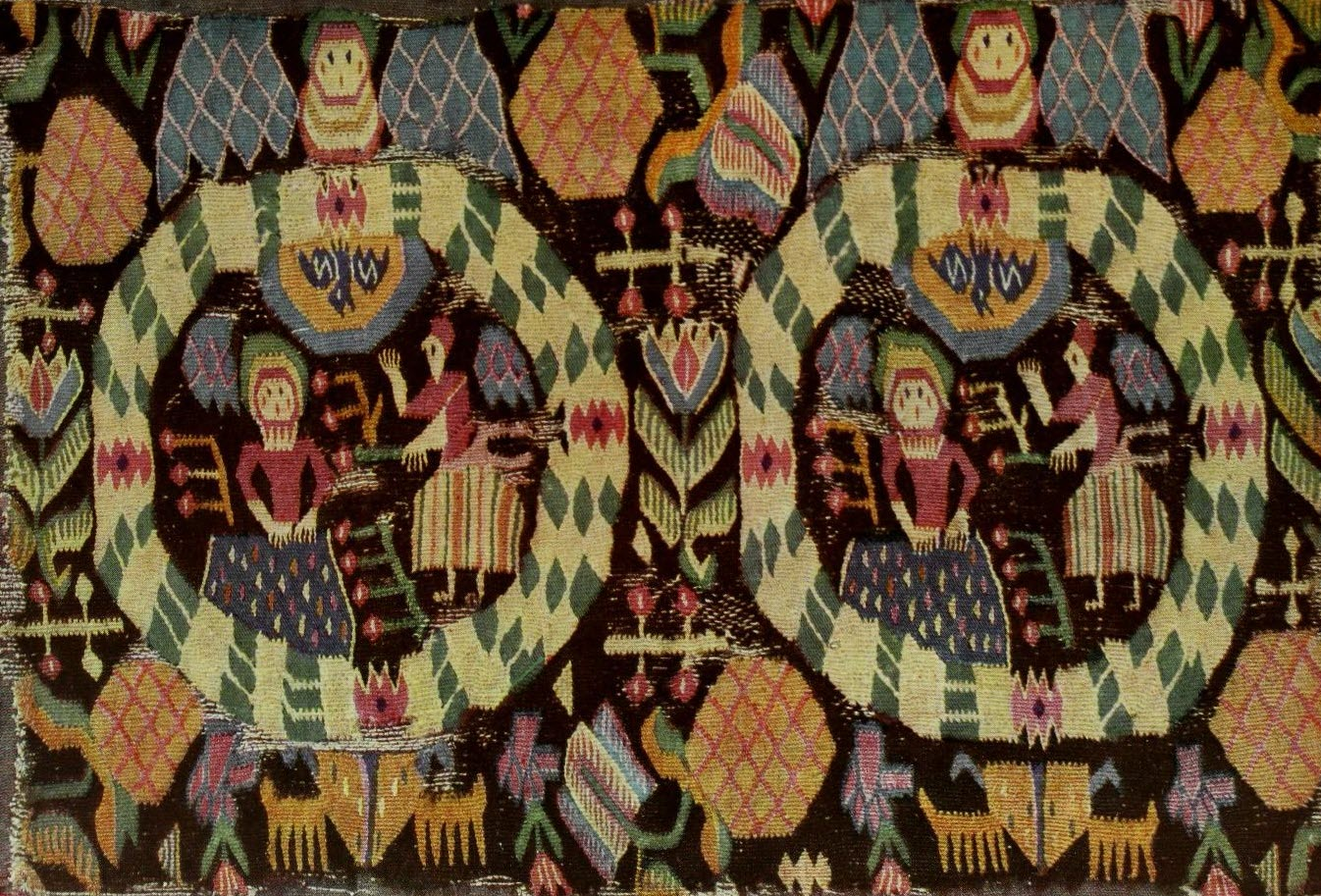
[Detail] Swedish textiles (1925)

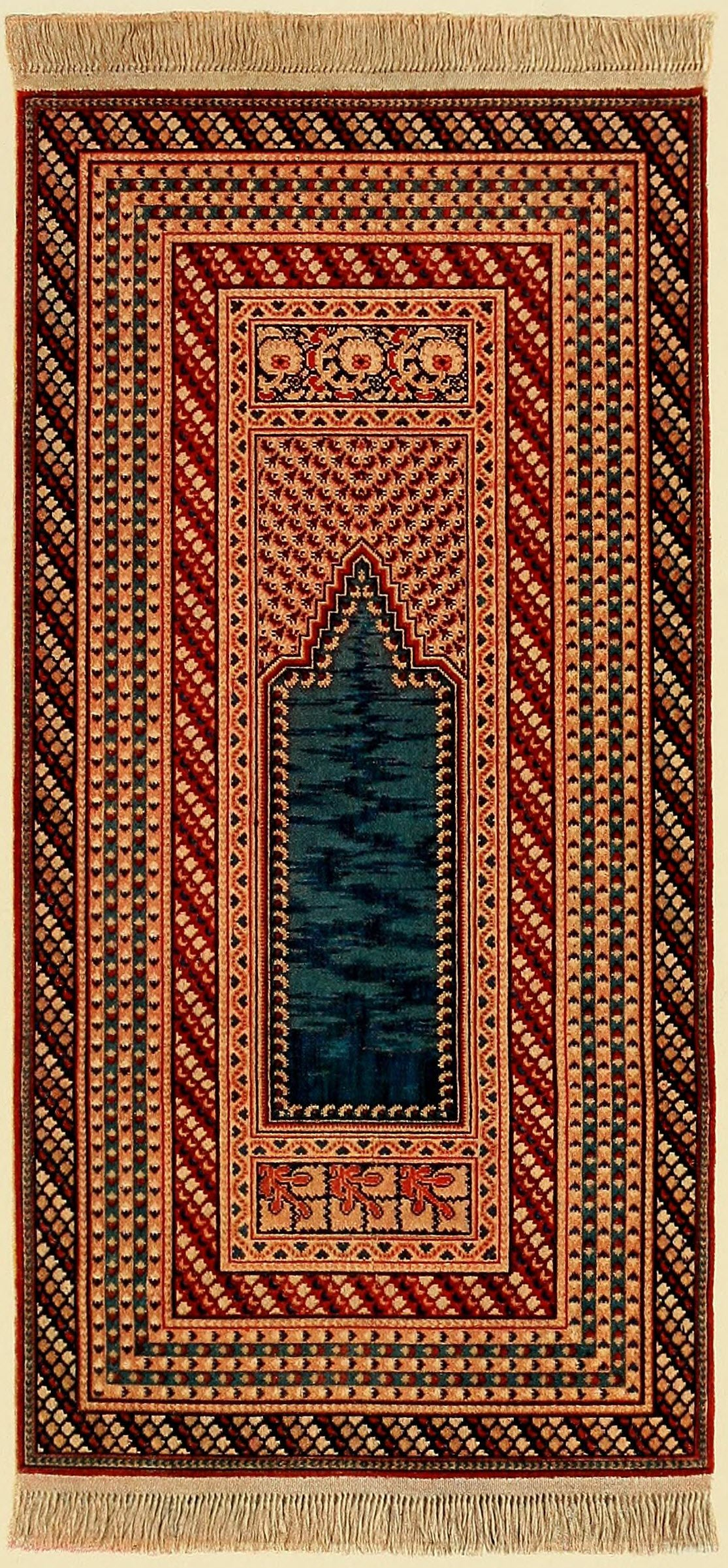
[Detail] Oriental carpets, runners and rugs and some Jacquard reproductions. (1910)

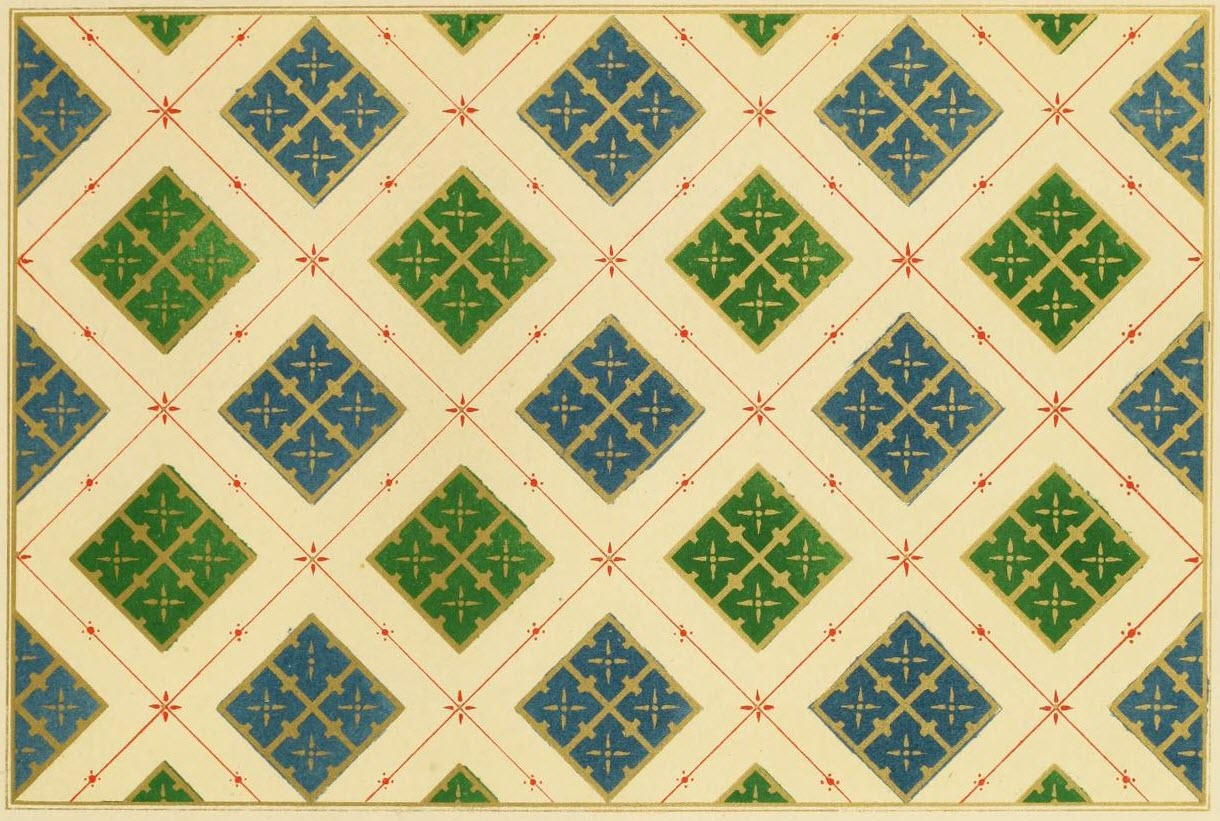
[Detail] Ornamental designs (1861)

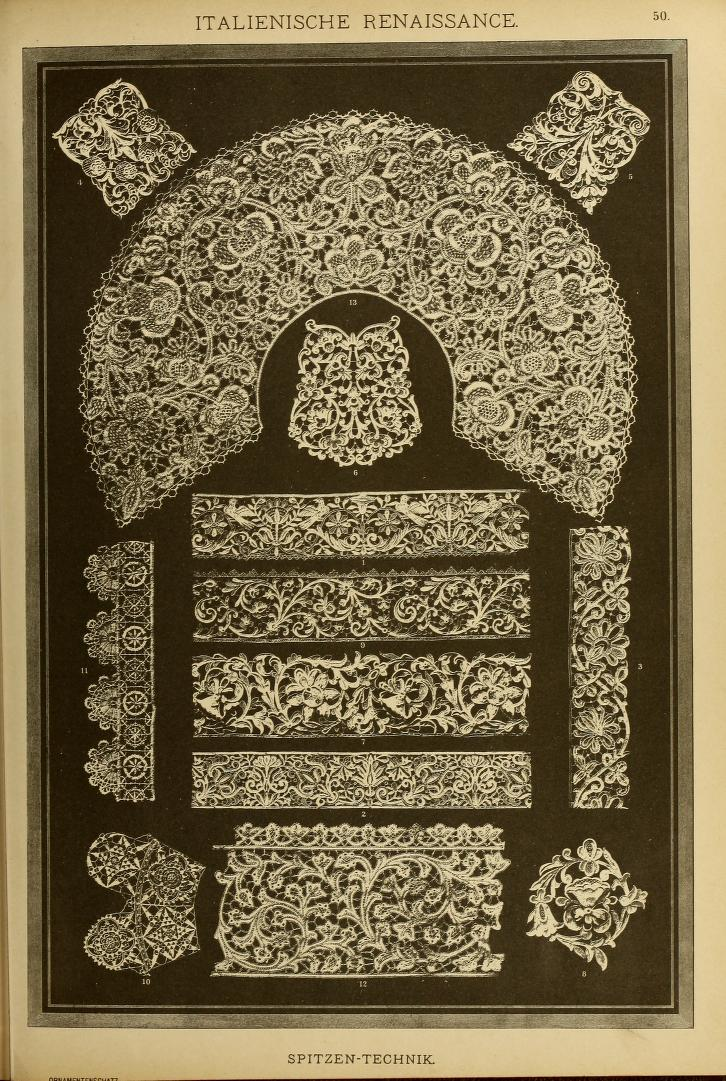
An example of lace from the Italian Renaissance.

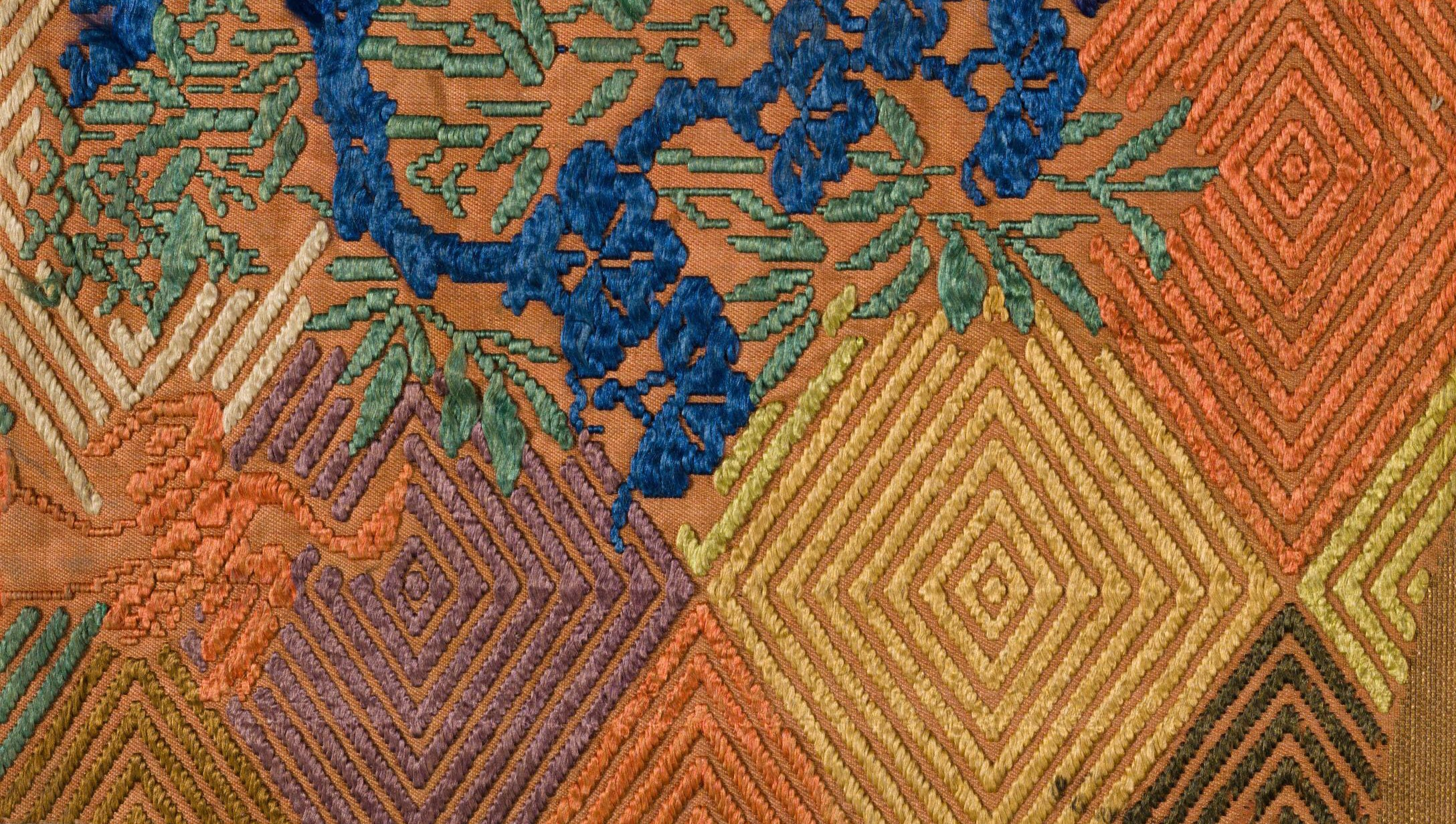
[Detail] Oriental cloth samples.

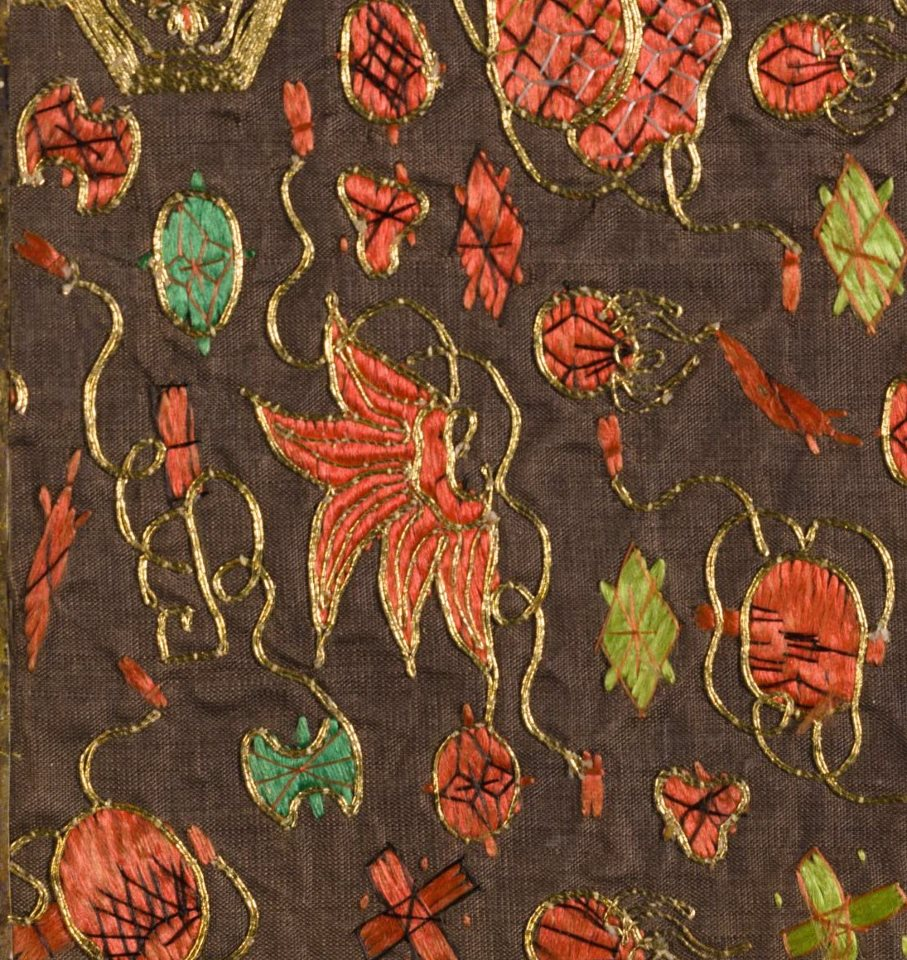
[Detail] Oriental cloth samples.

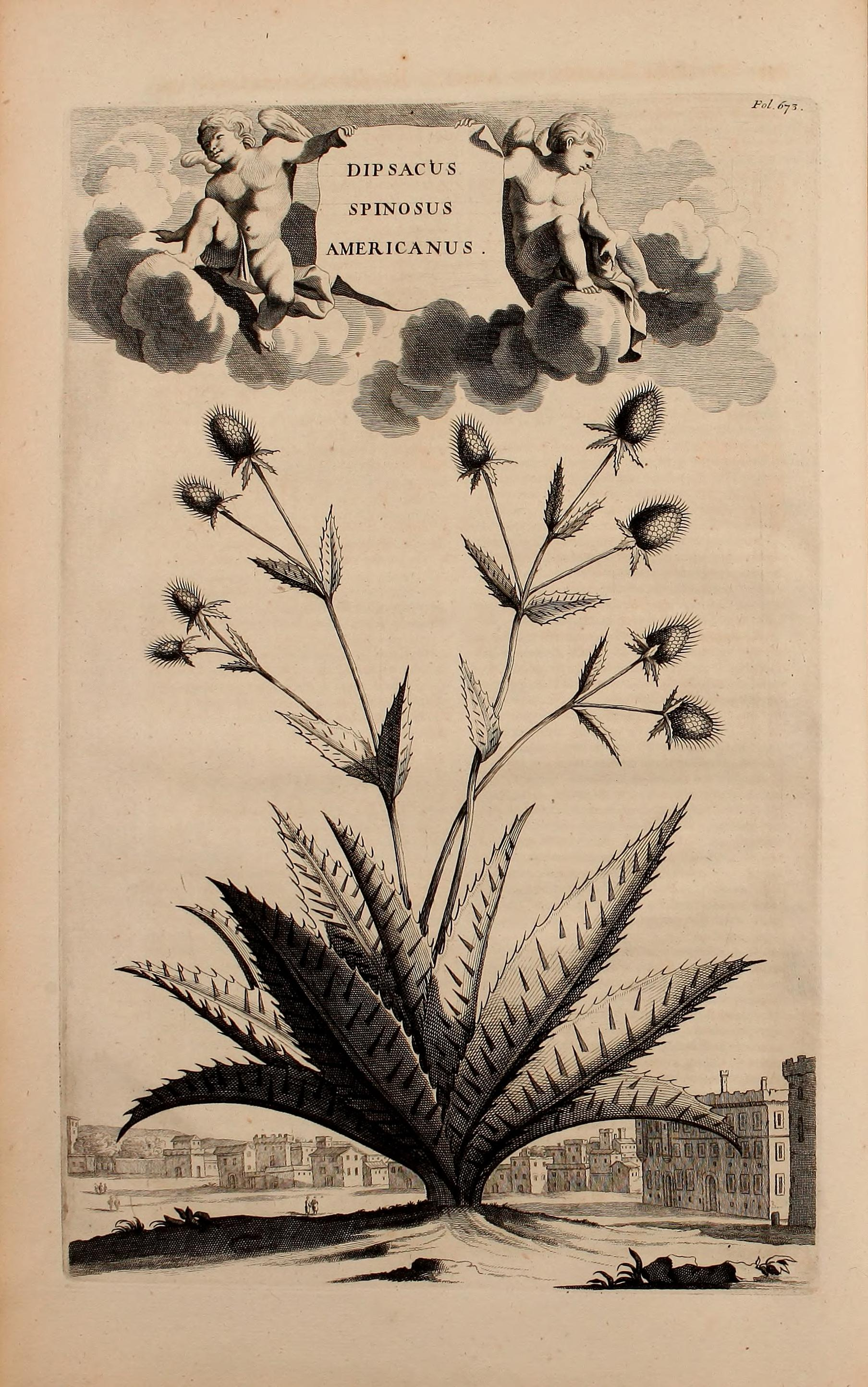
Dipsacus Spinosus Americanus. Naauwkeurige beschryving der aardgewassen, waar in de veelerley aart en bijzondere eigenschappen der boomen, heesters, kruyden, bloemen, met haare vrugten, zaden, wortelen en bollen, neevens derzelver waare voort-teeling, gelukkige aanwinning, en heylzaame genees-krachten ... beschreeven worden; (1696)

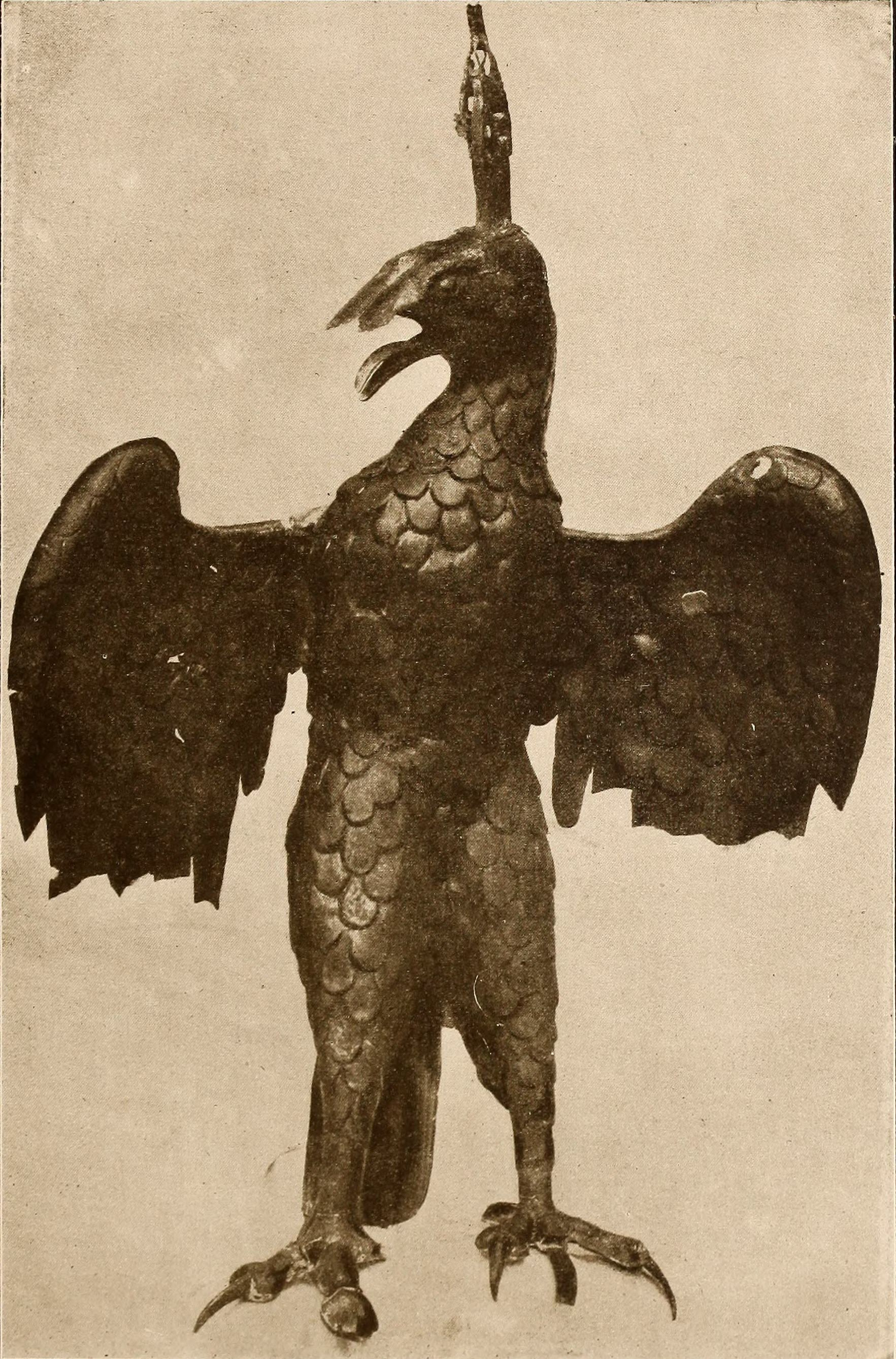
[Detail] Insegna dell'Arte della lana. S. Miniato (Firenze) Il ferro nell'arte italiana; (1910)

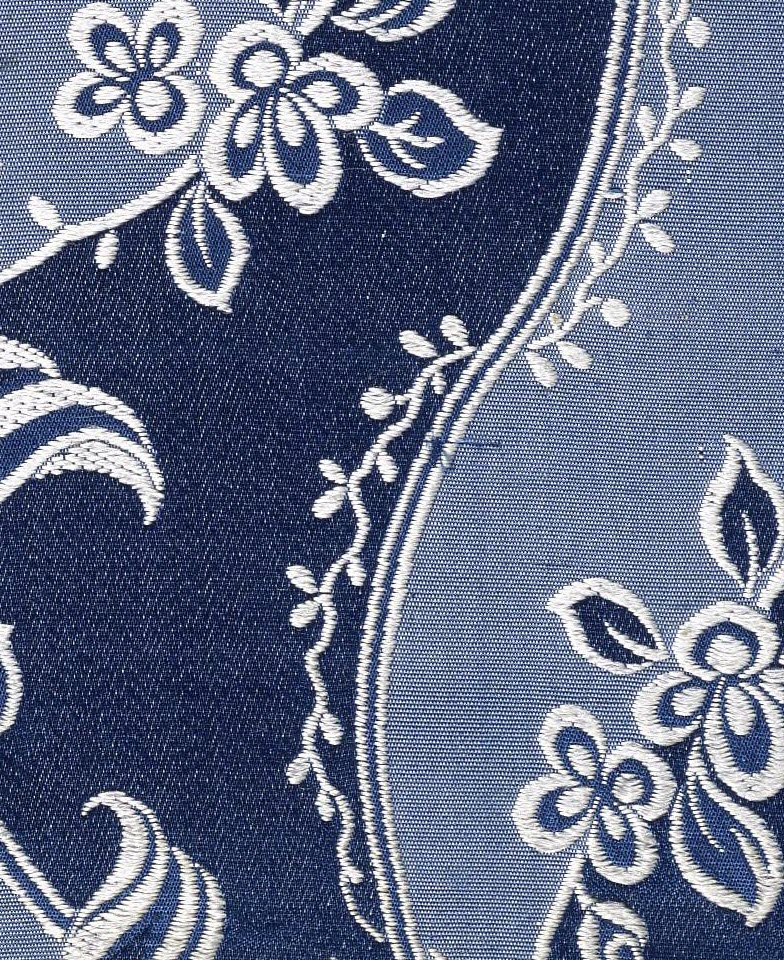
[Detail] Pattern book of silks and damasks (1700)

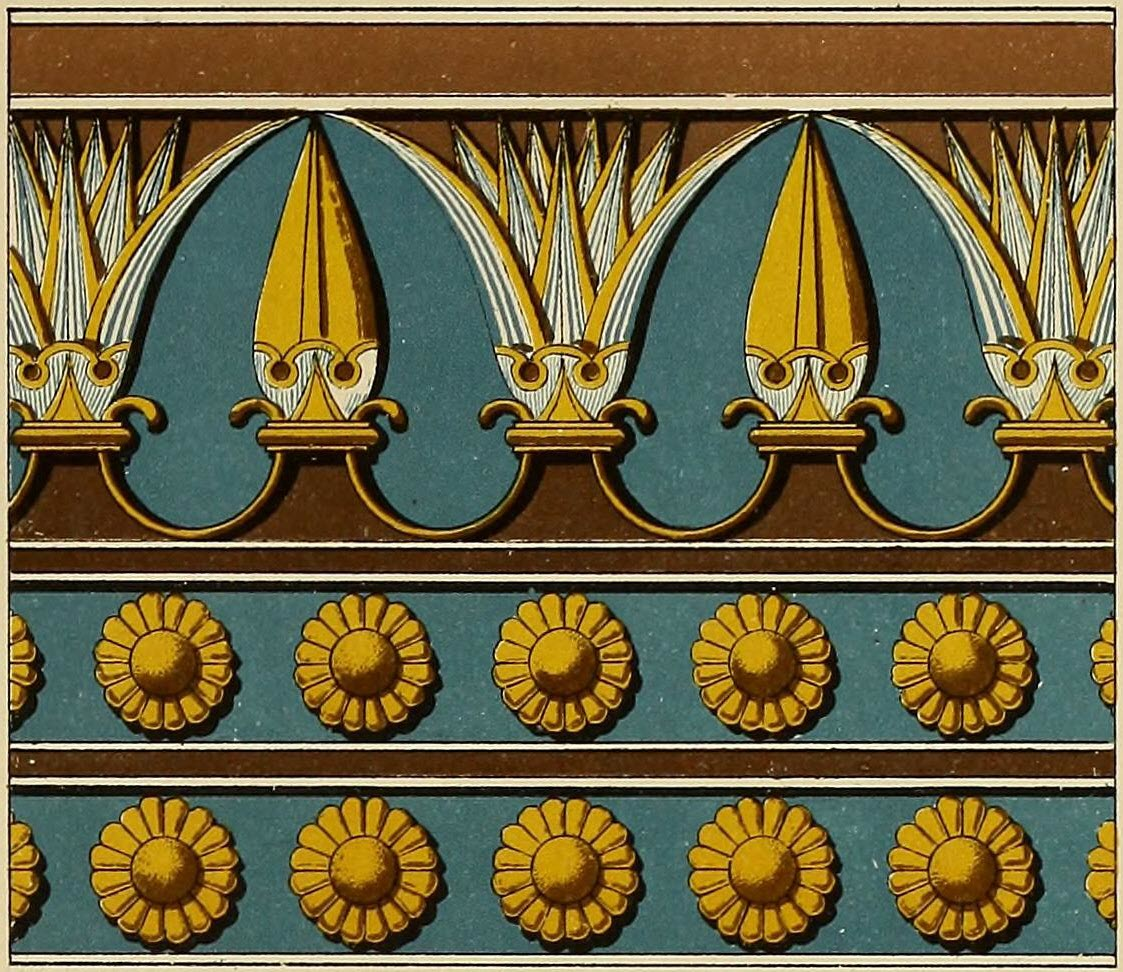
[Detail] Der Ornamentenschatz; ein Musterbuch stilvoller Ornamente aus allen Kunstepochen (1887)

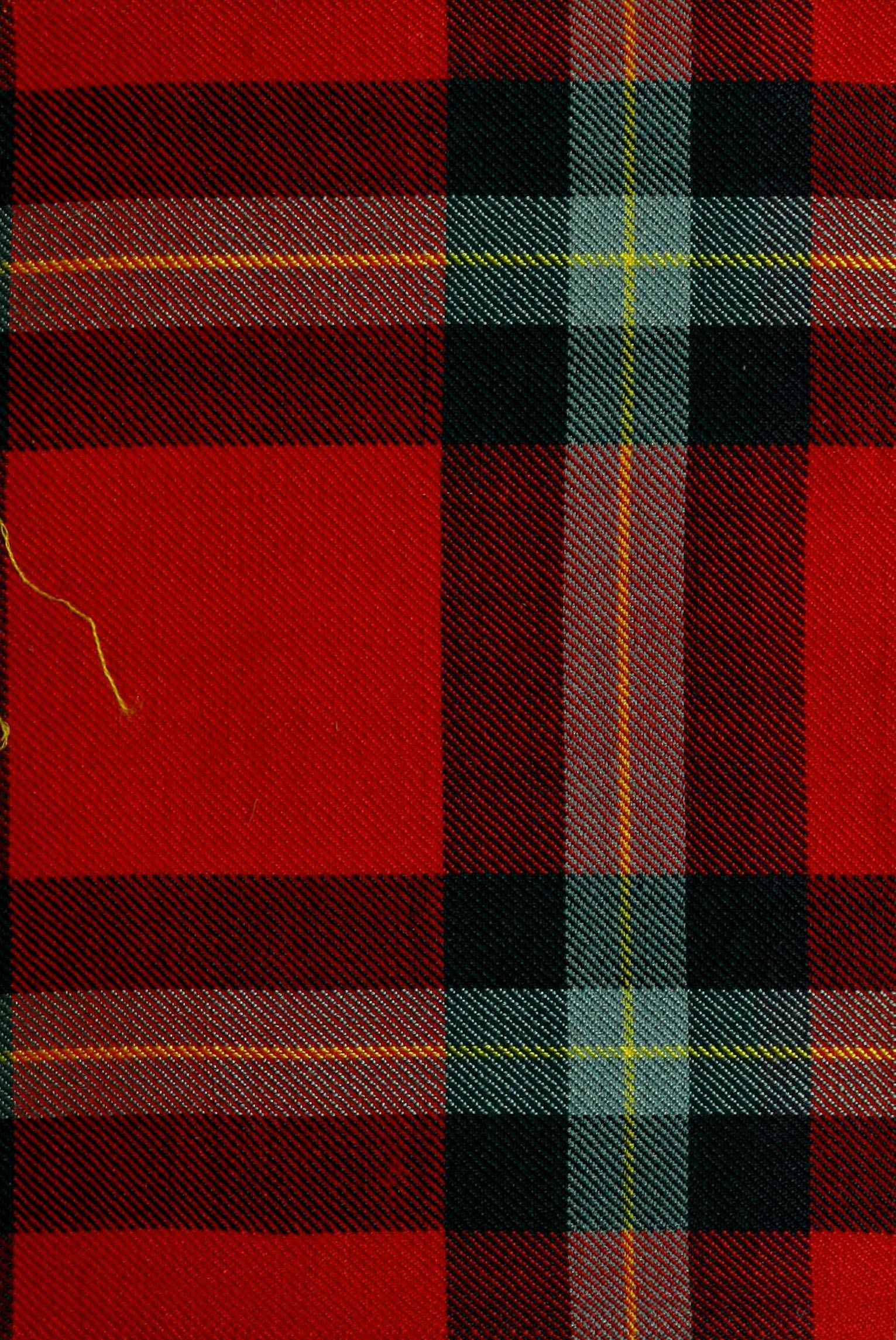
Detail. Mac Laine of Lochbuie. Old and rare Scottish tartans, with historical introduction and descriptive notices (1893)

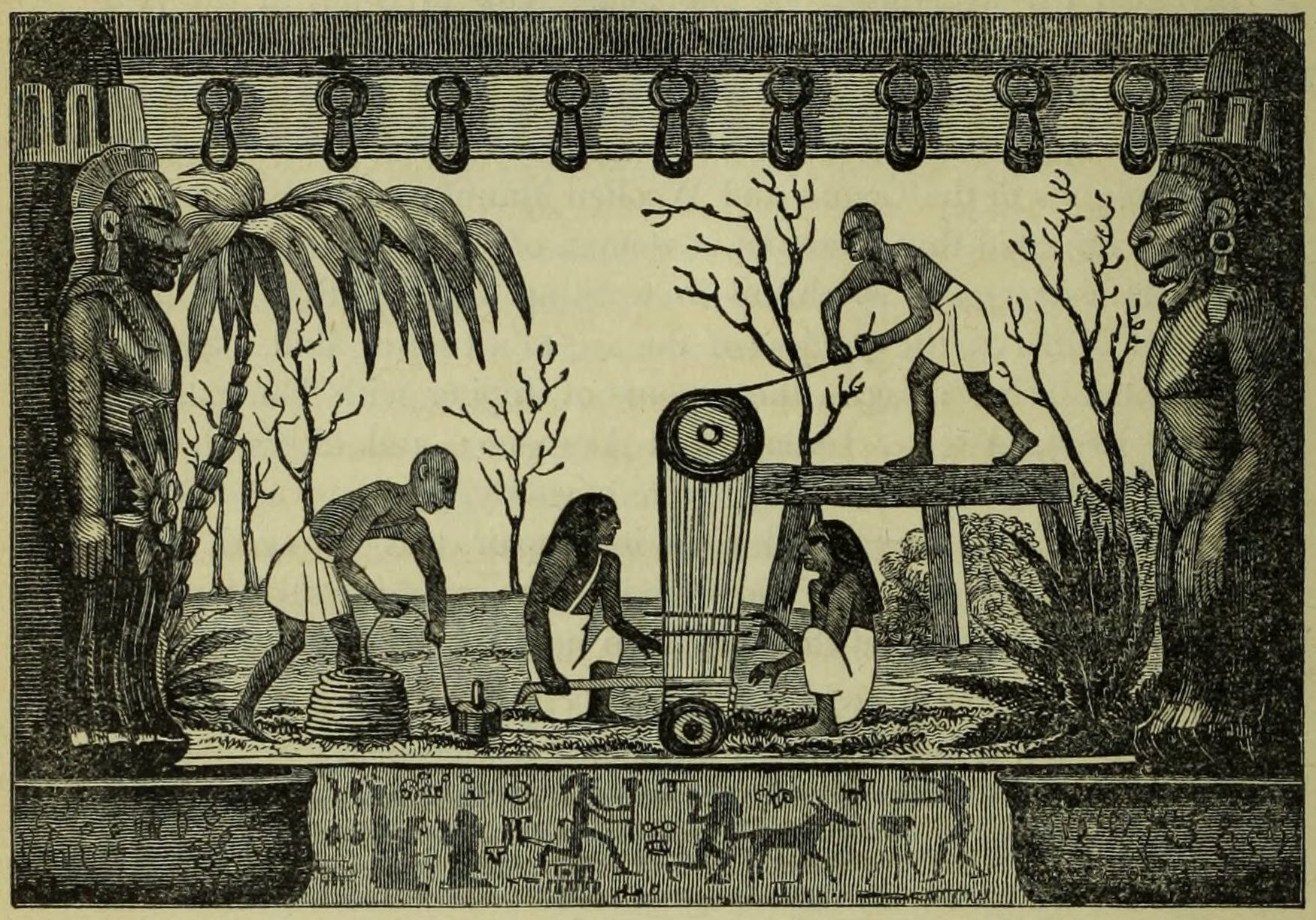
[Detail] The art of weaving, by hand and by power, with an introductory account of its rise and progress in ancient and modern times. For the use of manufacturers and others. (1844)

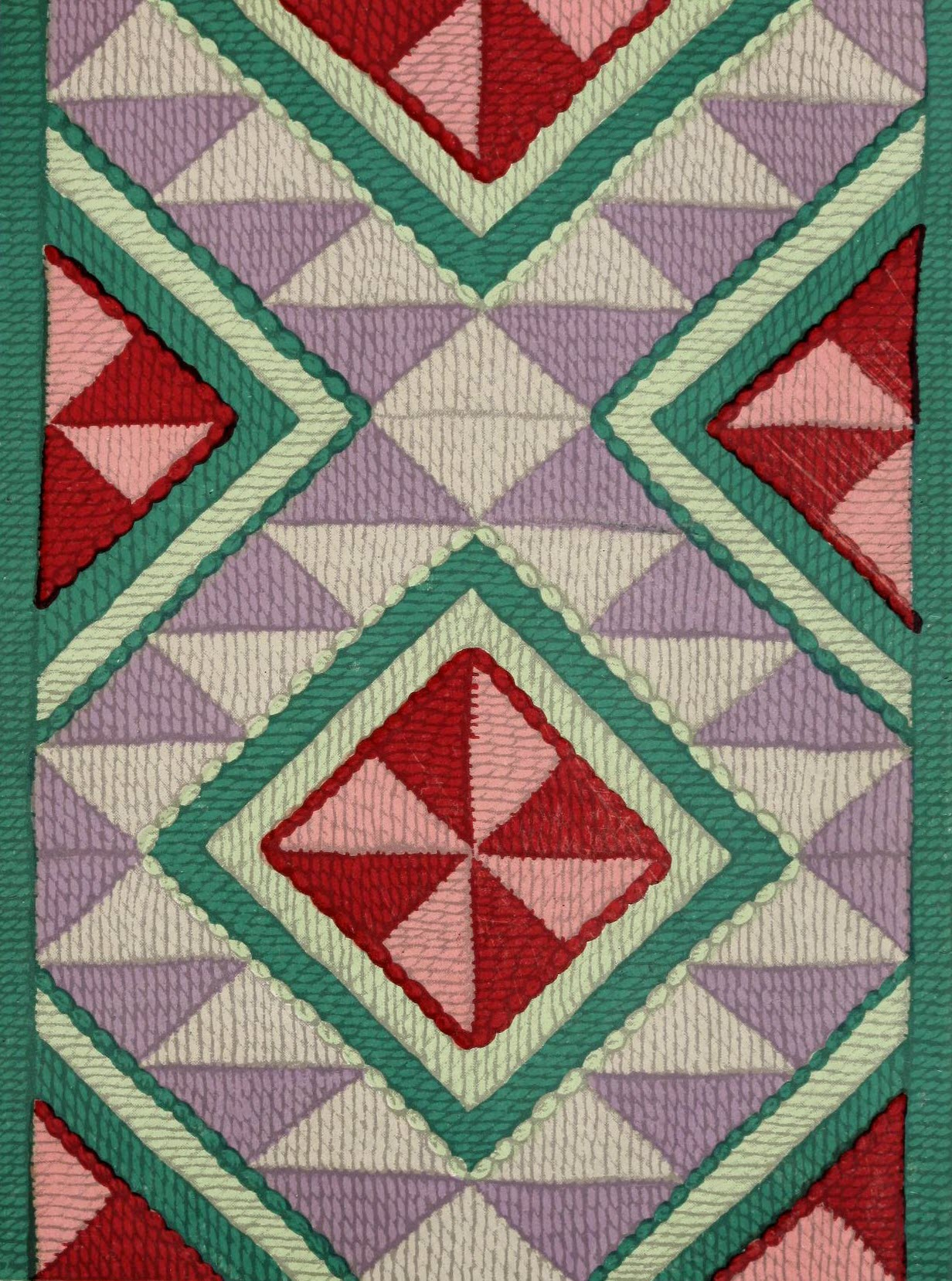
[Detail] A treatise on lace-making, embroidery, and needle-work... (1892-[1900])

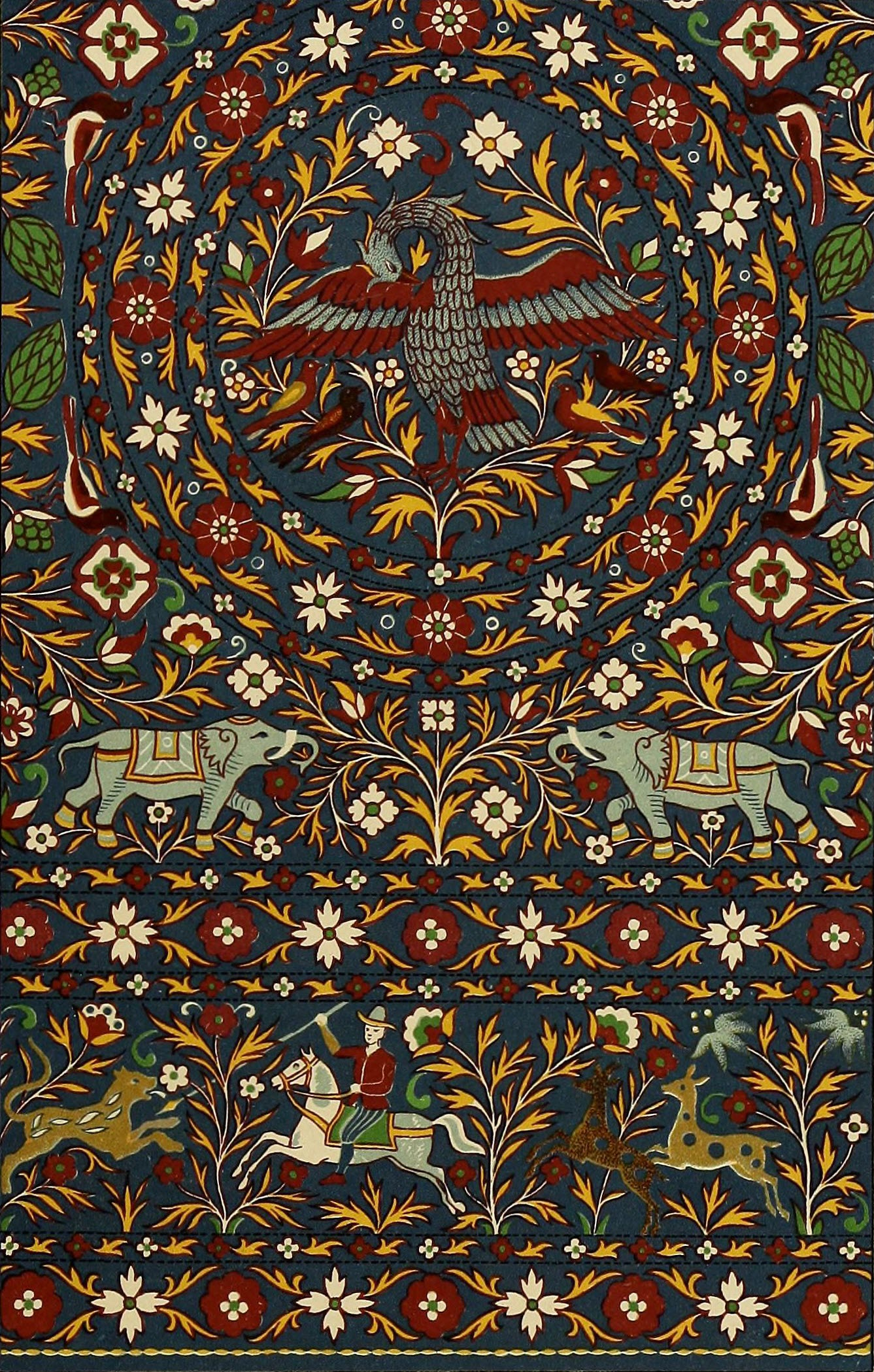
[Detail] Der Ornamentenschatz; ein Musterbuch stilvoller Ornamente aus allen Kunstepochen (1887)

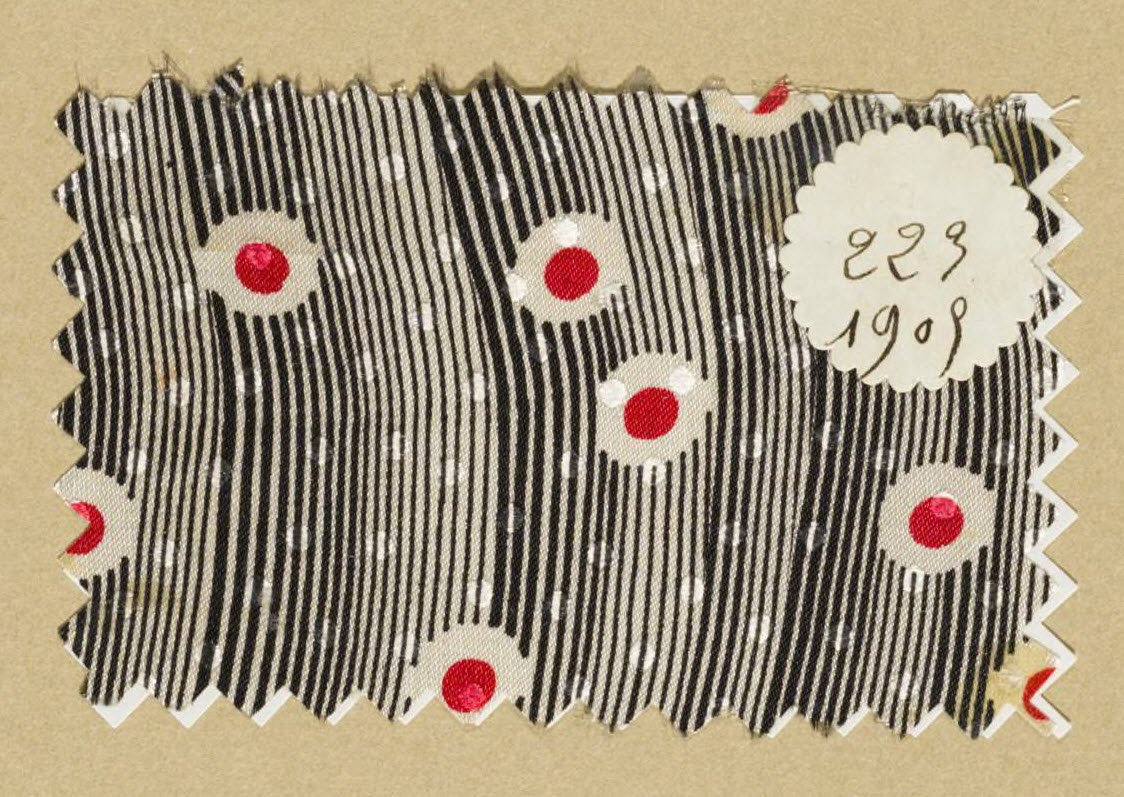
Fabric sample from 'Collection Empire' (20th century).

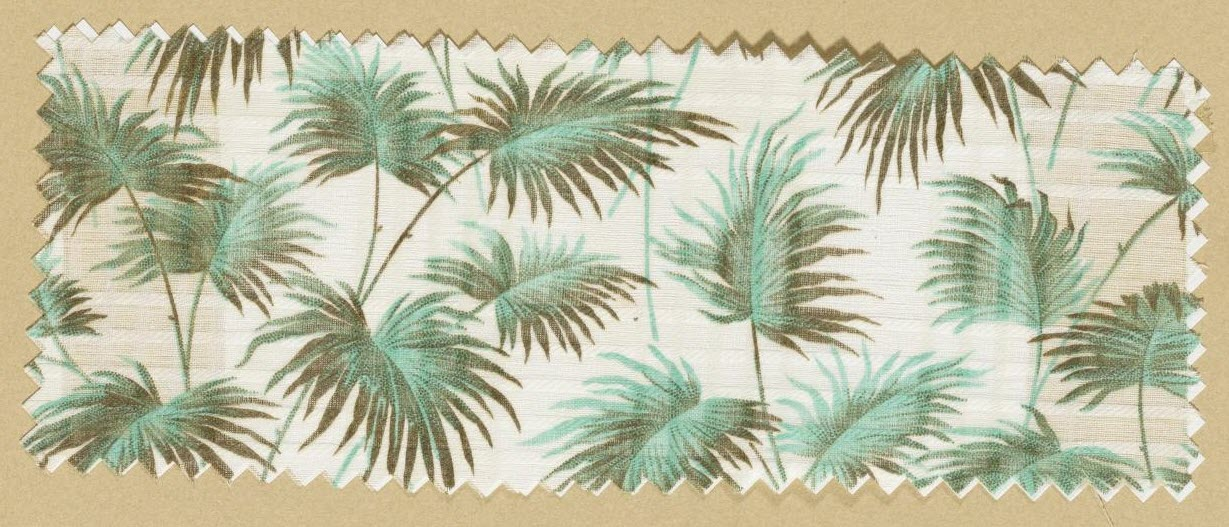
Fabric sample from 'Collection Empire'.

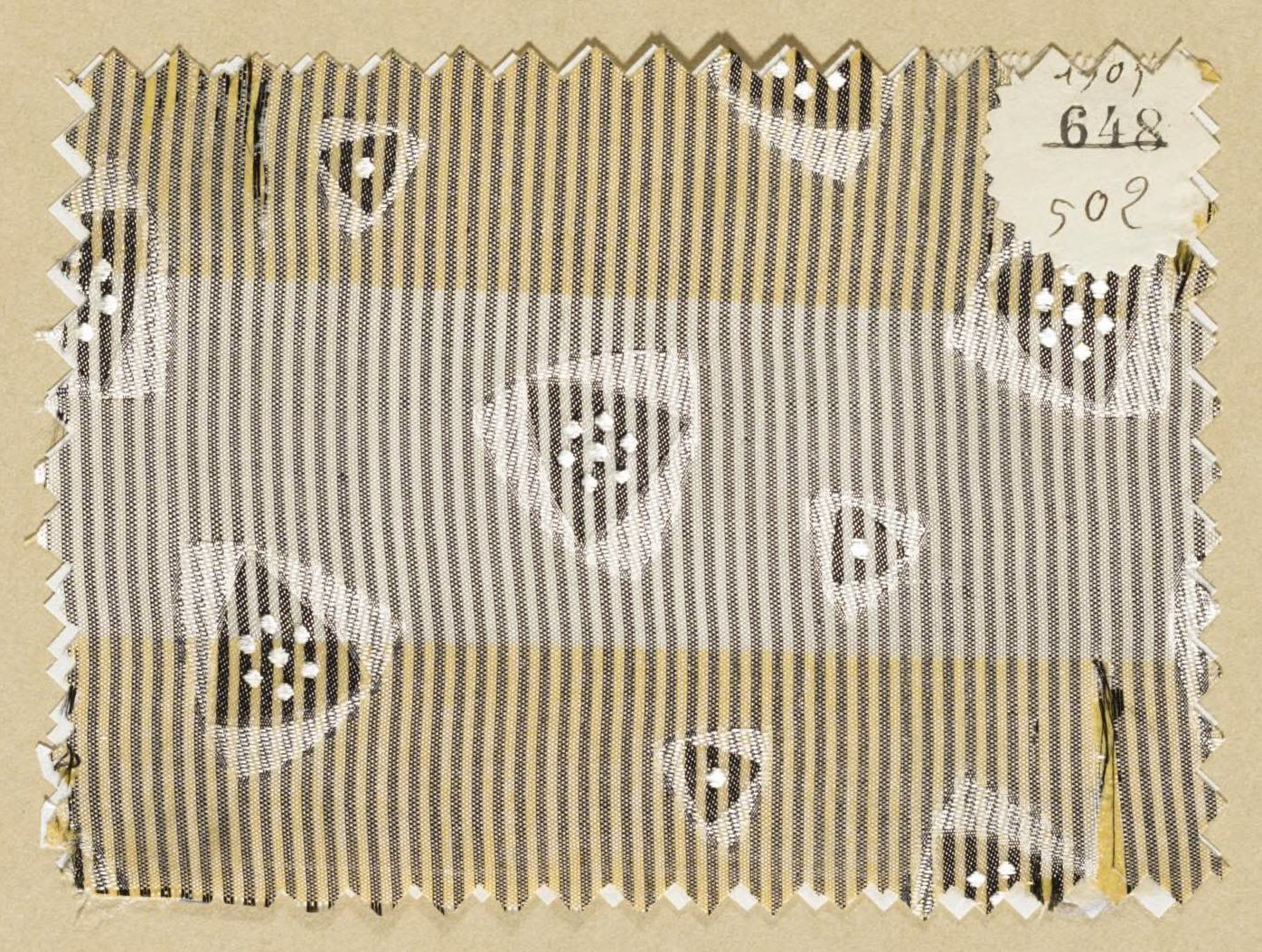
Fabric sample from 'Collection Empire'.

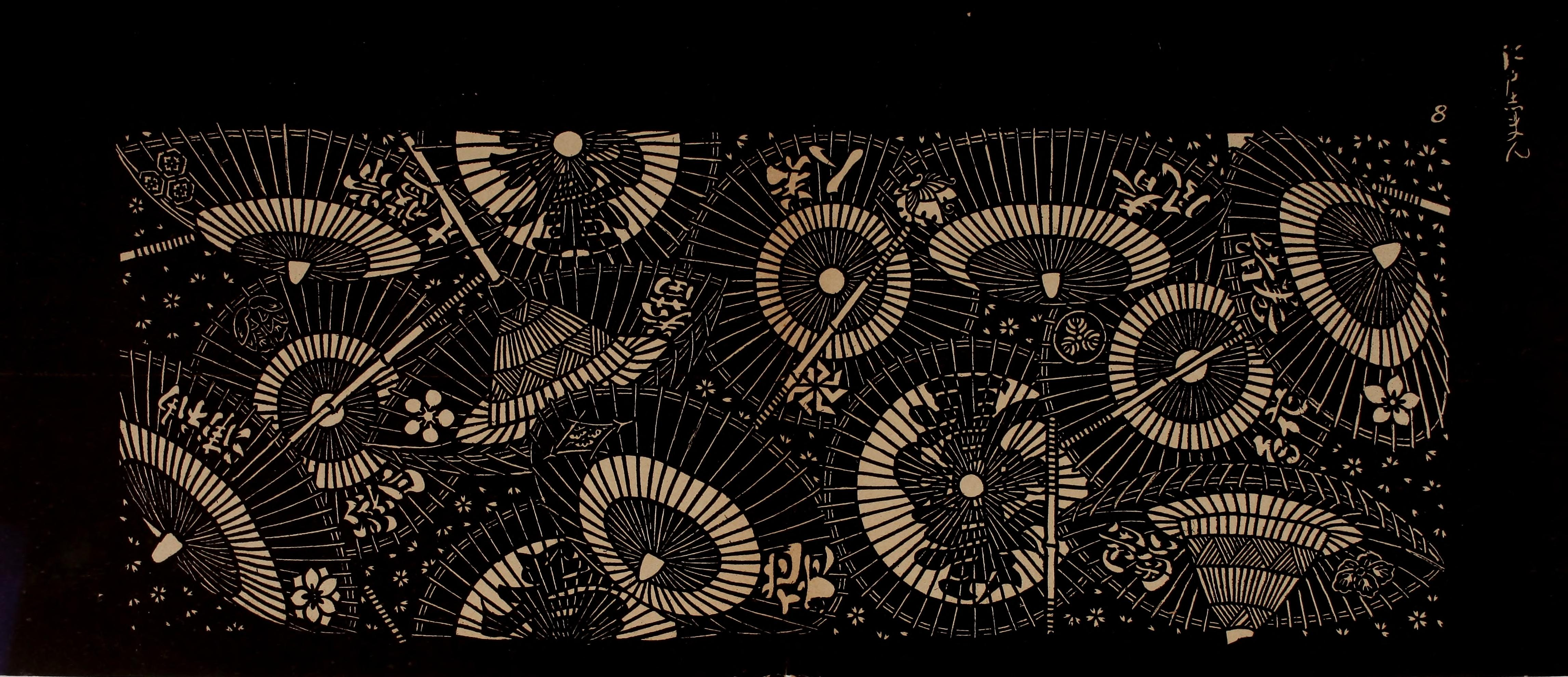
Stencil from 'The book of delightful and strange designs; being one hundred facsimile illustrations of the art of the Japanese stencil-cutter, to which the gentle reader is introduced' (1893).

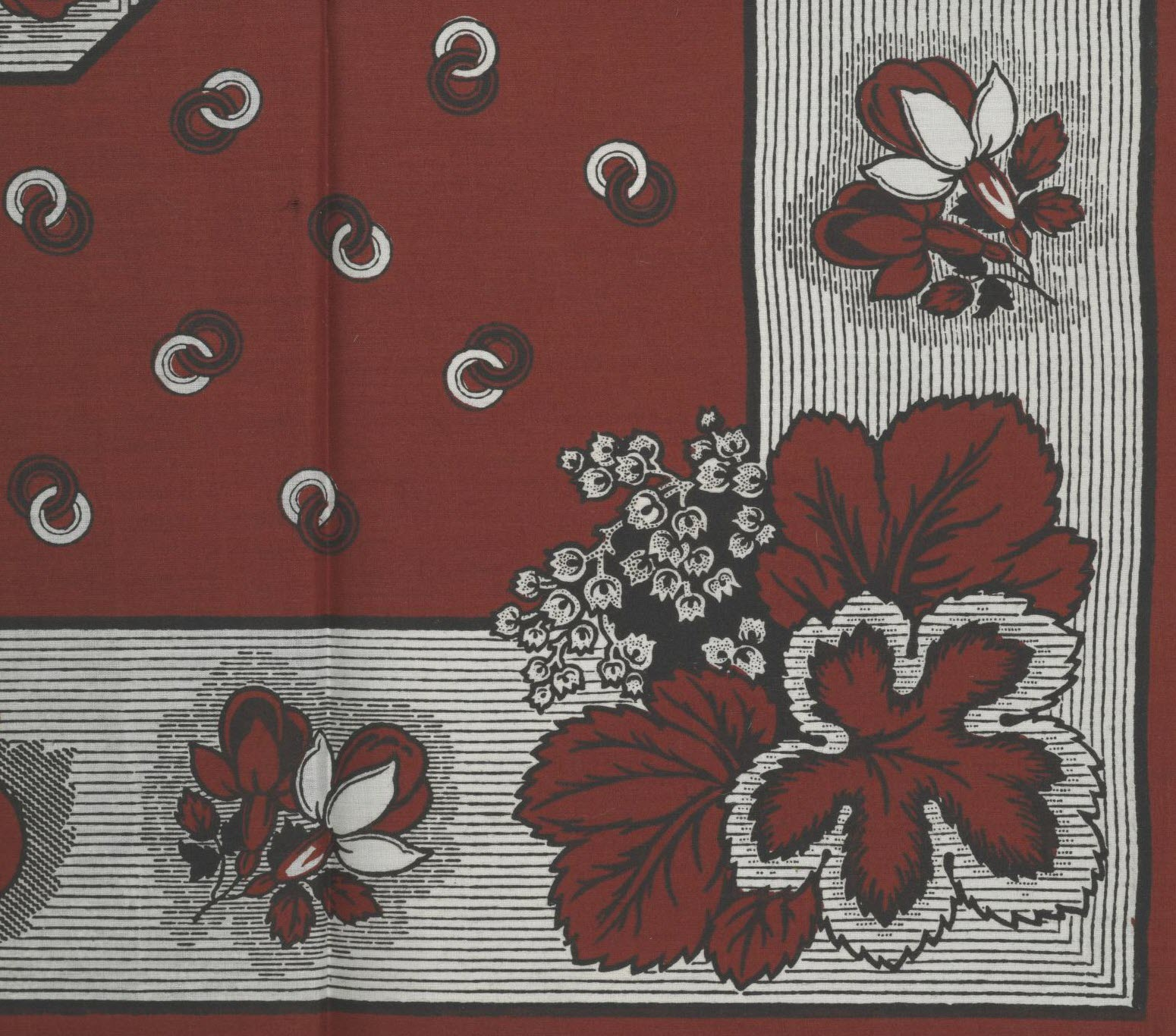
[Detail] [Fabric sample book] (1863).

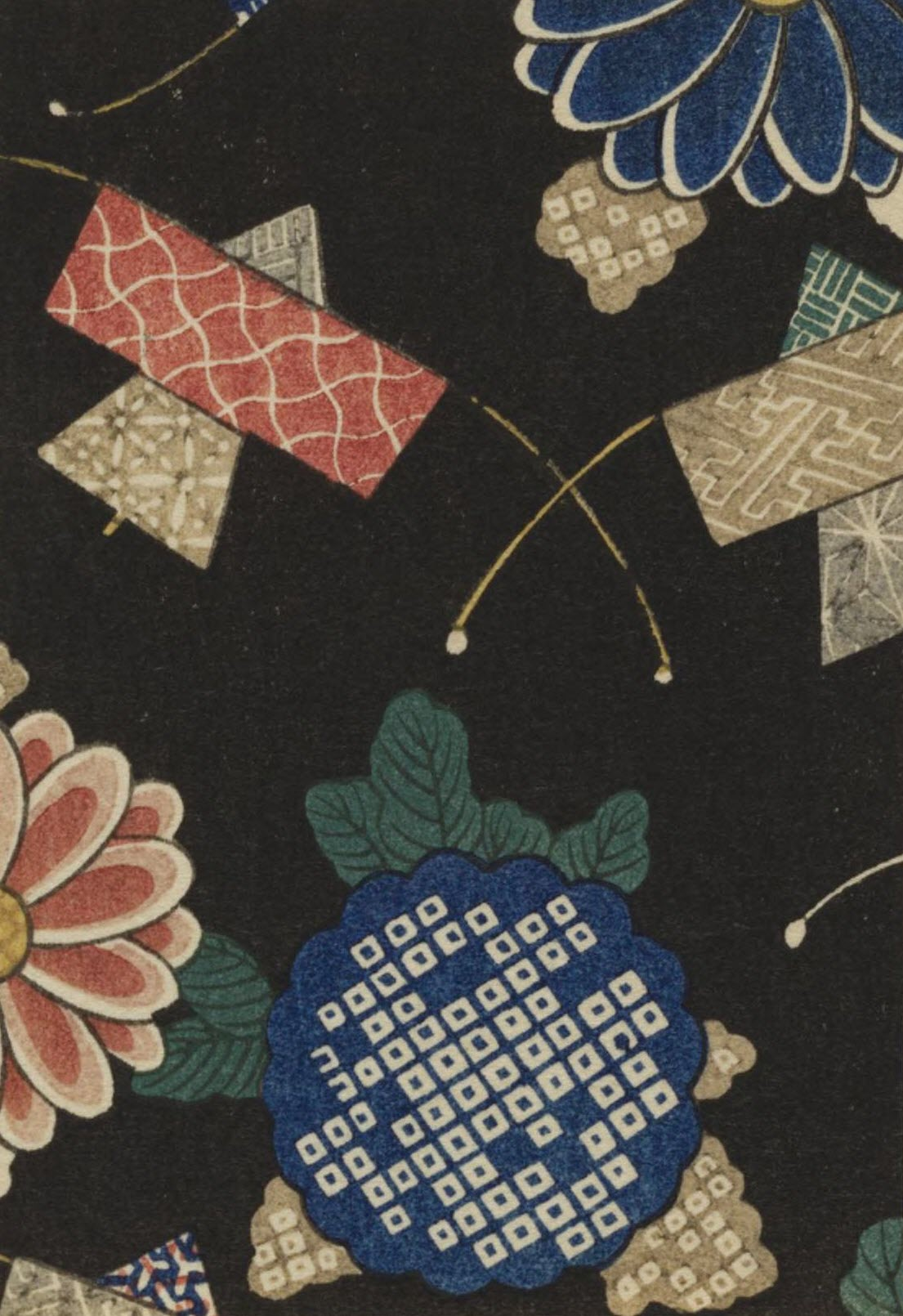
[Detail] Designs selected from Ukiyoe prints (1860).

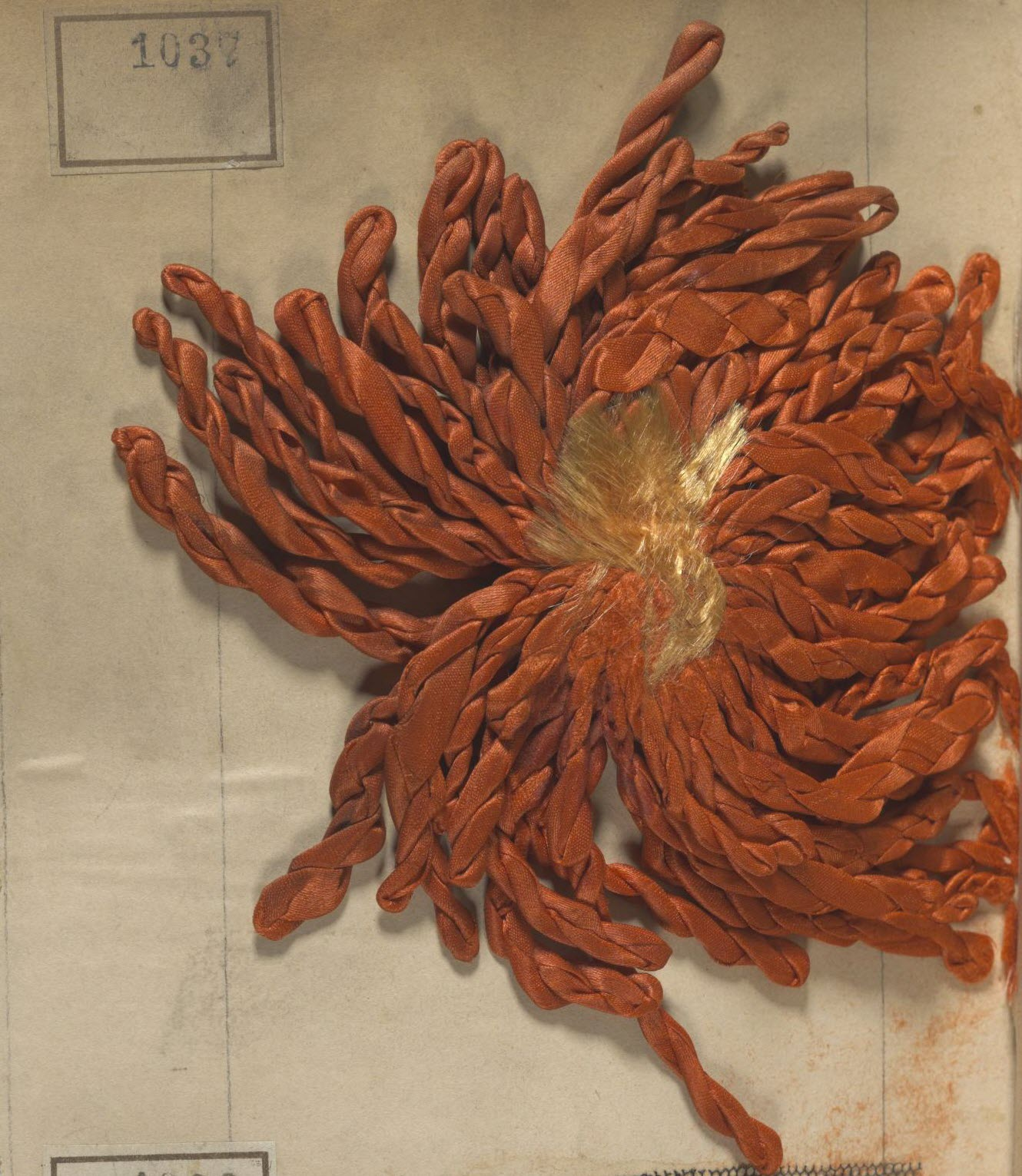
[Detail] [Sample book of trims] (1800).

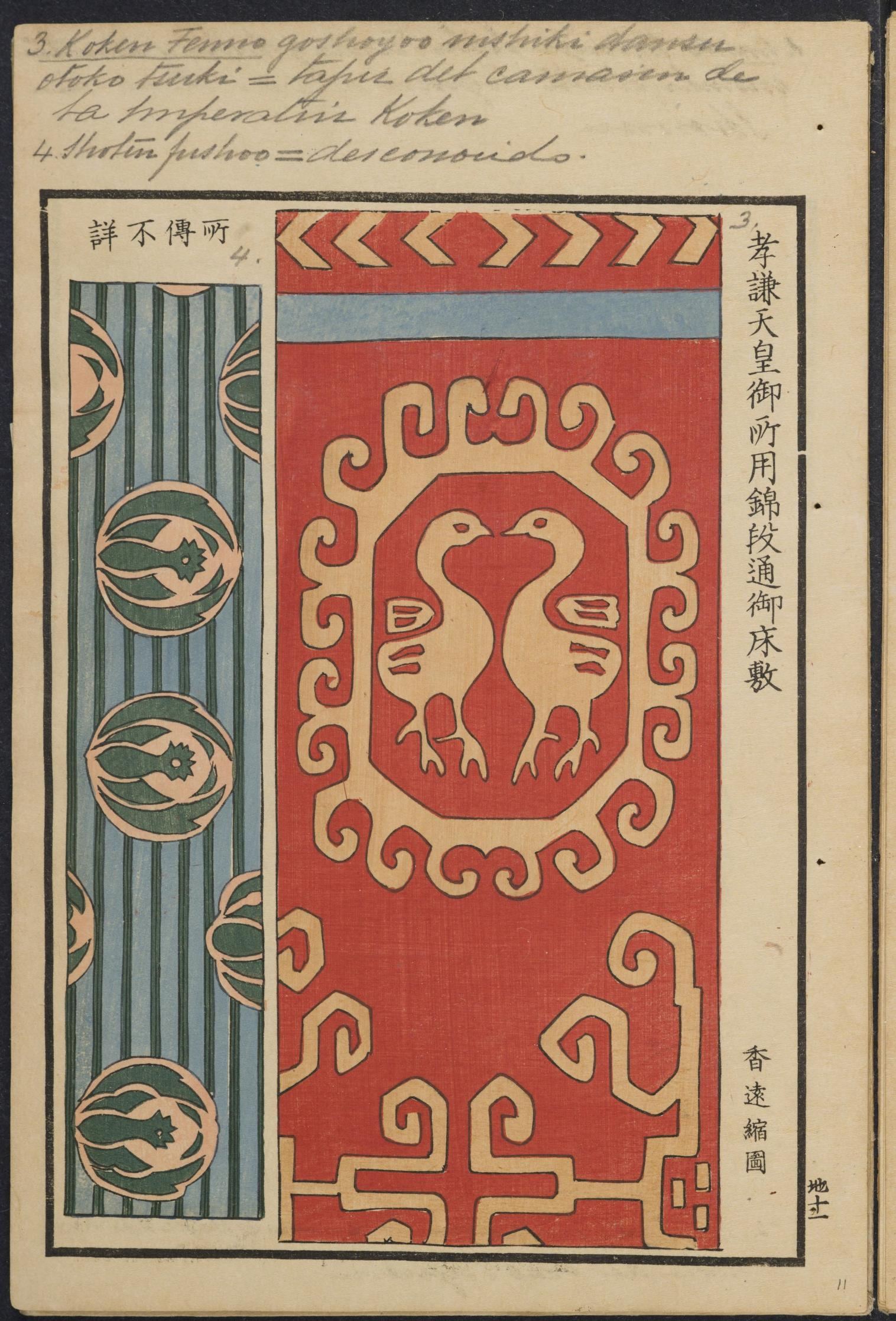
[Detail] "Shinsen Kodaimoyo Kangami.": Nueva serie de modelos de Antiguas telas (1882).

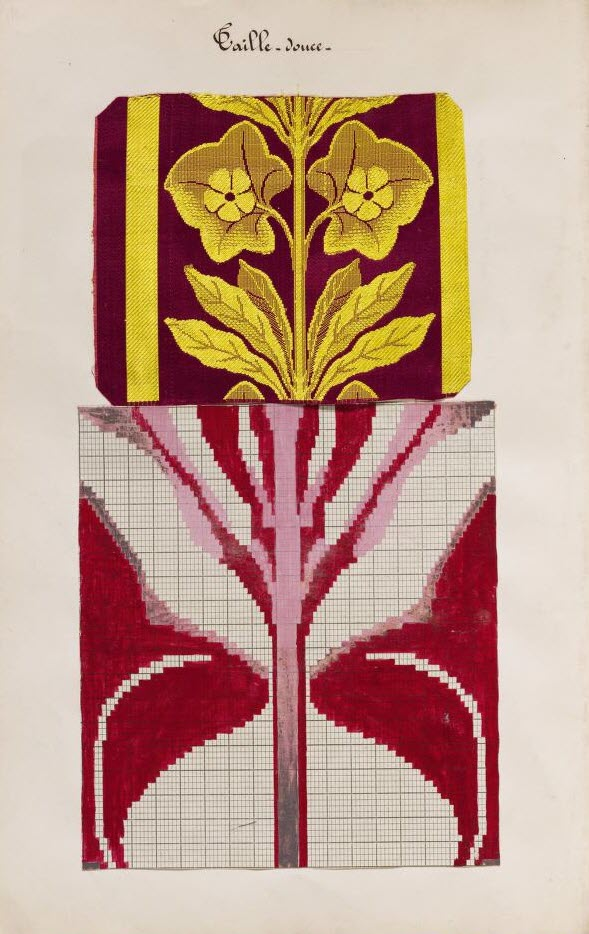
[Detail] [Weaving design book] (1890).

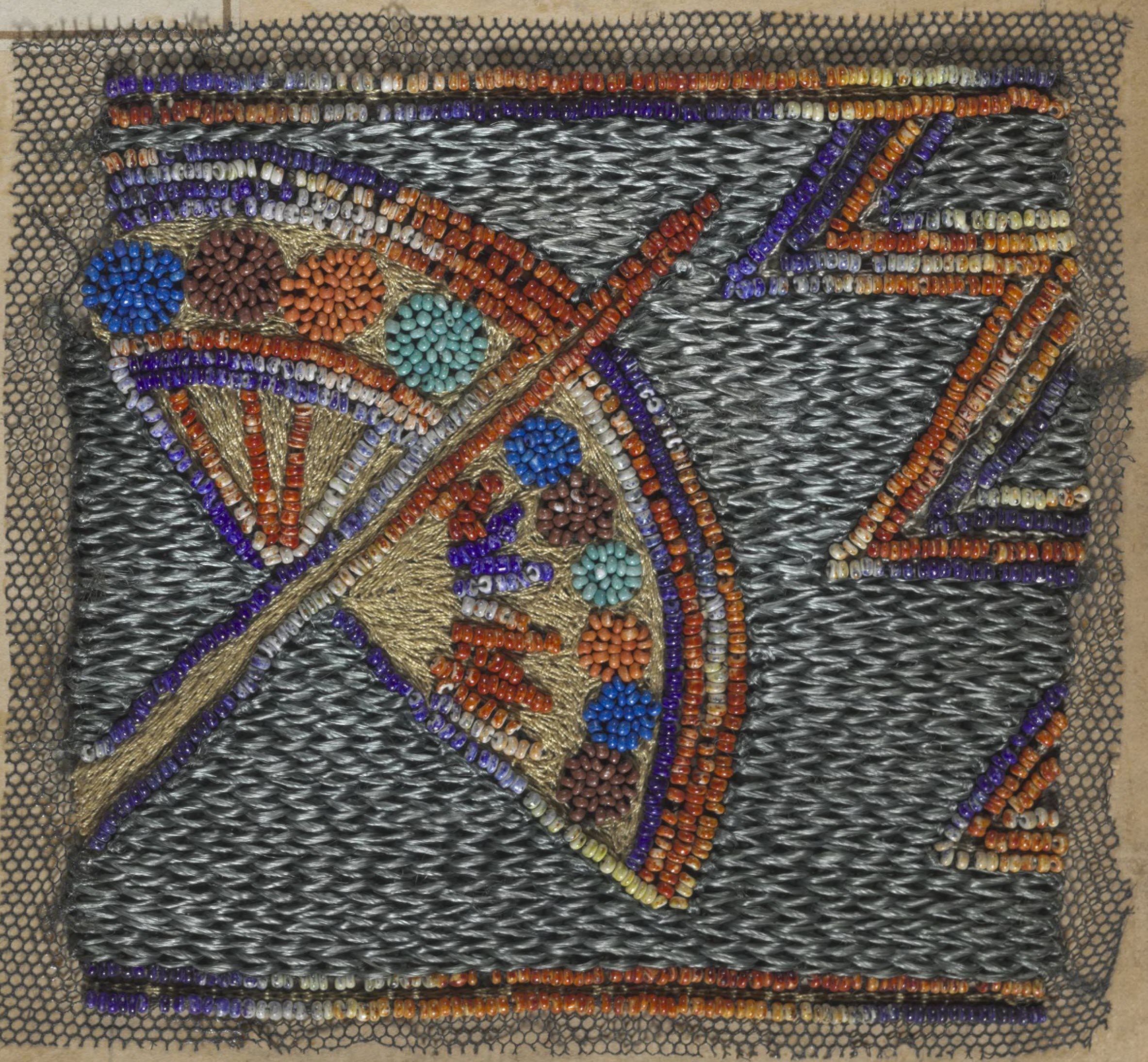
[Detail] [Sample book of trims] (1800).

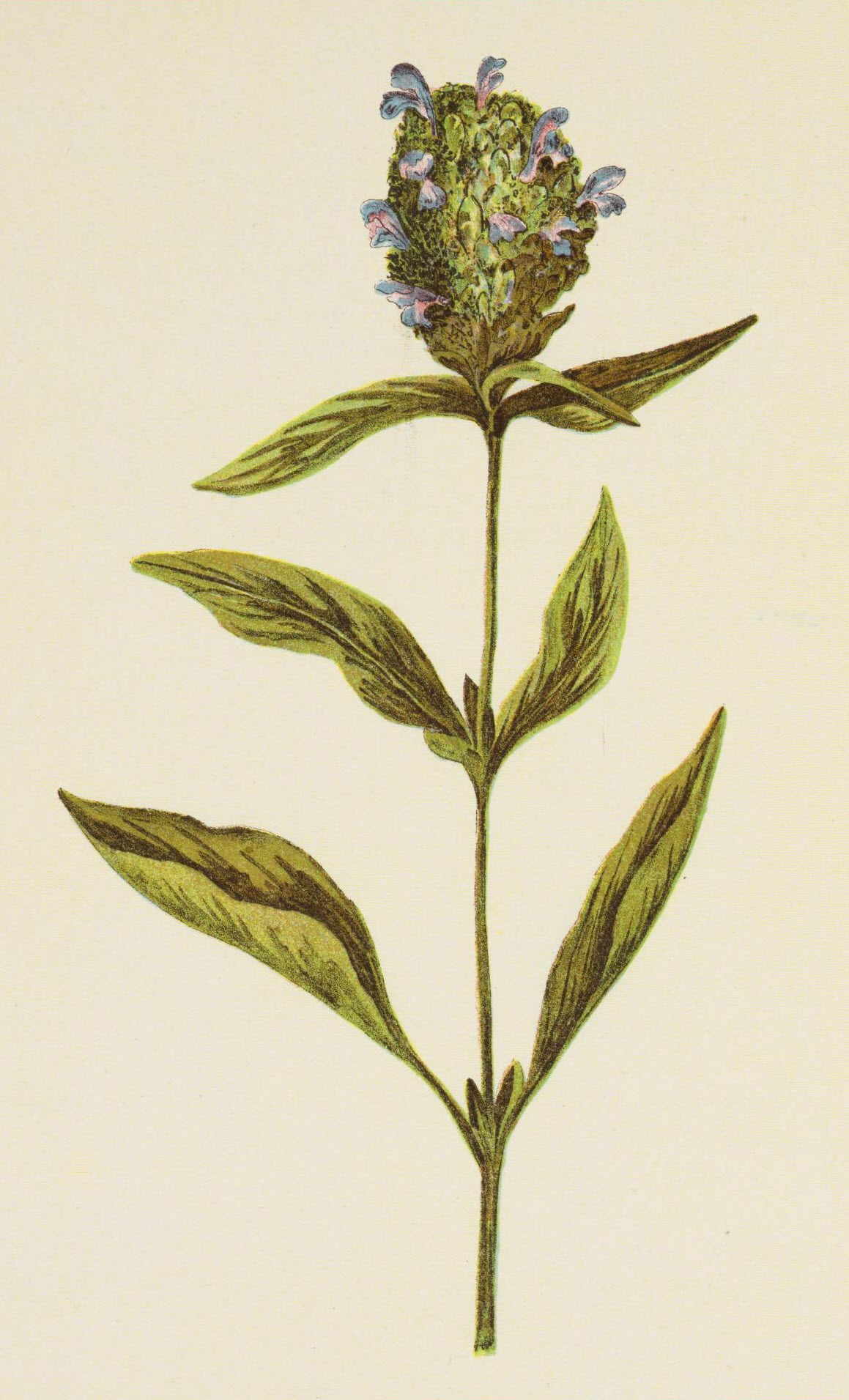
COMMON HEAL-ALL. Wild flowers of America: flowers of every state in the American Union / by a corps of special artists and botanists (1894).

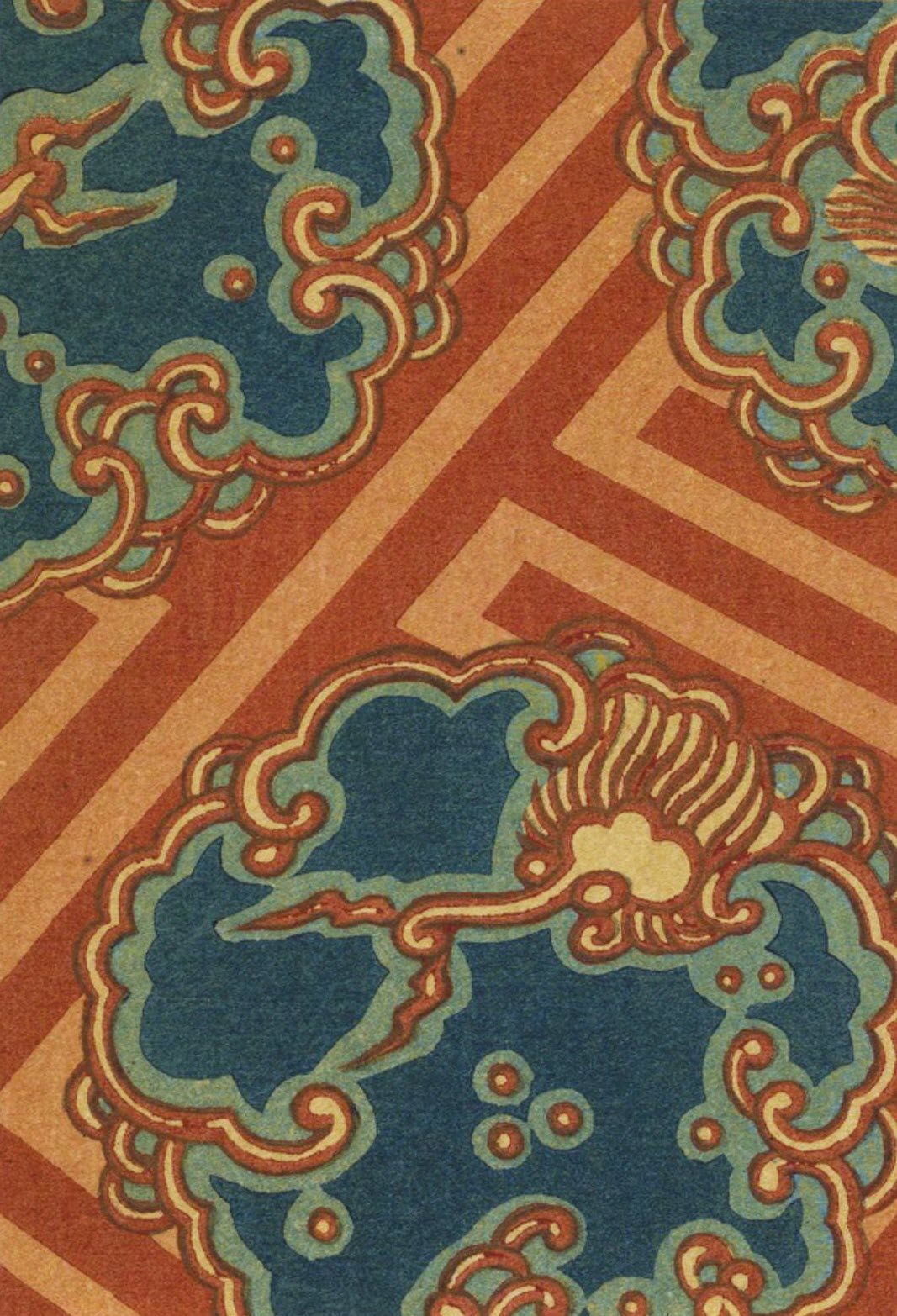
[Detail] Japanese designs from Ukiyoe prints (1800).

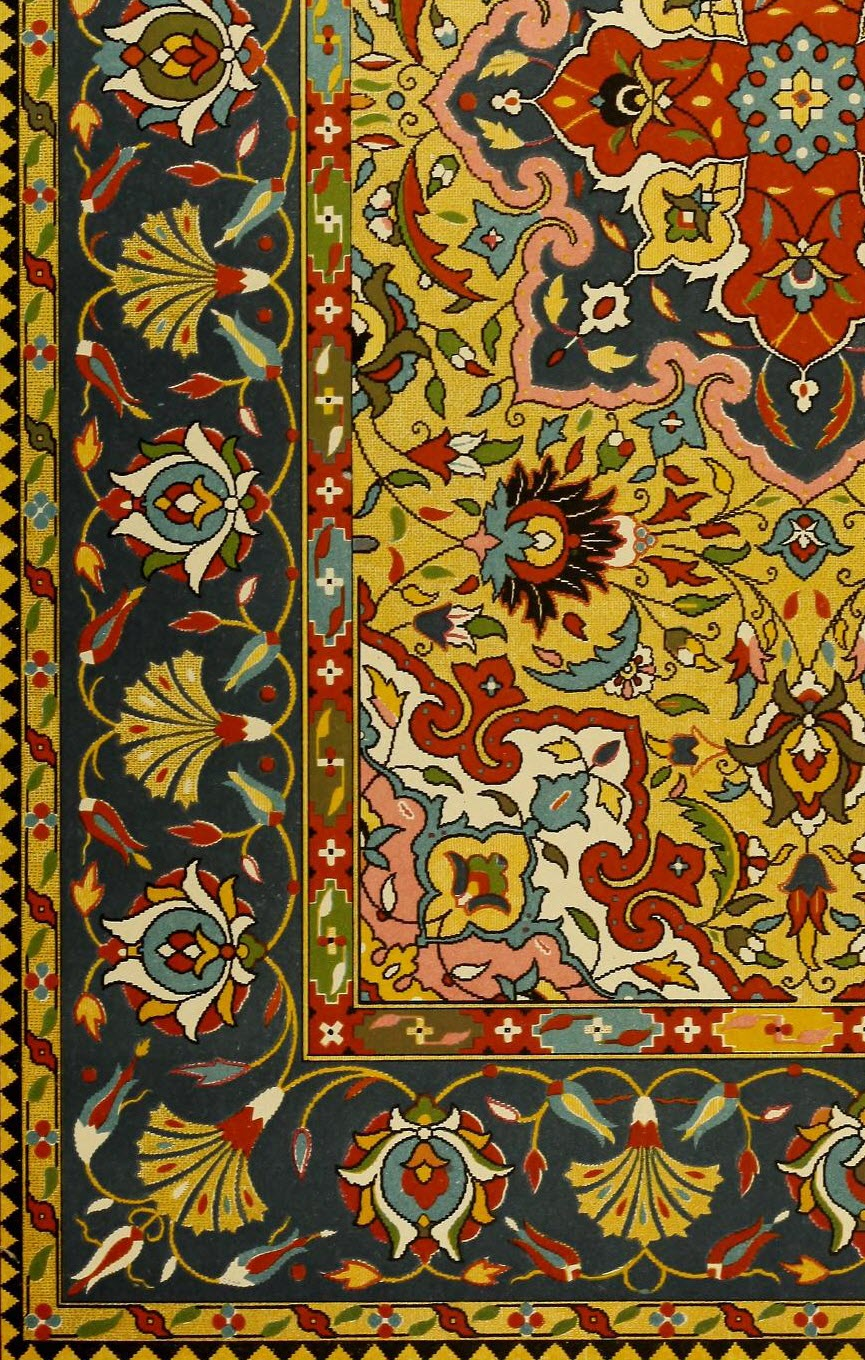
[Detail] Der Ornamentenschatz; ein Musterbuch stilvoller Ornamente aus allen Kunstepochen (1887).

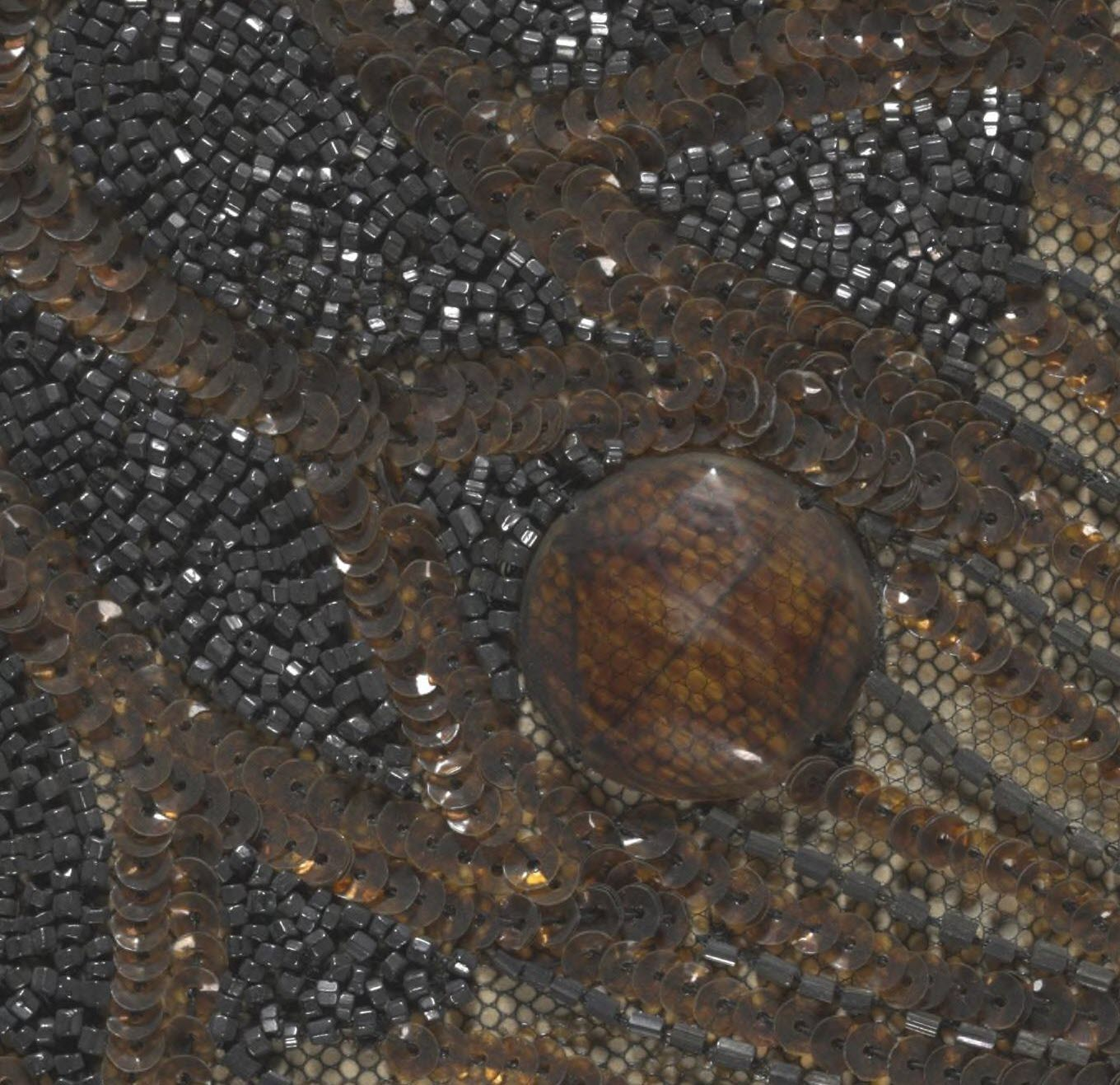
[Detail] Lobre Frères, Lyon. [Sample book of trims] (1800). https://archive.org/stream/MAB.31962000742936Images/MAB.31962000742936_Images#page/n55/mode/2up

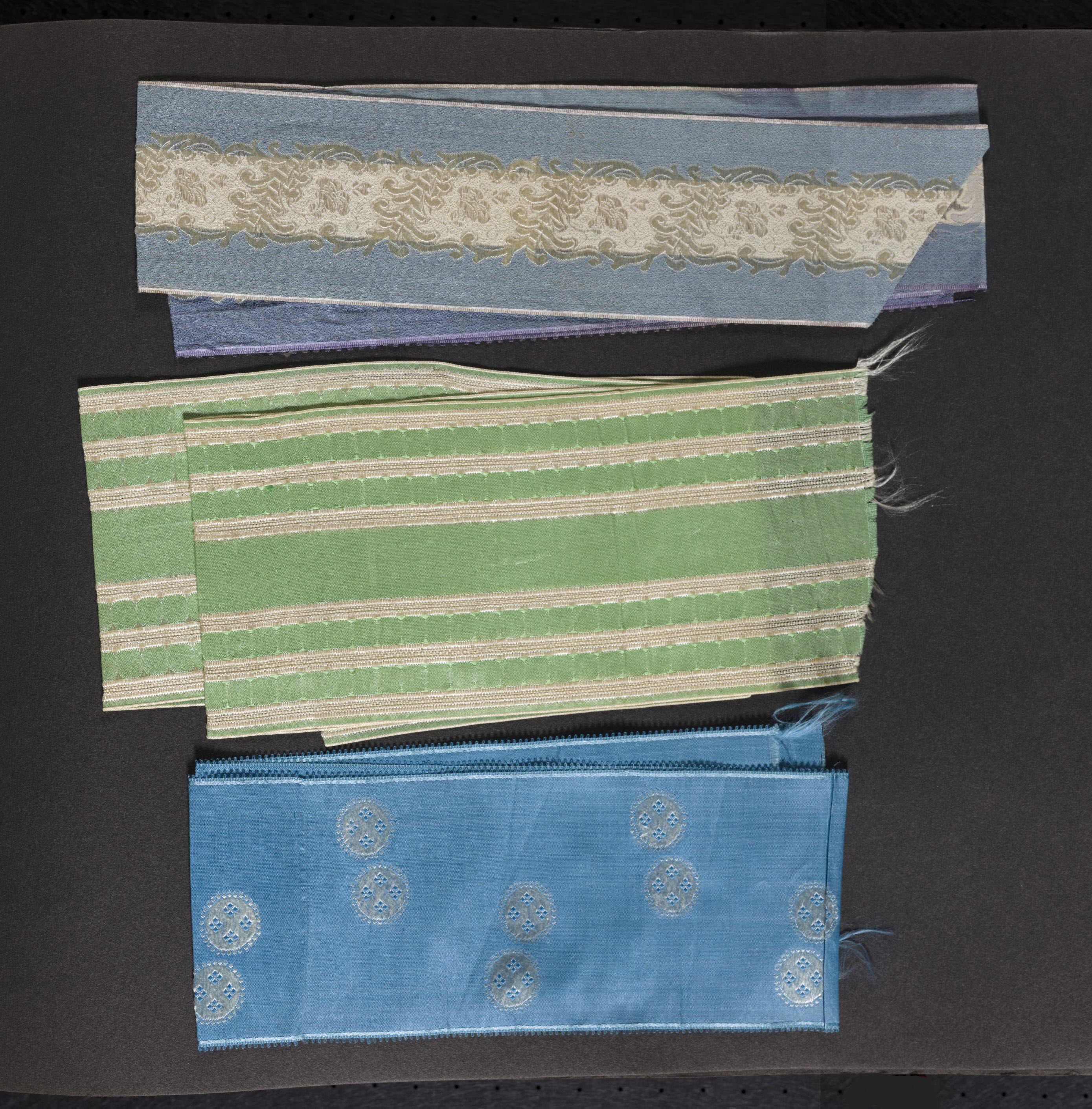
[Detail] Lace collection, 19th century. https://archive.org/stream/MAB.31962000792055Images/MAB.31962000792055_Images#page/n15/mode/2up

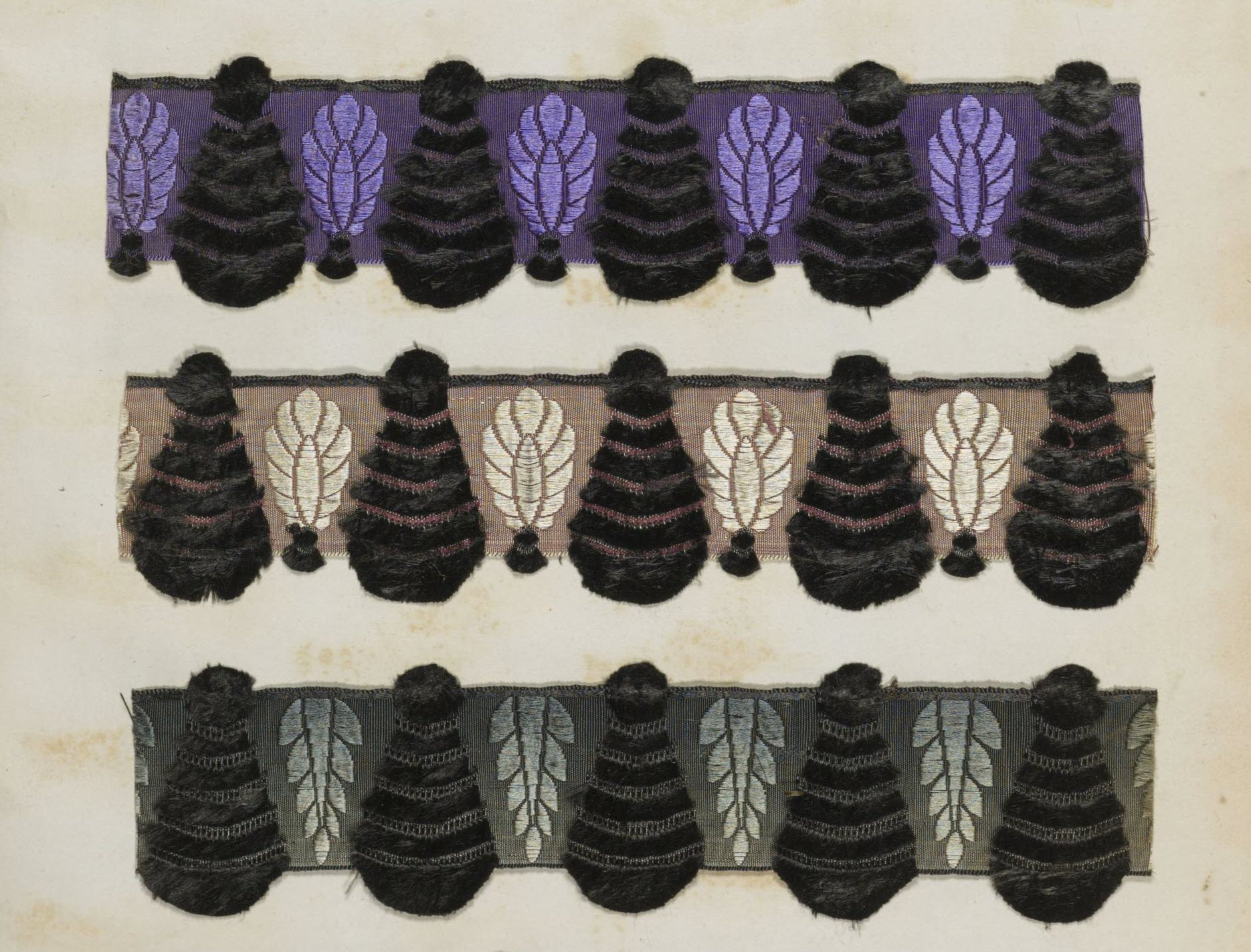
[Detail] Passementeries (1842). https://archive.org/stream/MAB.31962000742977Images/MAB.31962000742977_Images#page/n17/mode/2up

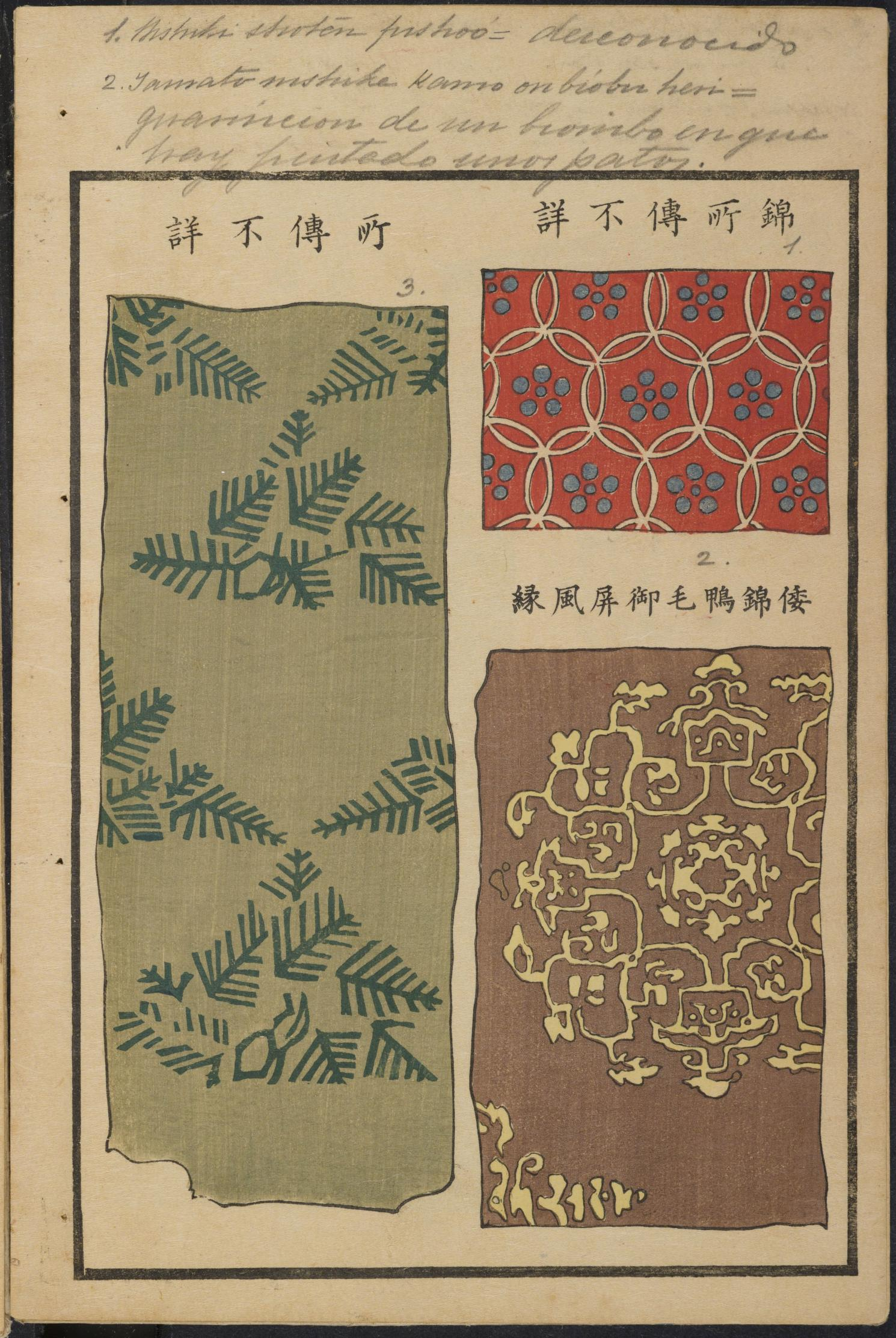
[Detail] "Shinsen Kodaimoyo Kangami.": Nueva serie de modelos de Antiguas telas / por Kodama (1882). https://archive.org/stream/MAB.31962000745293Images/MAB.31962000745293__Images#page/n13/mode/2up

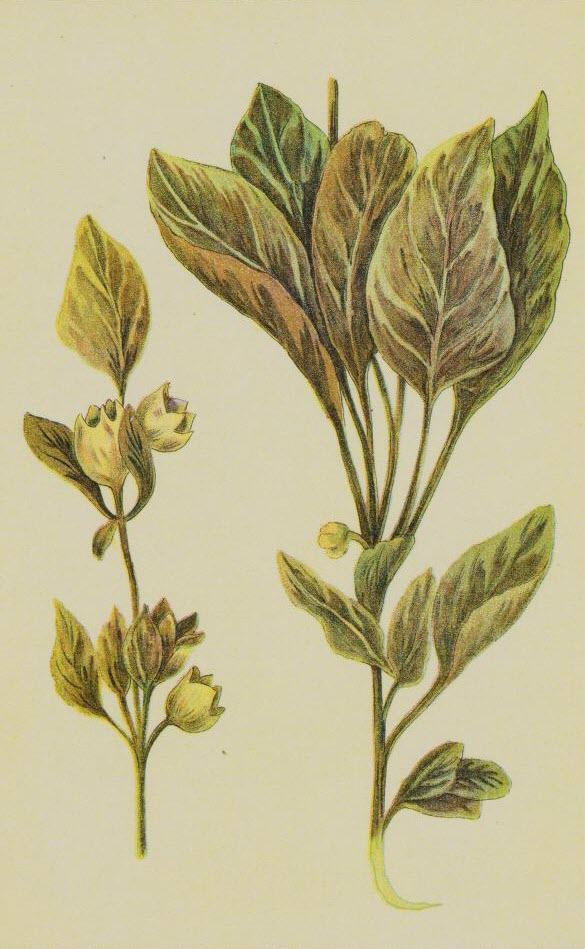
GROUND CHERRY. Wild flowers of America: flowers of every state in the American Union / by a corps of special artists and botanists (1894). https://archive.org/stream/MAB.31962004370056Images/MAB.31962004370056_Images#page/n13/mode/2up

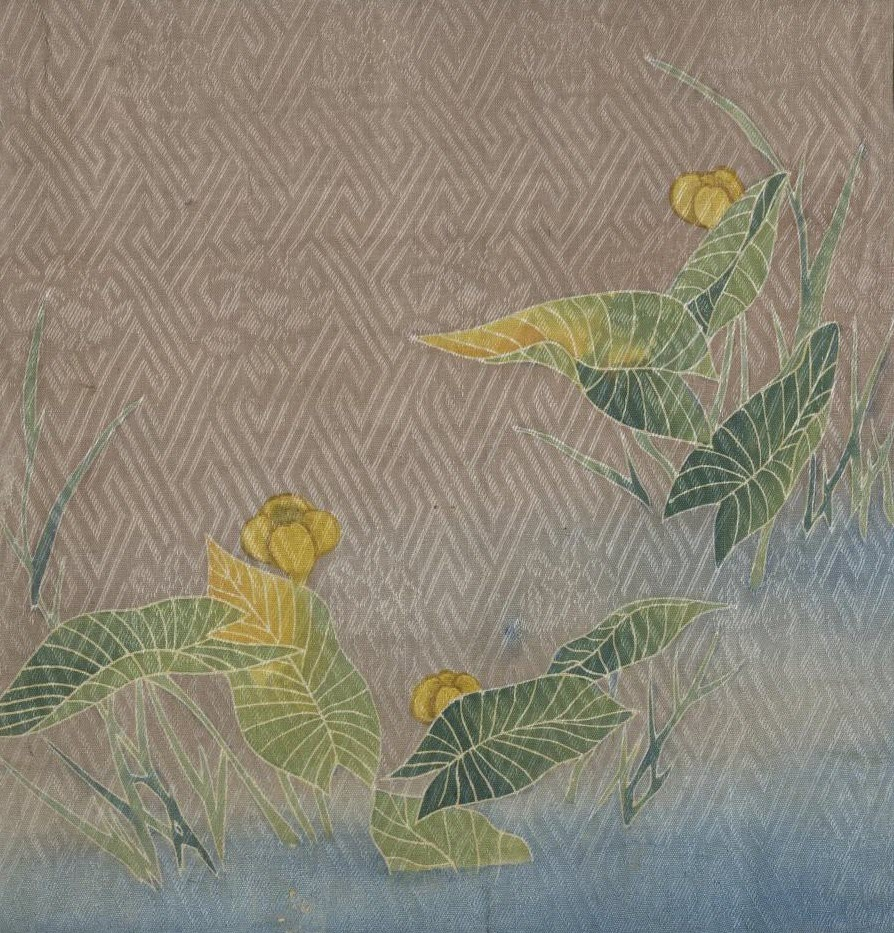
[Detail] Japanese decorated silk (1700). https://archive.org/stream/MAB.31962000745236Images_20130422/MAB.31962000745236__images#page/n19/mode/2up

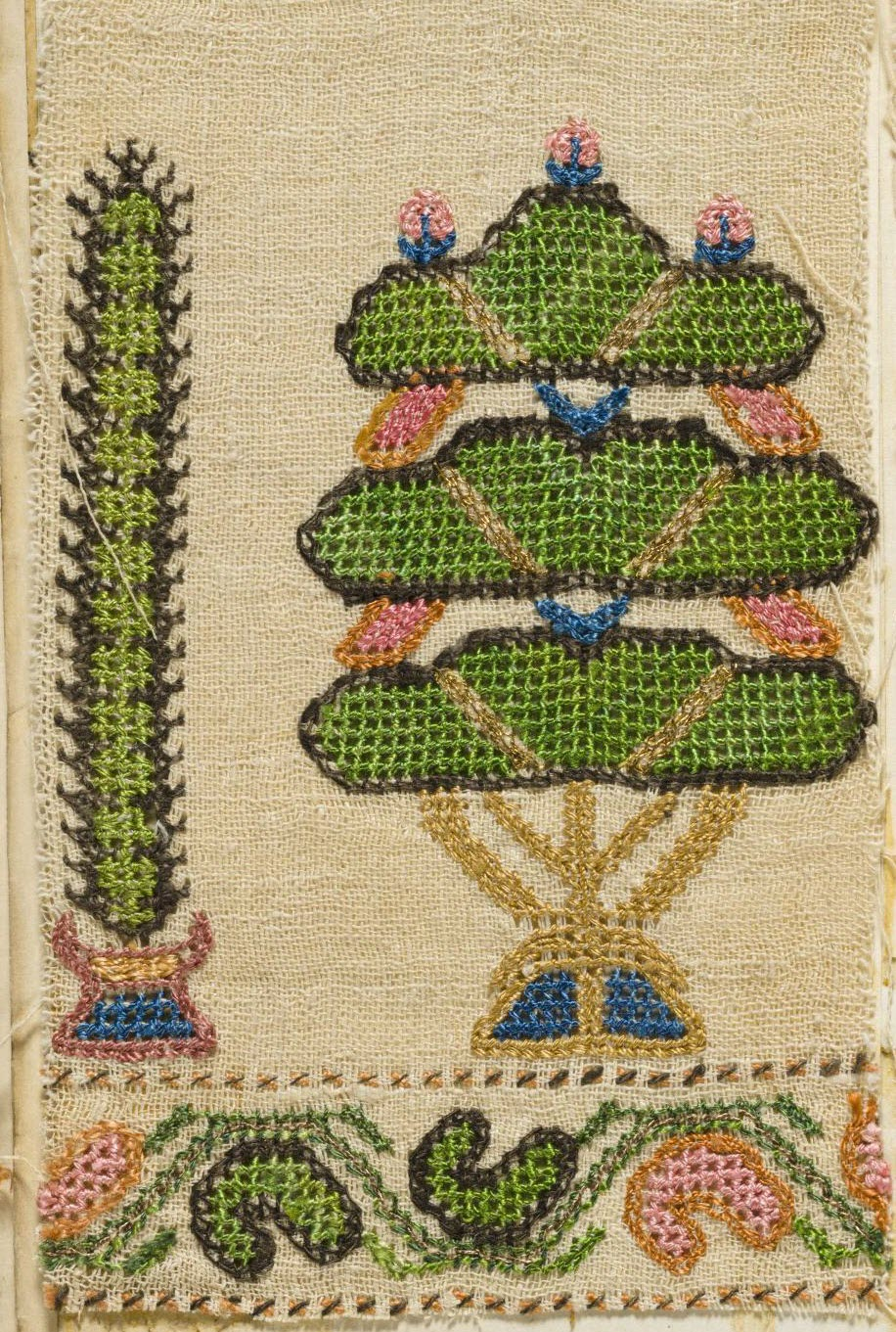
[Detail] Patterns and designs. https://archive.org/stream/MAB.31962000795432Images_201305/MAB.31962000795432_Images#page/n13/mode/2up

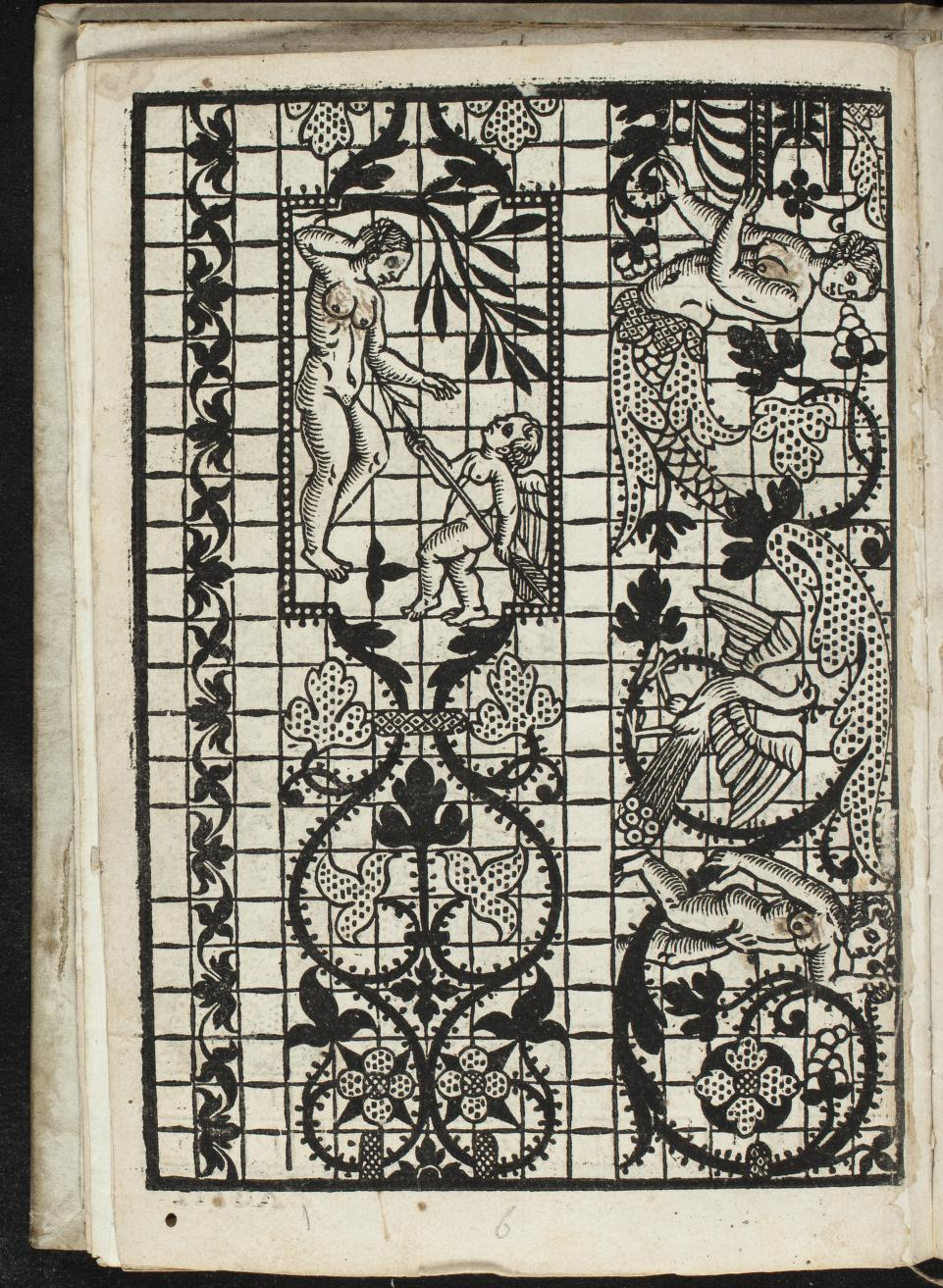
L'honesto essempio del uertuoso desiderio che hanno le donne di nobil ingegno: circa lo imparare i punti tagliati a fogliami (1550). https://archive.org/stream/MAB.31962000791461Images/MAB.31962000791461_Images#page/n11/mode/2up

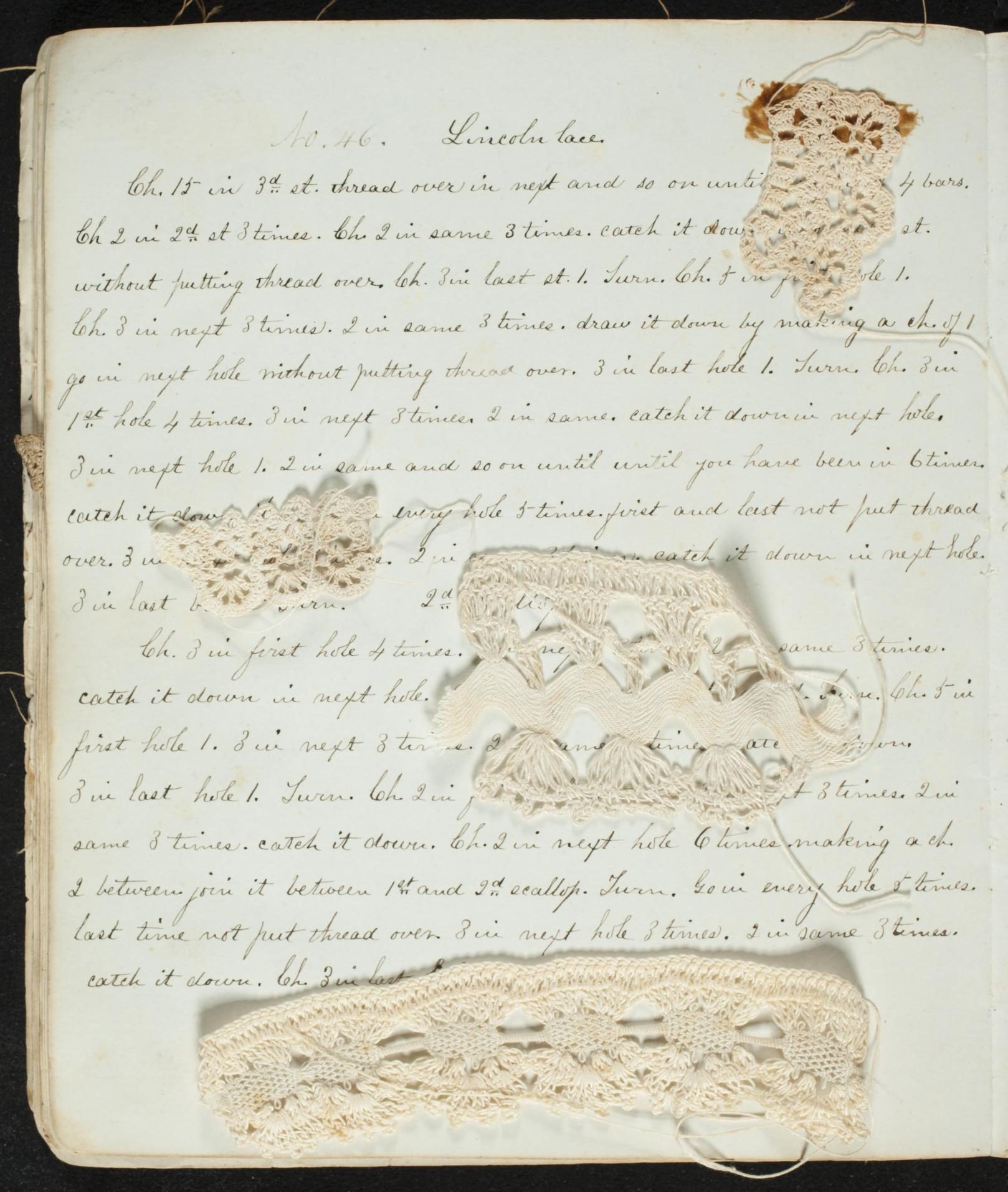
Lincoln Lace. Lace instructions,1859 Jan. 22 (1859). https://archive.org/stream/MAB.31962000793137Images/MAB.31962000793137_Images#page/n55/mode/2up

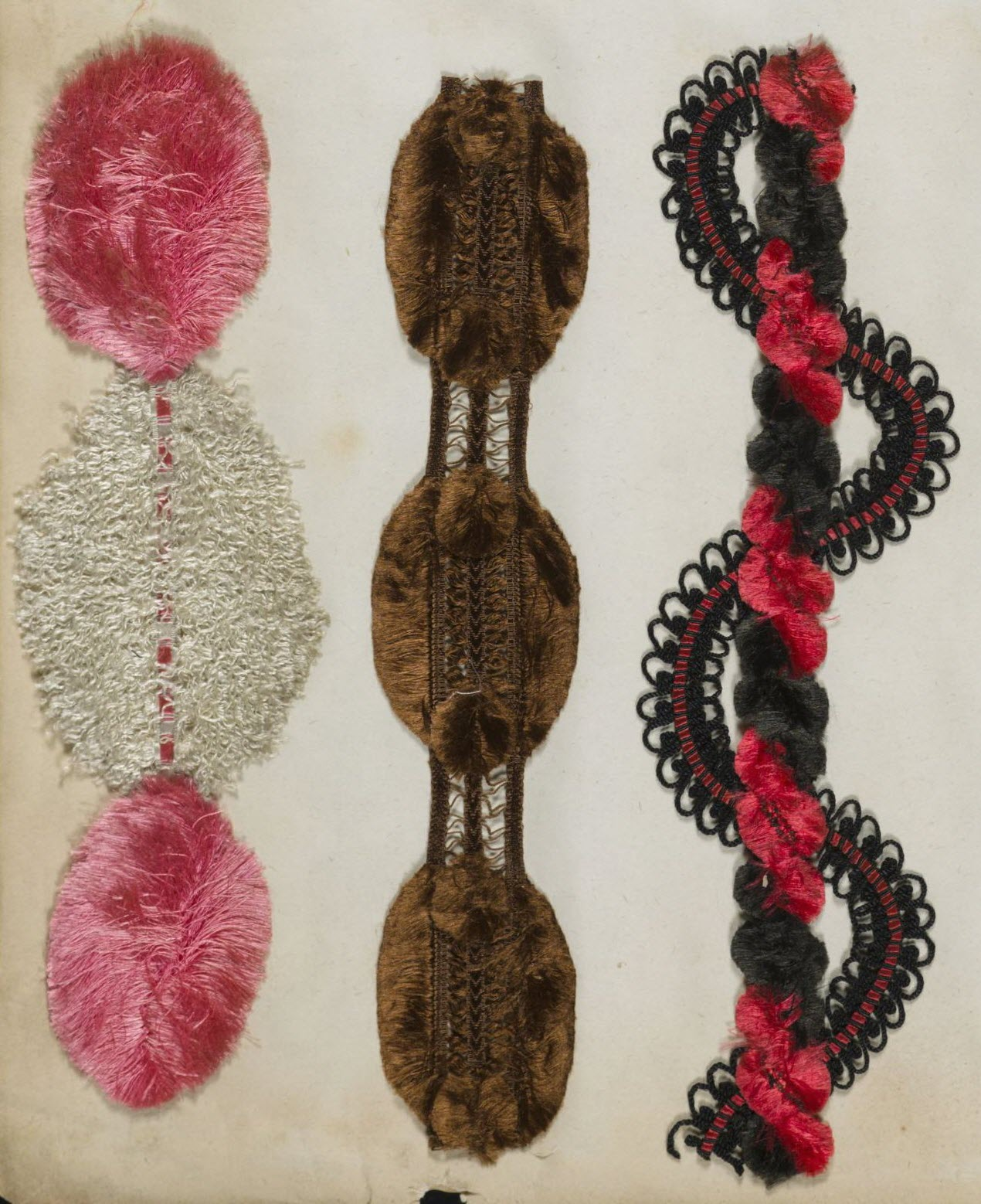
[Detail] Passementeries (1842). https://archive.org/stream/MAB.31962000742977Images/MAB.31962000742977_Images#page/n61/mode/2up

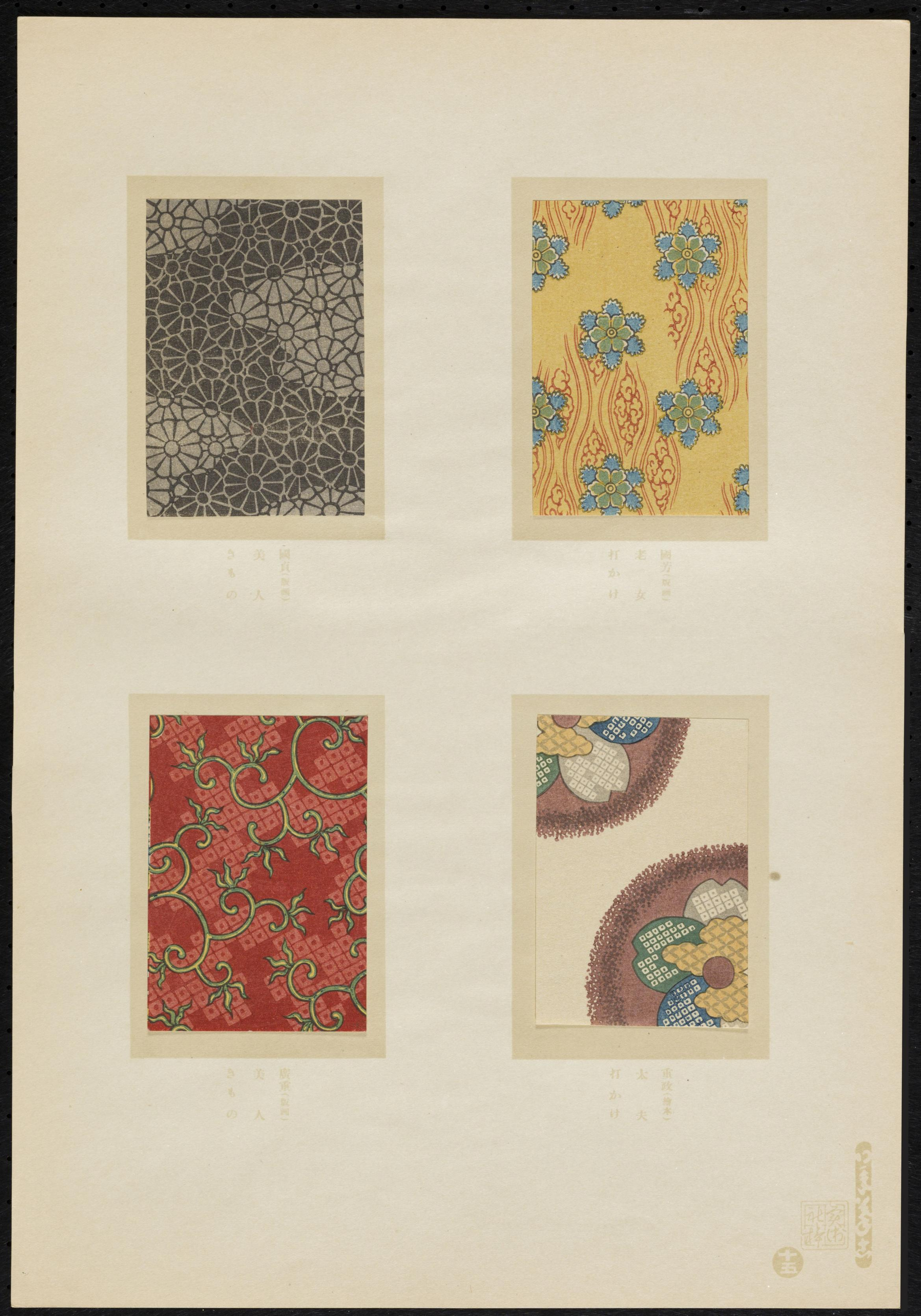
Japanese designs from Ukiyoe prints (1800). https://archive.org/stream/MAB.31962000726566Images_20130507/MAB.31962000726566_Images#page/n7/mode/2up

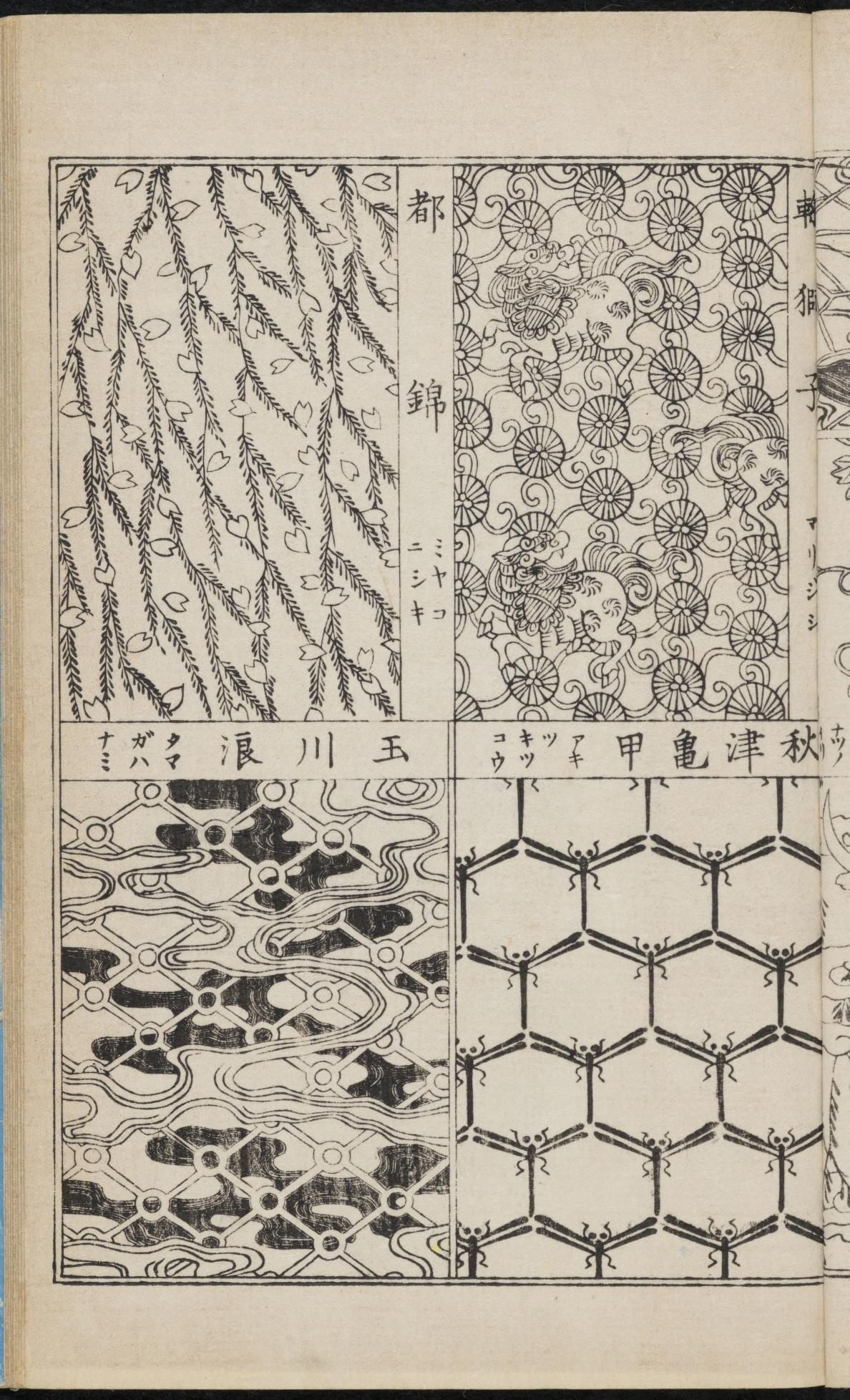
Japanese designs. https://archive.org/stream/MAB.31962000726541Images/MAB.31962000726541__Images#page/n39/mode/2up

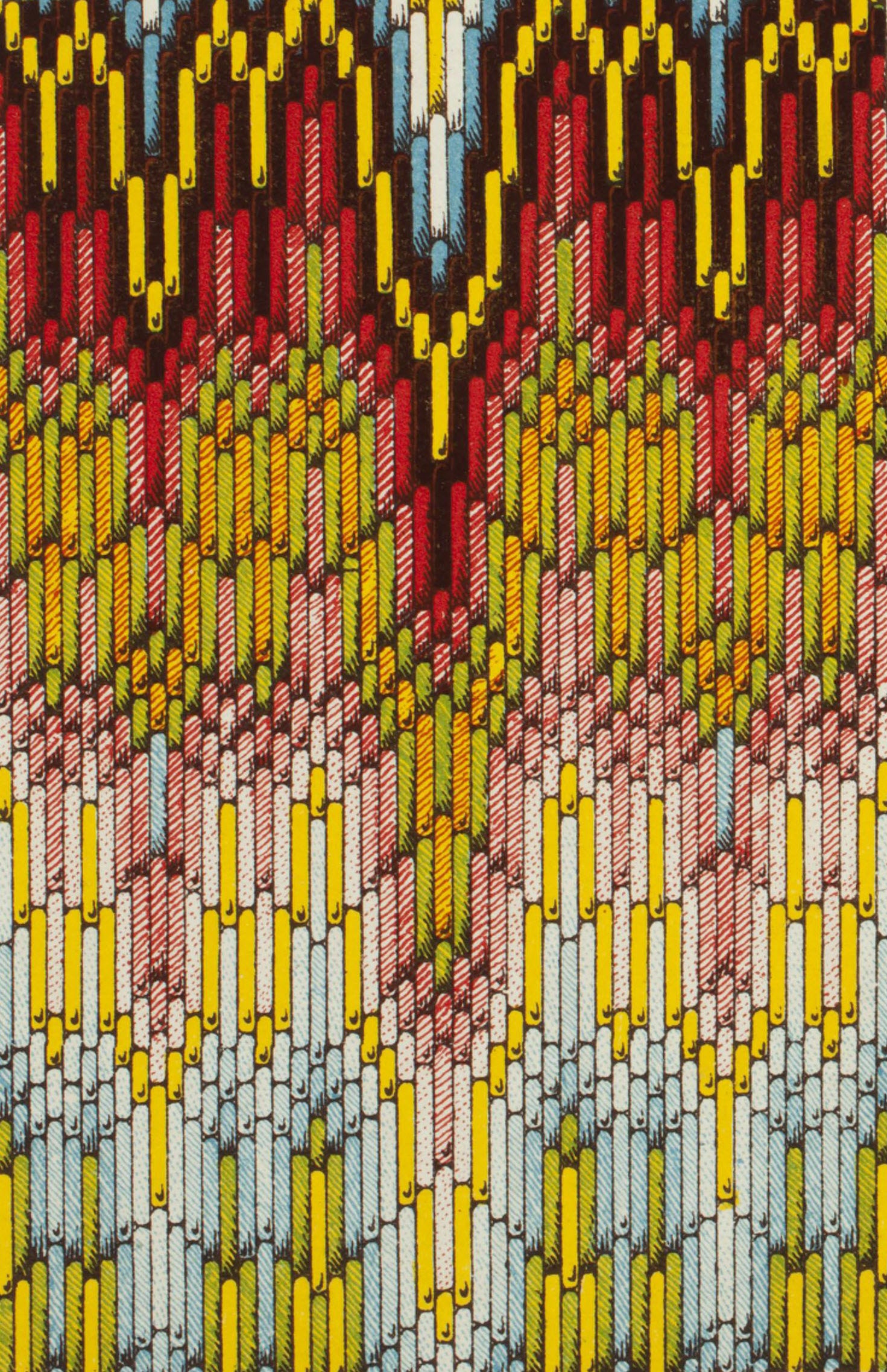
Album de tapisserie / [par] N. Alexandre & Cie., éditeurs, dessinateurs. Nos. 57, 240, 243, and 250. https://archive.org/stream/MAB.31962004370221Images/MAB.31962004370221_Images#page/n3/mode/2up

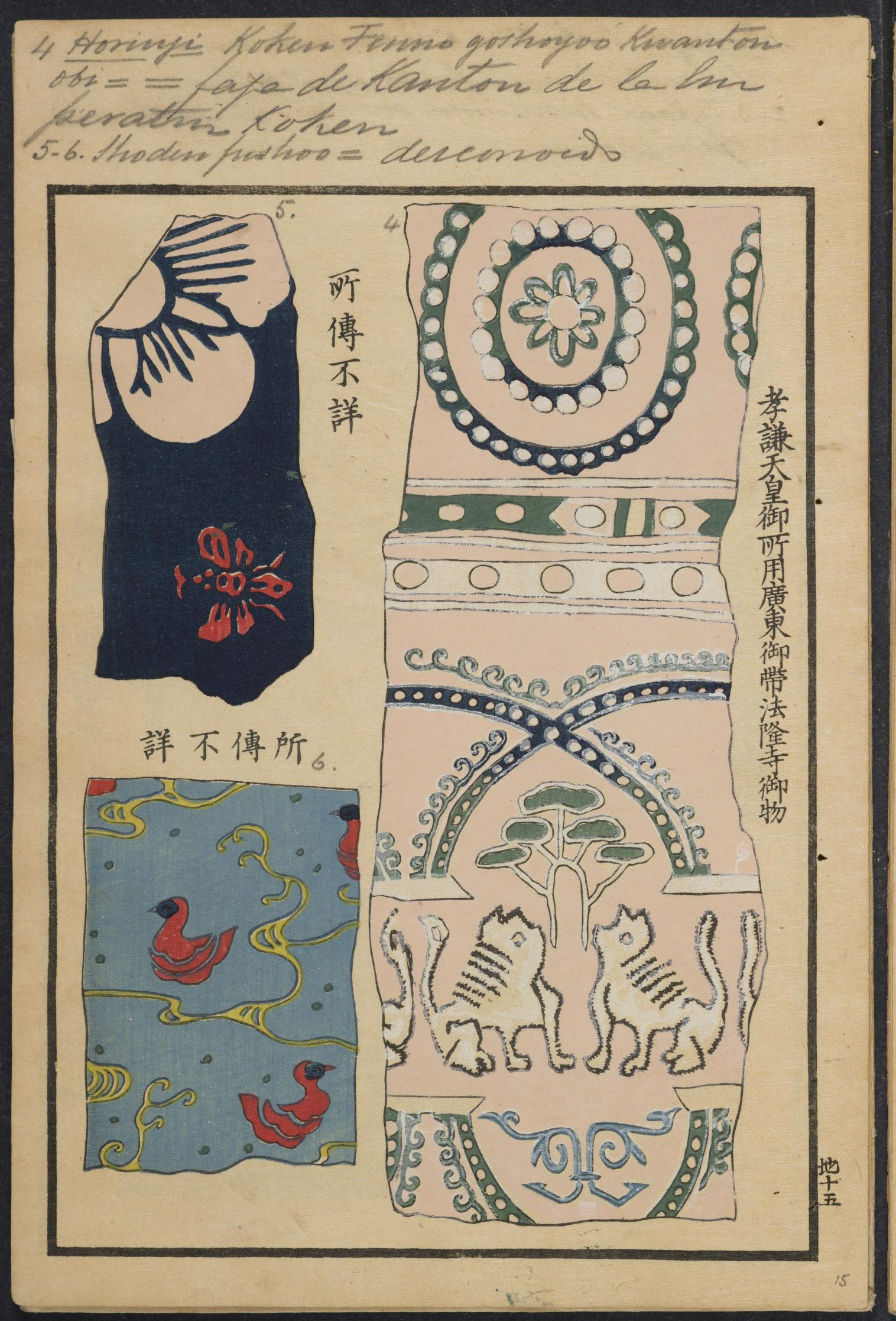
"Shinsen Kodaimoyo Kangami.": Nueva serie de modelos de Antiguas telas / por Kodama (1882). https://archive.org/stream/MAB.31962000745293Images/MAB.31962000745293__Images#page/n29/mode/2up

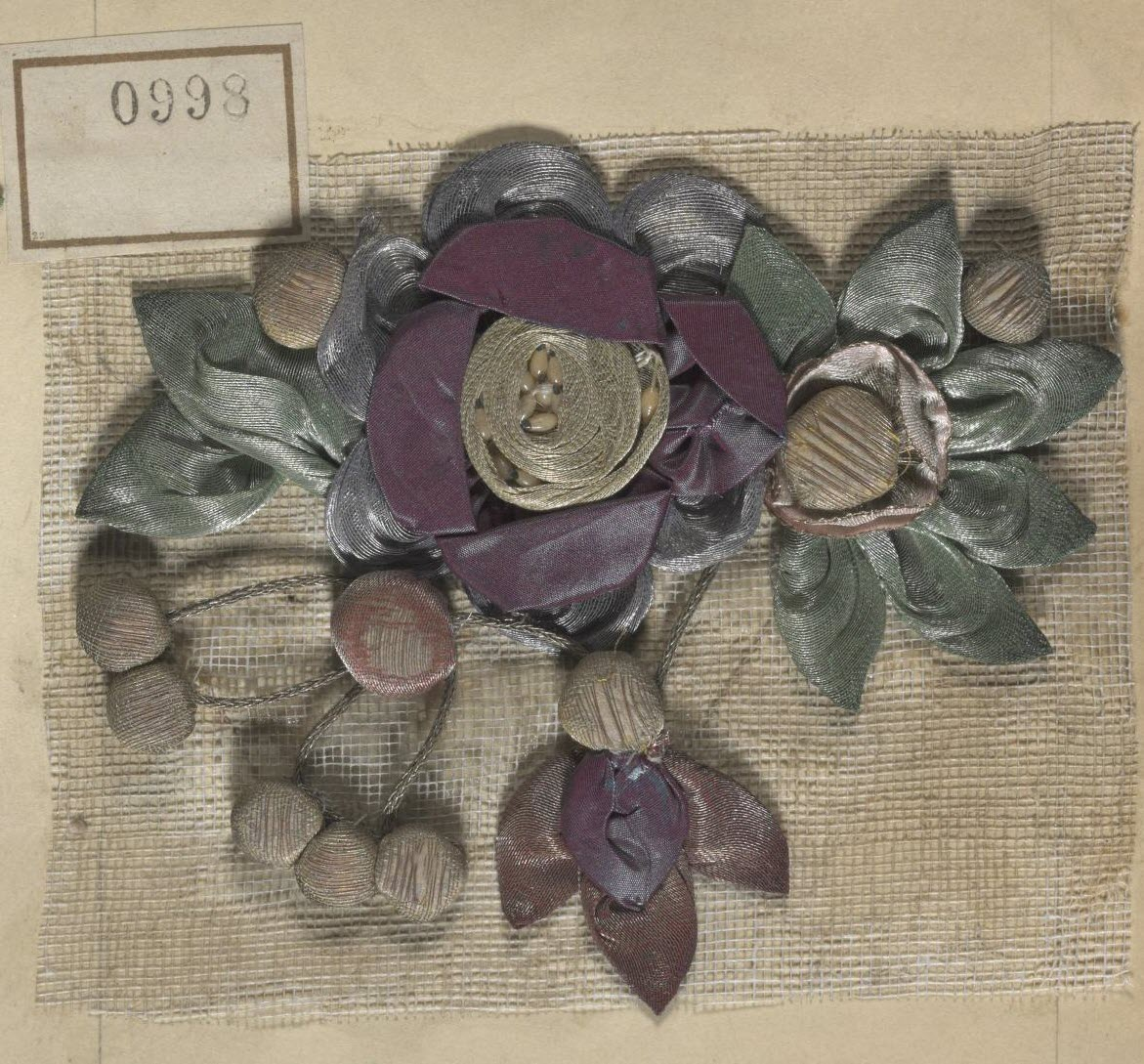
[Detail] Lobre Frères, Lyon. [Sample book of trims] (1800). https://archive.org/stream/MAB.31962000742936Images/MAB.31962000742936_Images#page/n33/mode/2up

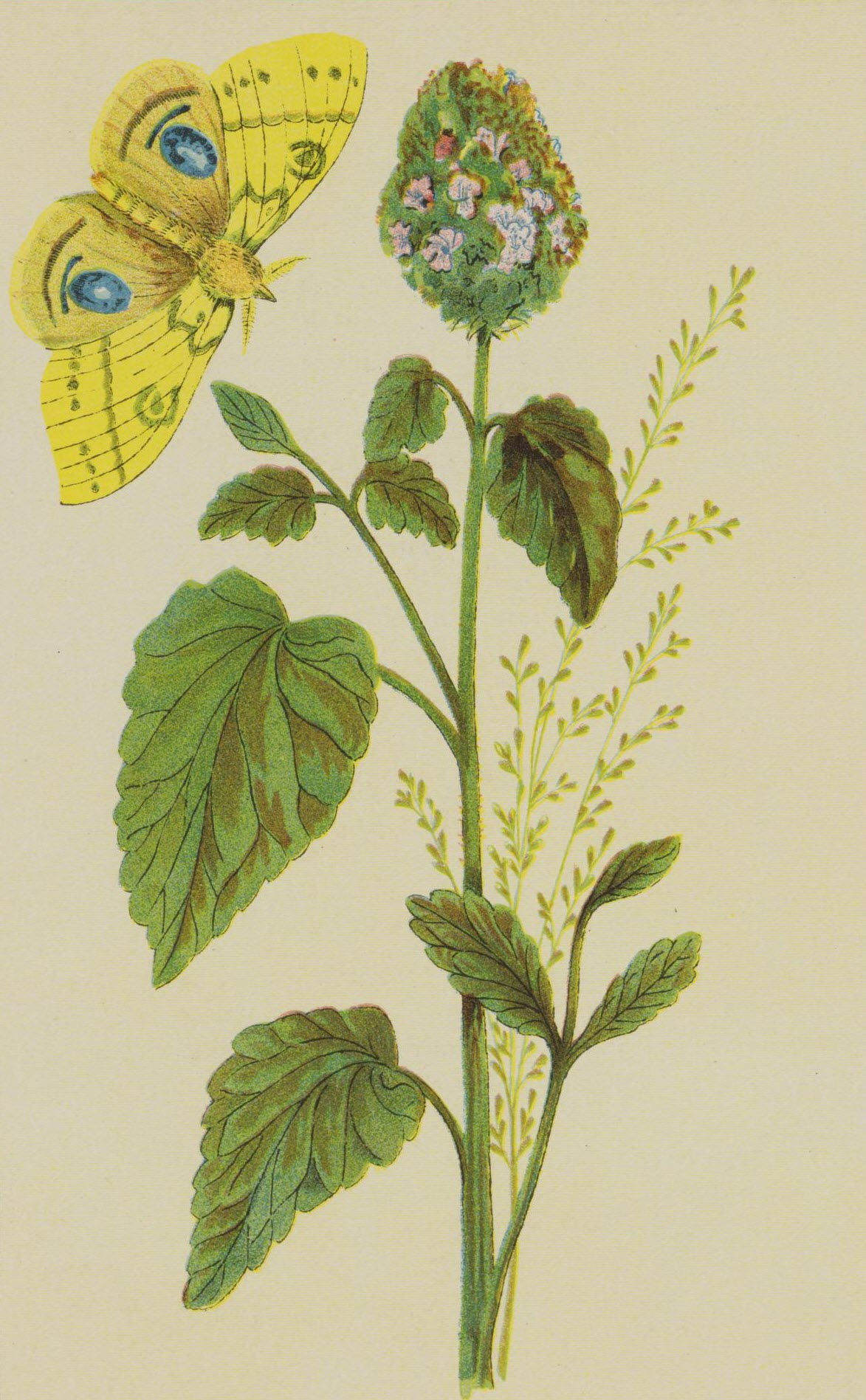
Cat-Mint. Wild flowers of America: flowers of every state in the American Union / by a corps of special artists and botanists (1894). https://archive.org/stream/MAB.31962004370049Images/MAB.31962004370049_Images#page/n11/mode/2up

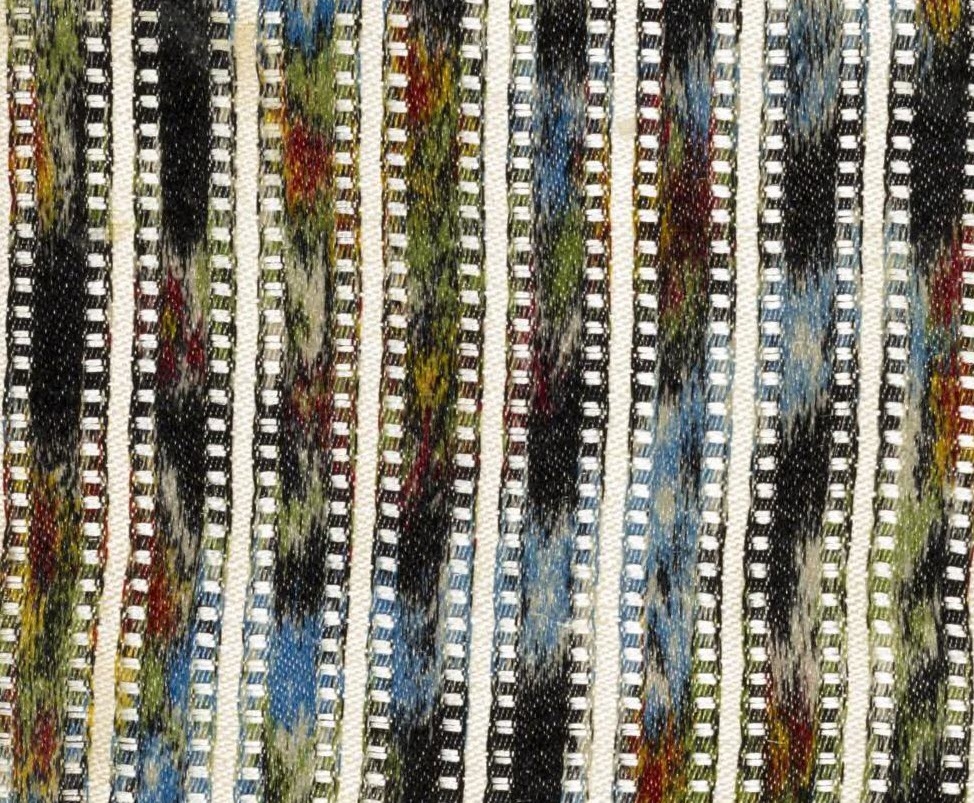
[Detail] Collection Empire (1900). https://archive.org/stream/MAB.31962000743264Images_201304/MAB.31962000743264#page/n201/mode/2up

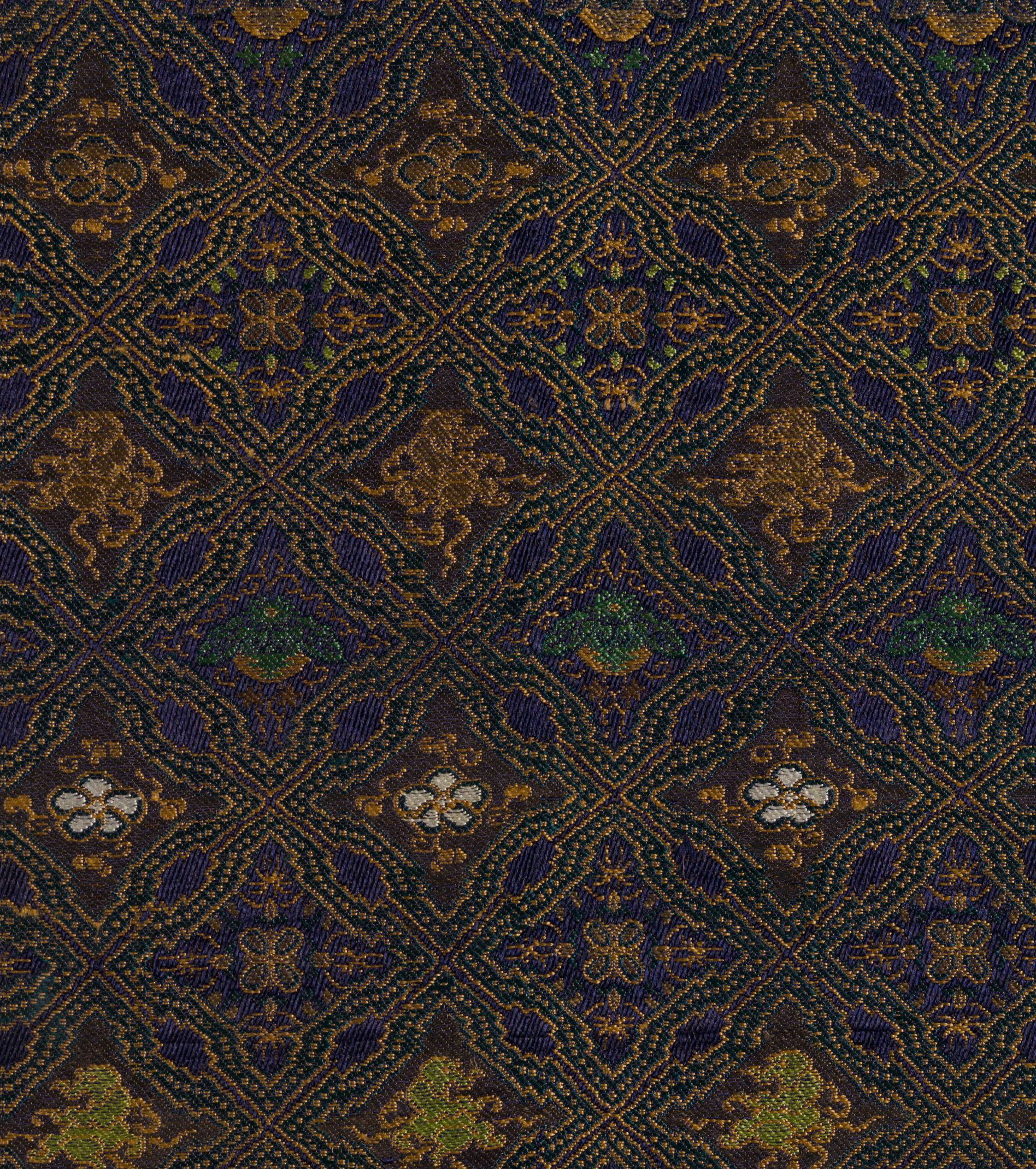
[Detail] Oriental cloth samples. https://archive.org/stream/NK8872O71/NK8872%20O71#page/n17/mode/2up

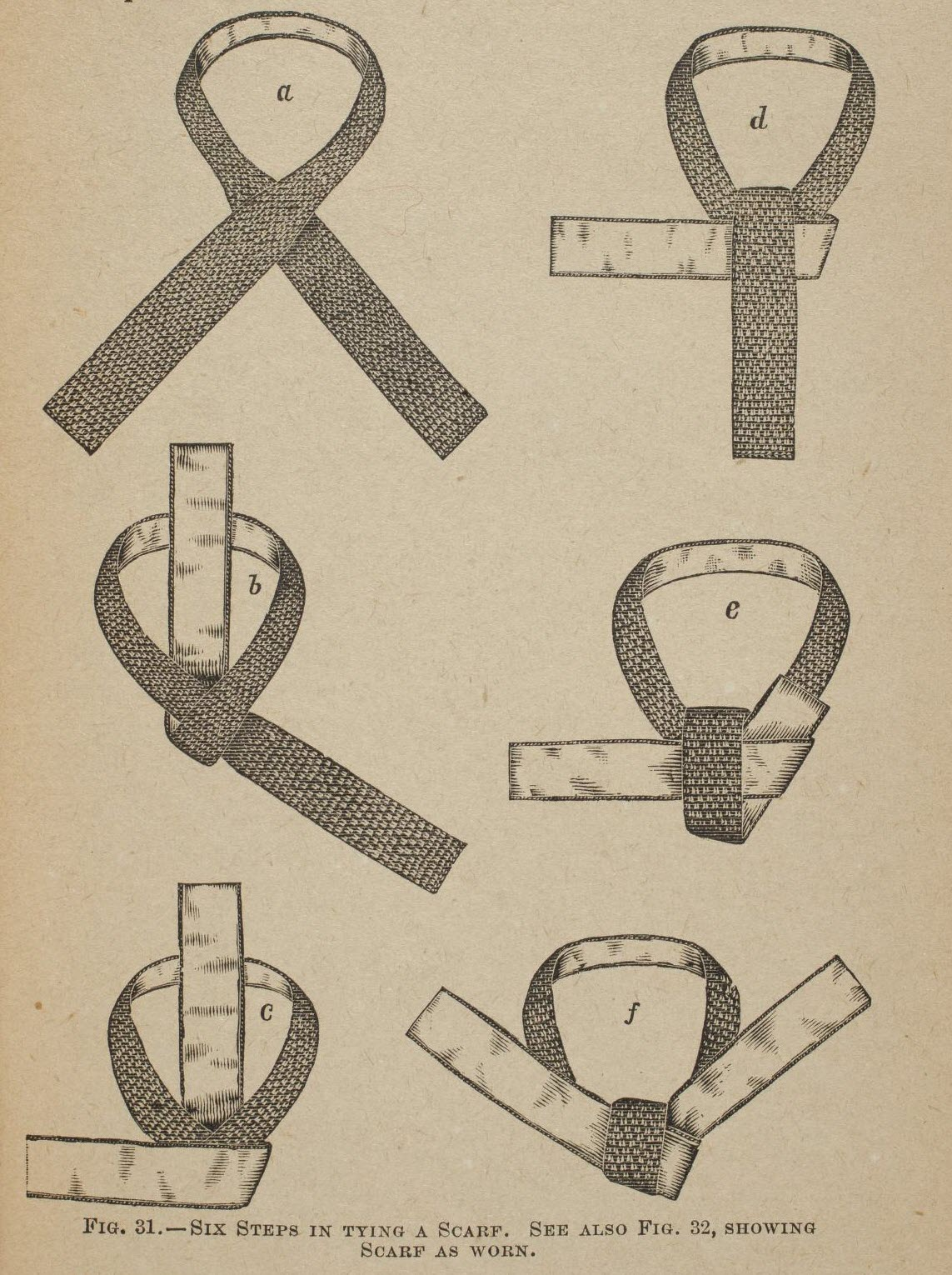
Six steps in tying a scarf. Florence home needle-work (1892). https://archive.org/stream/MAB.31962000794853Images/MAB.31962000794853_Images#page/n33/mode/2up

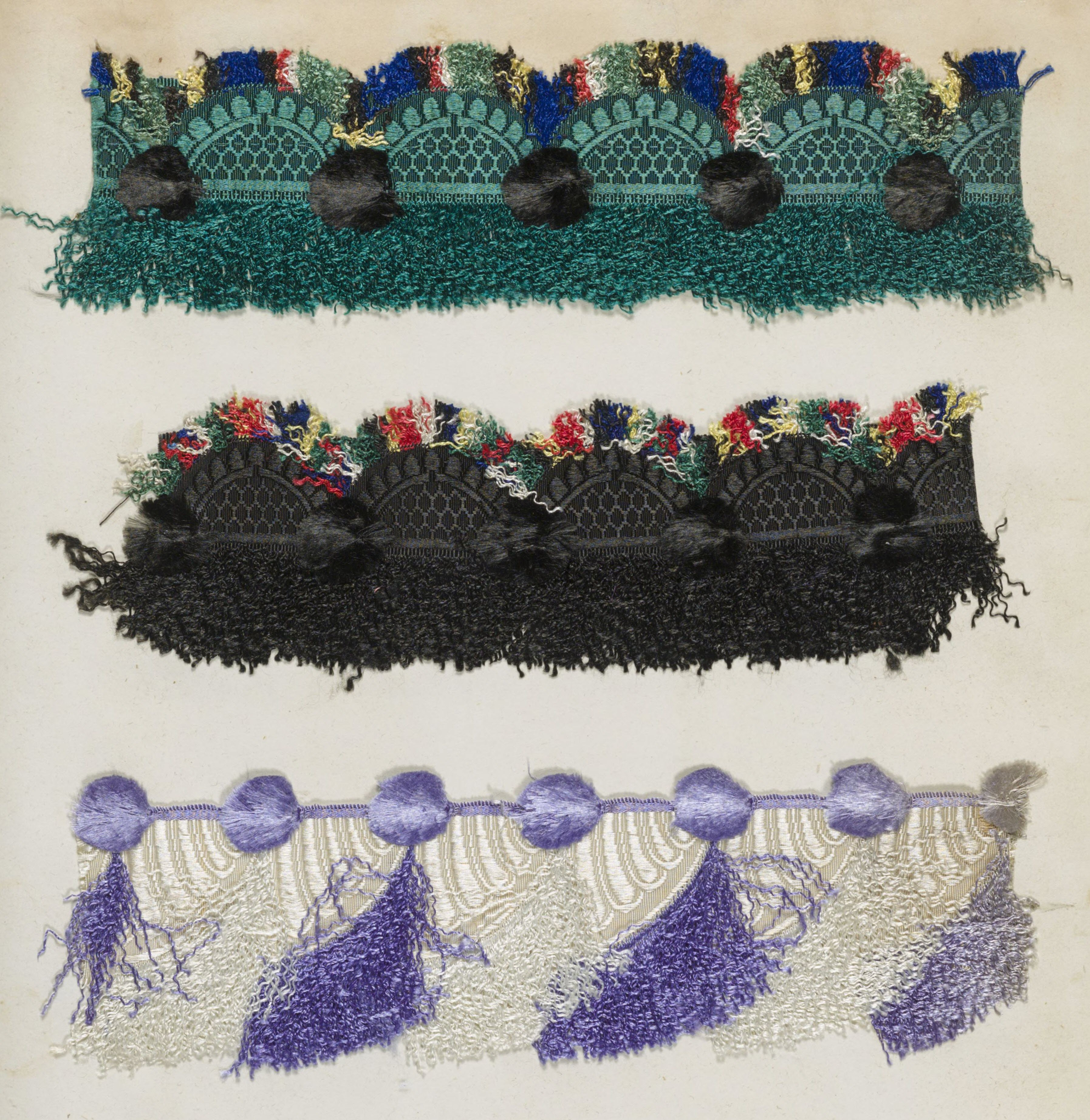
[Detail] Passementeries (1842). https://archive.org/stream/MAB.31962000742977Images/MAB.31962000742977_Images#page/n35/mode/2up

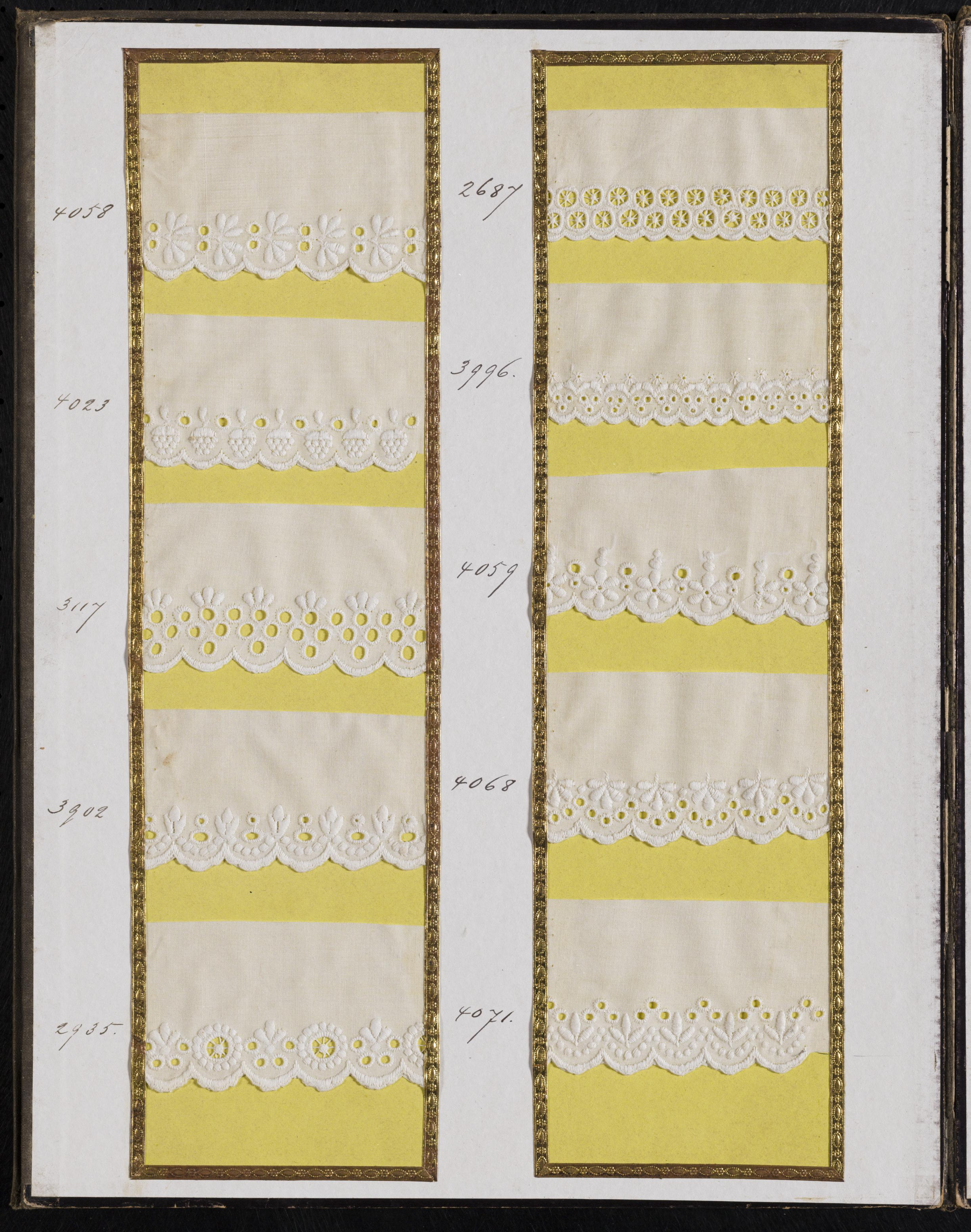
Embroidered edgings: job lot offer, ref. 812 (1860). https://archive.org/stream/MAB.31962000791701Images/MAB.31962000791701#page/n3/mode/2up

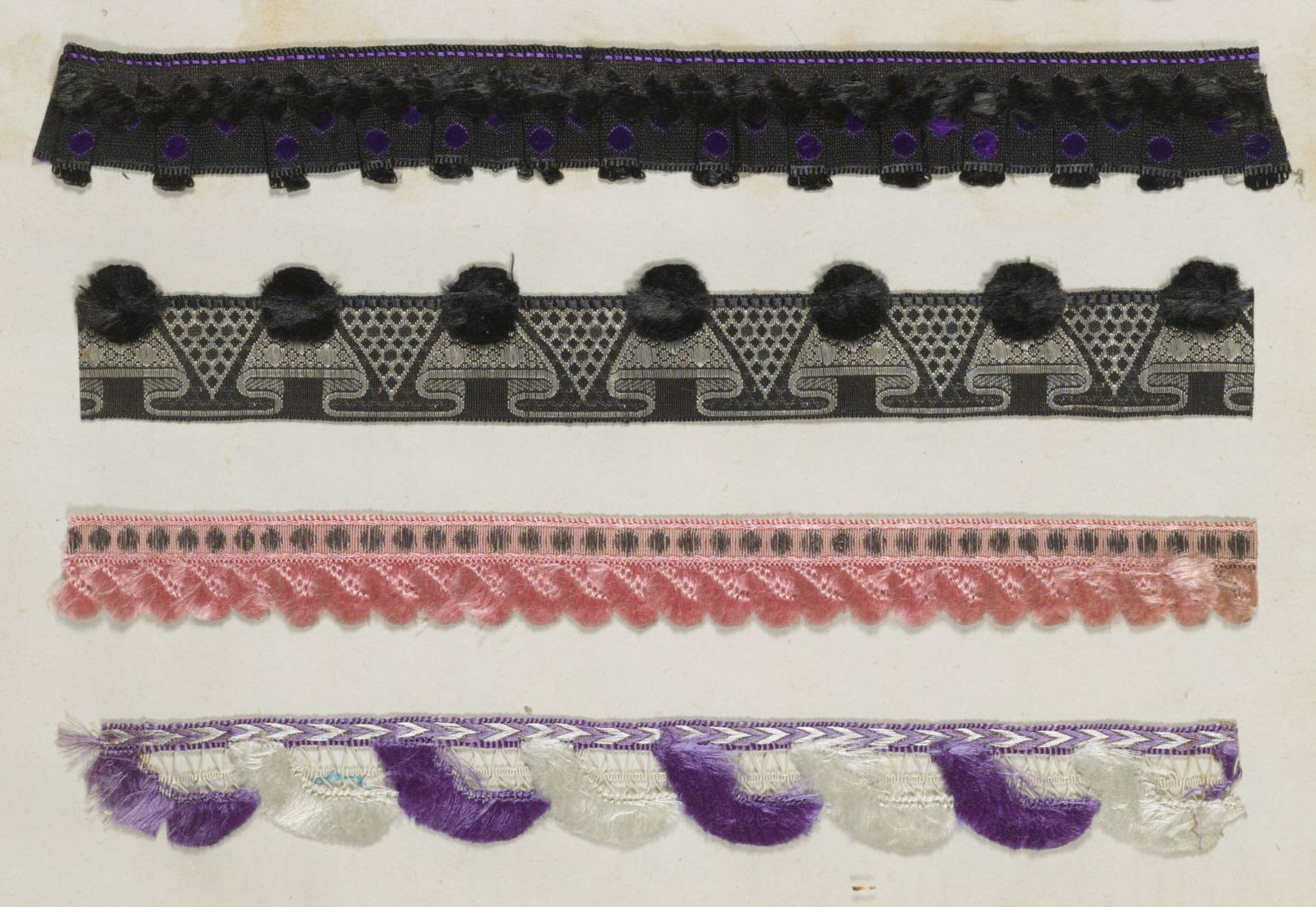
Detail. Passementeries (1842). https://archive.org/stream/MAB.31962000742977Images/MAB.31962000742977_Images#page/n7/mode/2up

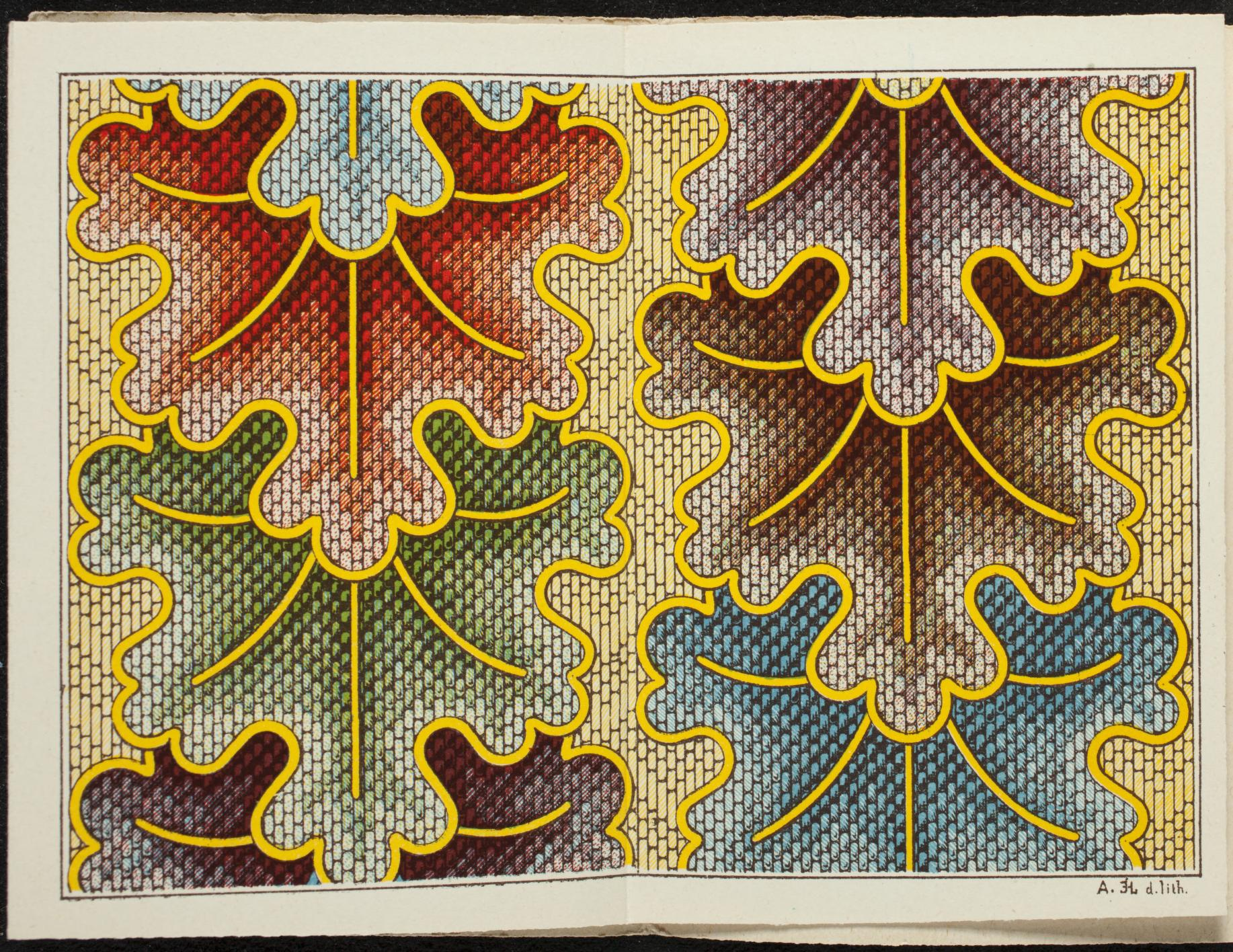
Album de tapisserie / [par] N. Alexandre & Cie., éditeurs, dessinateurs. Nos. 57, 240, 243, and 250 ([n.d.]). https://archive.org/stream/MAB.31962004370221Images/MAB.31962004370221_Images#page/n5/mode/2up

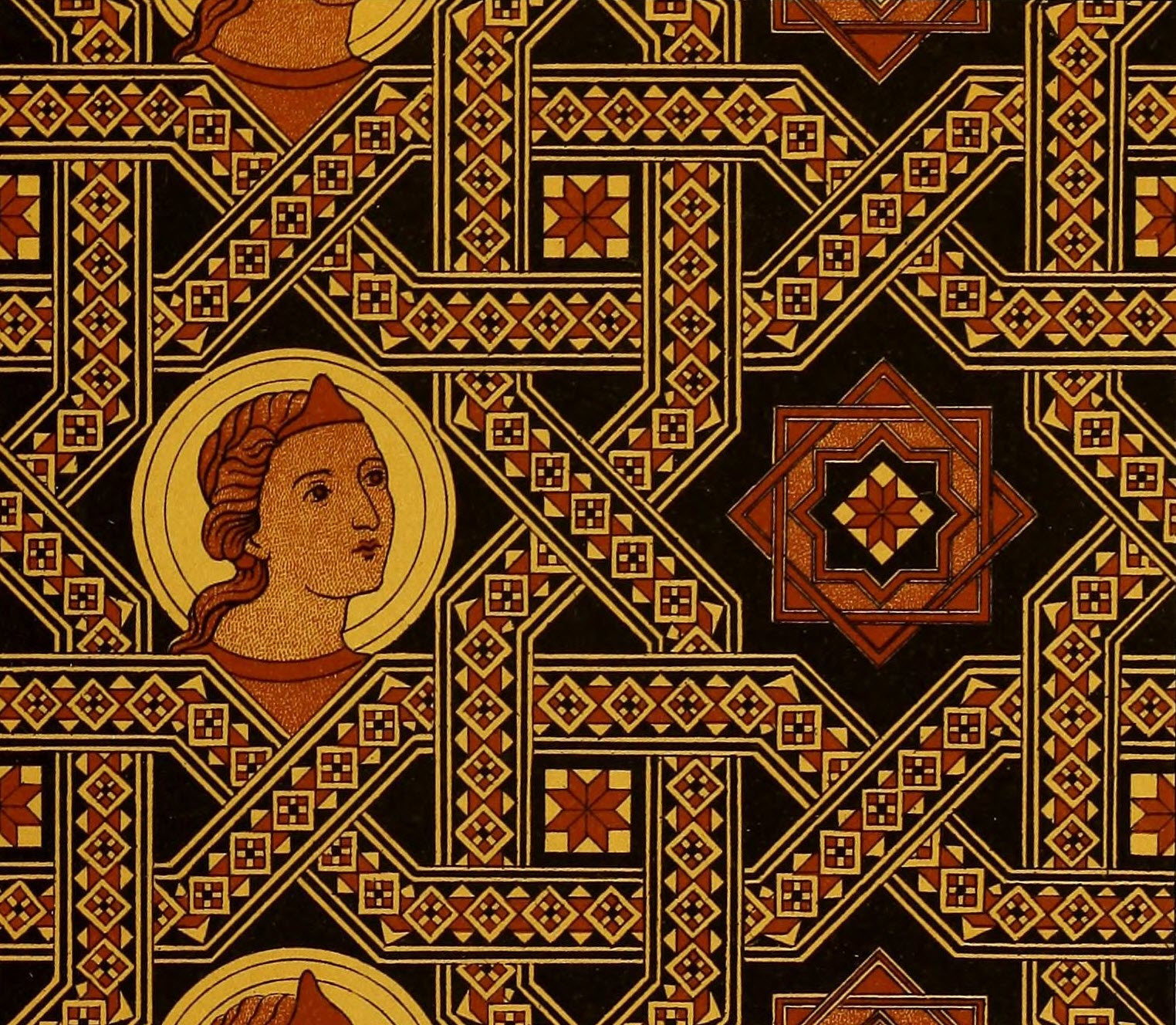
[Detail] Der Ornamentenschatz; ein Musterbuch stilvoller Ornamente aus allen Kunstepochen (1887). https://archive.org/stream/derornamentensch00dolm#page/n123/mode/2up

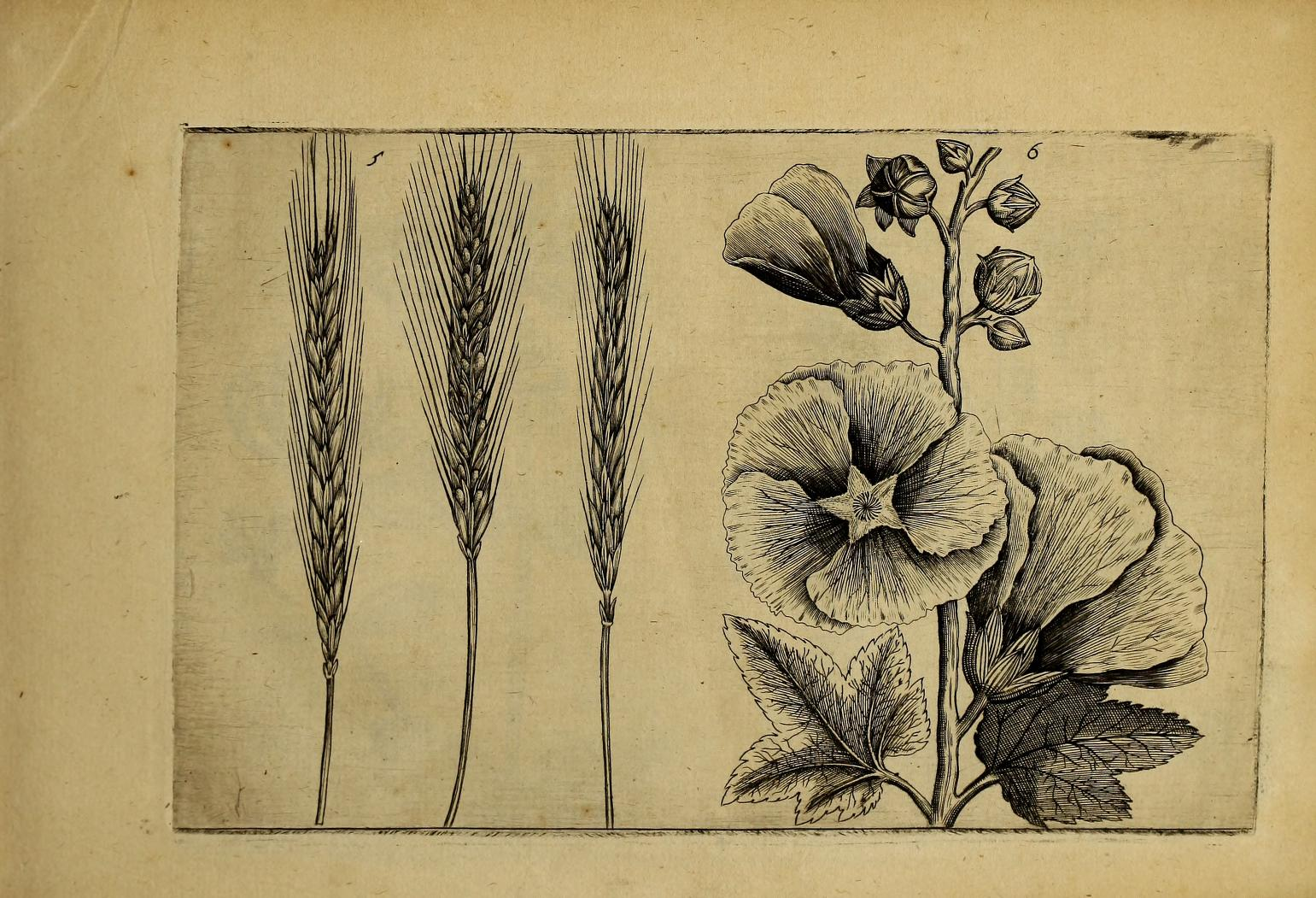
Cognoscite lilia agri quomodo crescent (1614). https://archive.org/stream/cognosciteliliaa00pass#page/n13/mode/2up

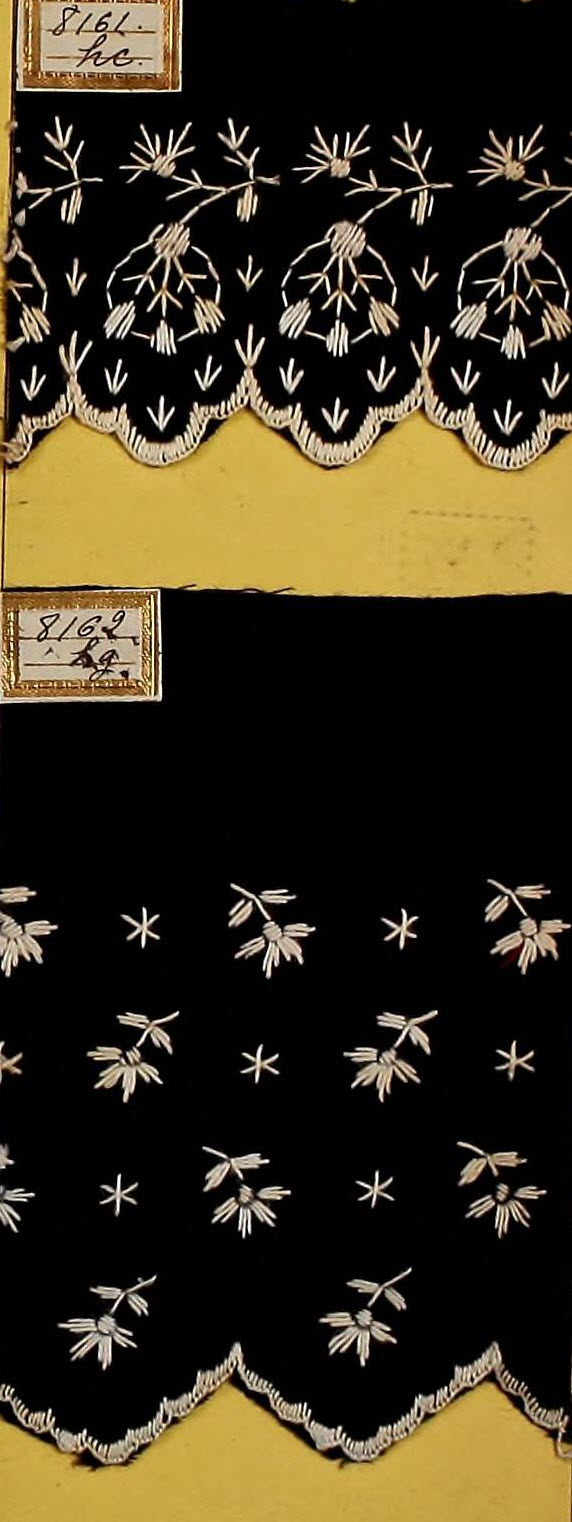
[Detail] De la fabrique d'étoffes (1842). https://archive.org/stream/delafabriquedtof00unse#page/n47/mode/2up

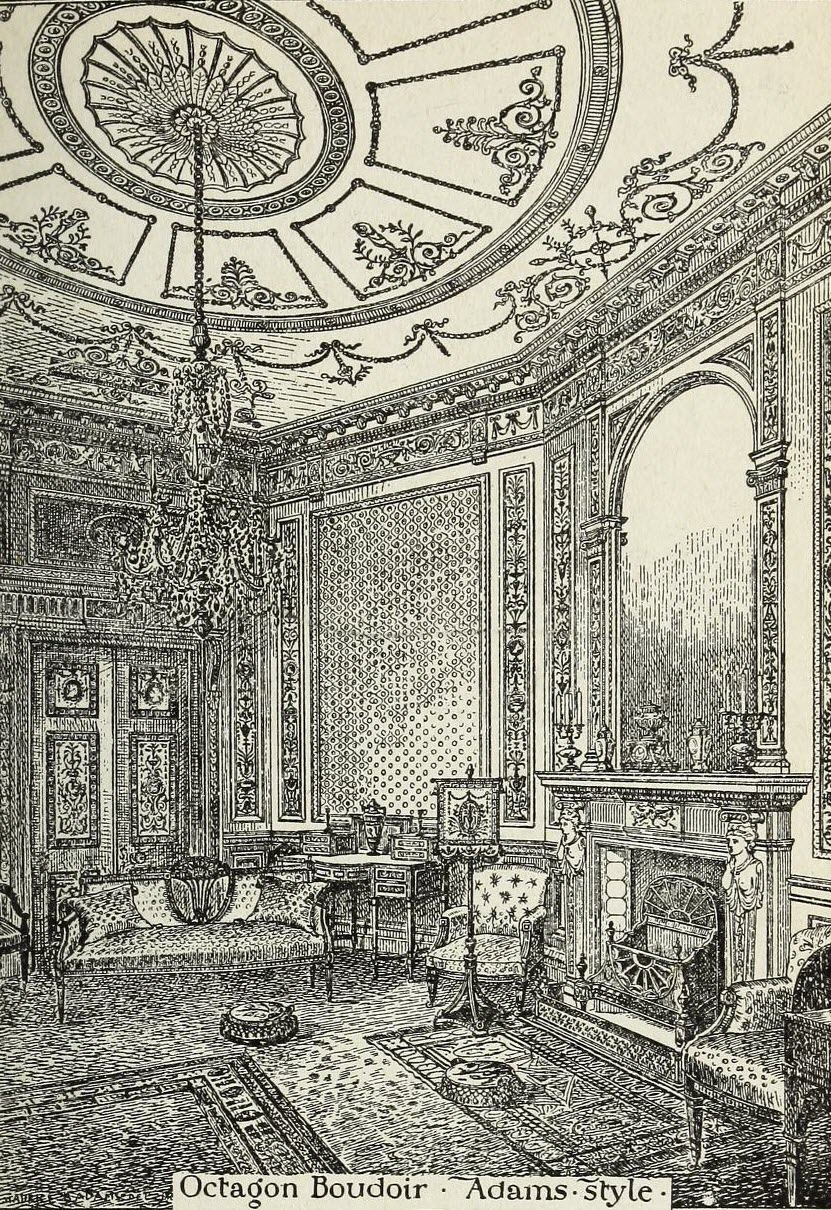
Octagon Boudoir—Adams style. The practical cabinet maker ... (1910). https://archive.org/stream/practicalcabinet1910hodg#page/182/mode/2up

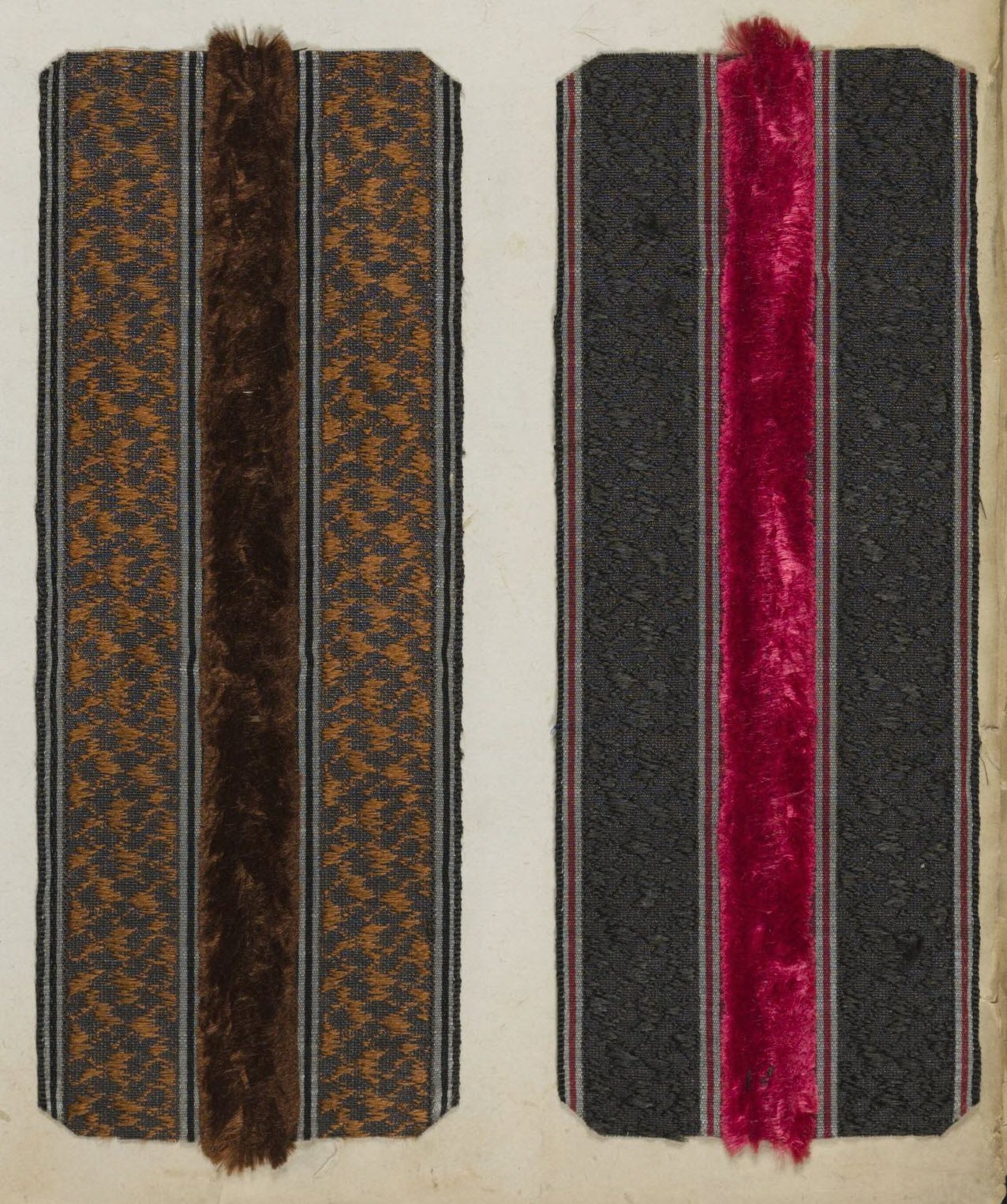
[Detail] Passementeries (1842). https://archive.org/stream/MAB.31962000742977Images/MAB.31962000742977_Images#page/n65/mode/2up

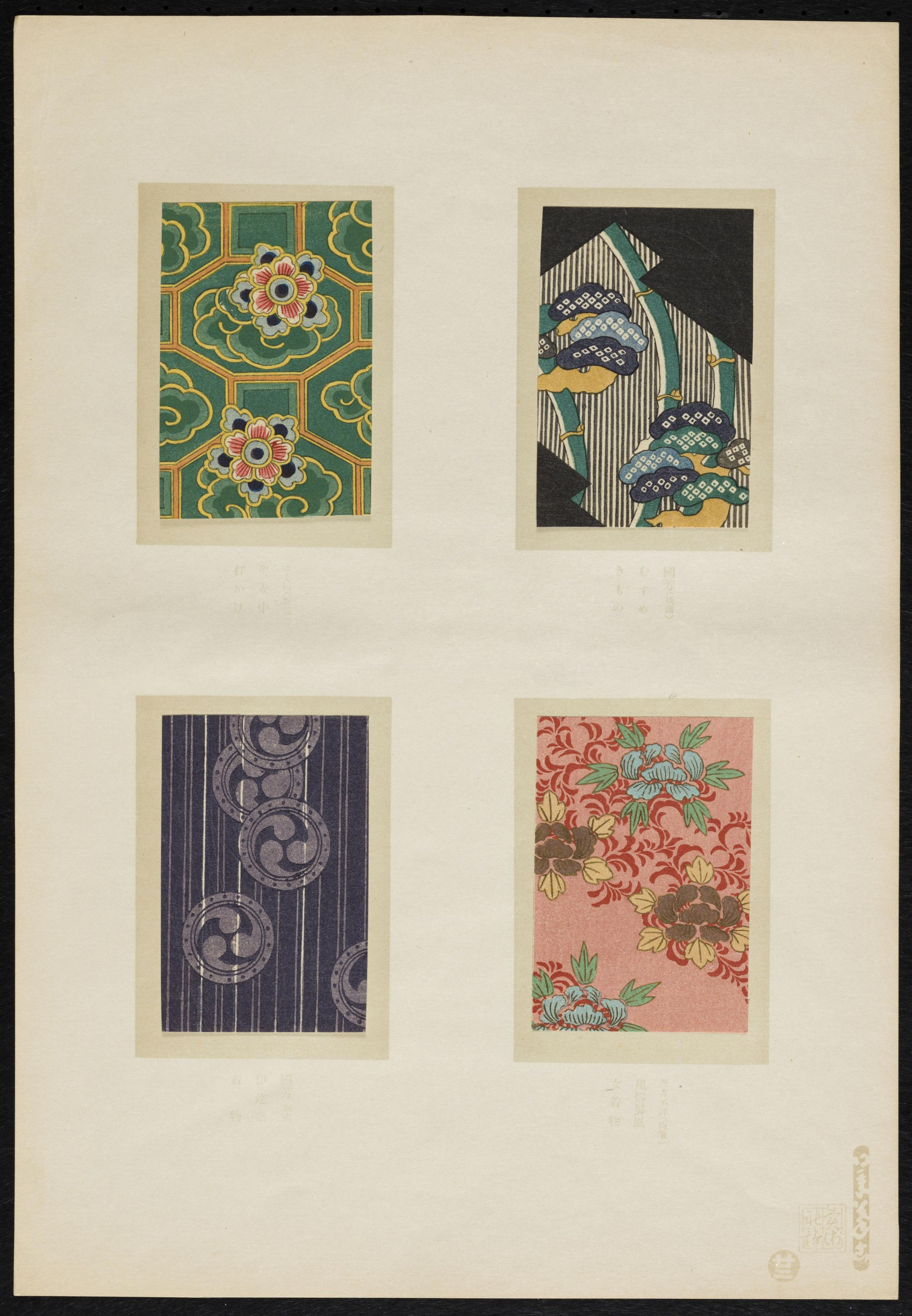
Japanese designs from Ukiyoe prints (1860?). https://archive.org/stream/MAB.31962000726566Images_20130507/MAB.31962000726566_Images#page/n13/mode/2up

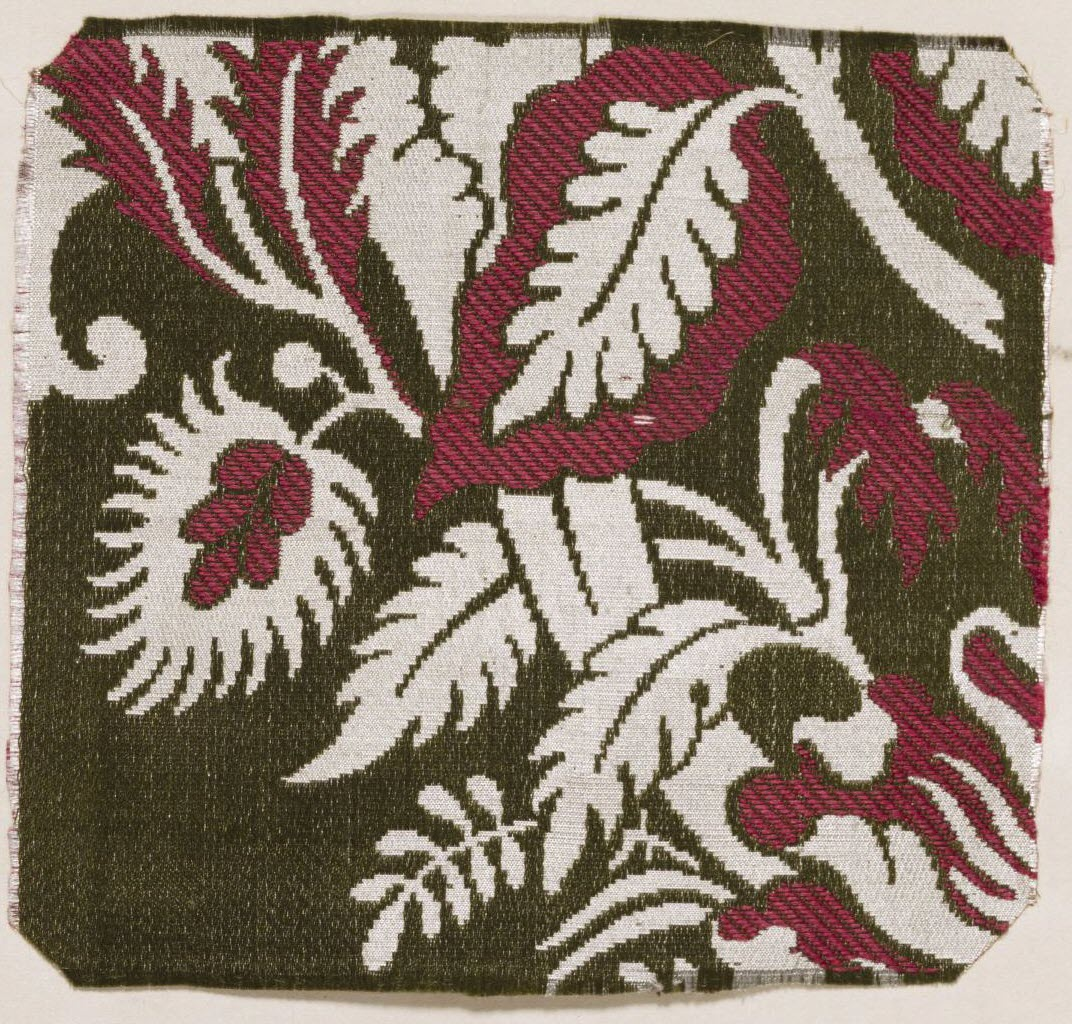
[Detail] [Weaving design book] (1890). https://archive.org/stream/MAB.31962000742555Images/MAB.31962000742555_Images#page/n39/mode/2up

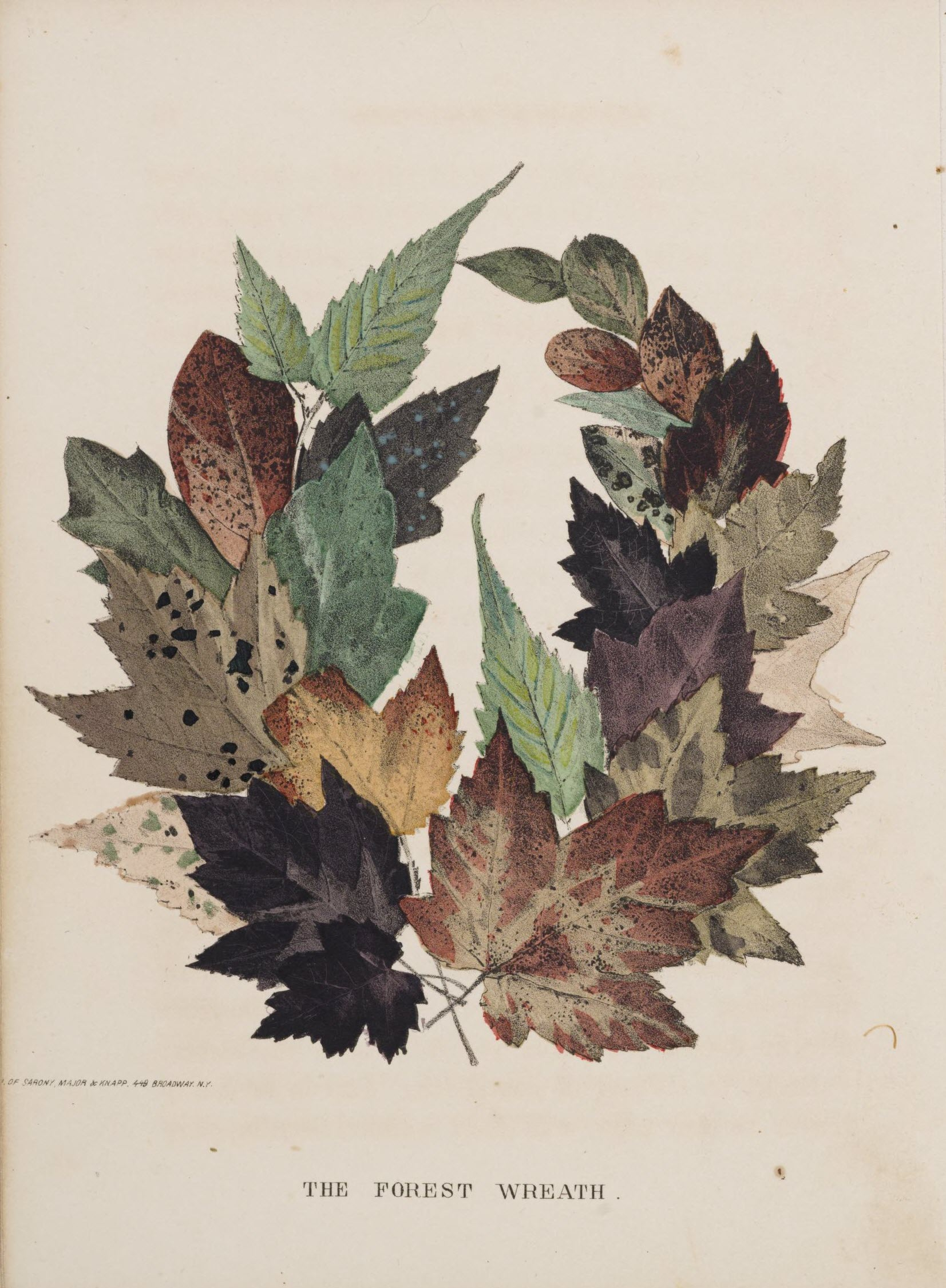
The Forest Wreath. Leaf and flower pictures, and how to make them (1859). https://archive.org/stream/MAB.NK1560L41859Images_201304/MAB.NK1560%20L4%201859_Images#page/n25/mode/2up

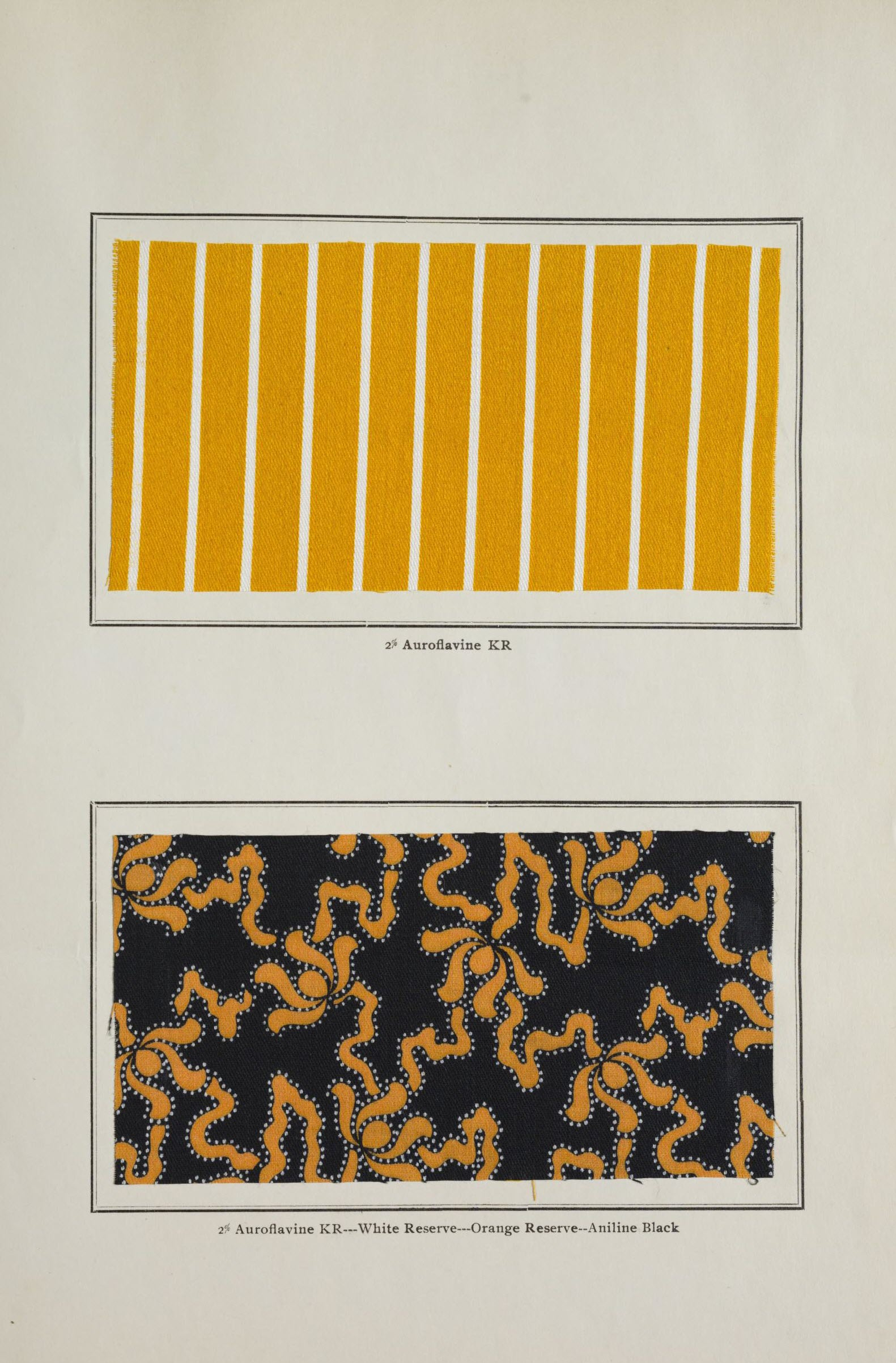
[Detail] New products manufactured by Farbwerke vorm. Meister Lucius & Brüning, Hoechst on the Main, Germany. (1900). https://archive.org/stream/MAB.31962004184572Images/MAB.31962004184572_Images#page/n59/mode/2up

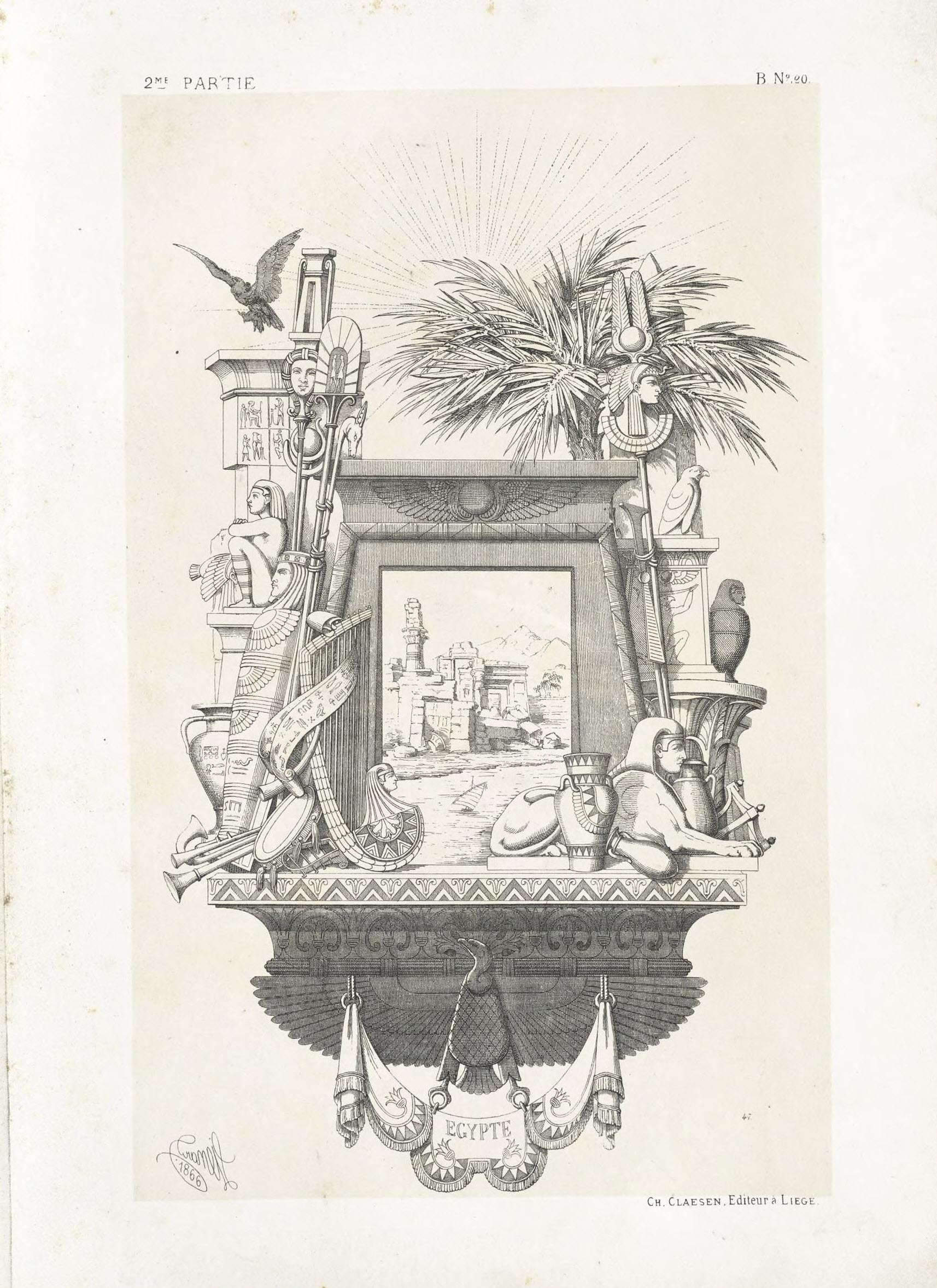
Egypte. Spécimens de la décoration et de l'ornementation au XIXe siècle (1872). https://archive.org/stream/CAI1077440001Images/CAI_107744_0001_Images#page/n133/mode/2up

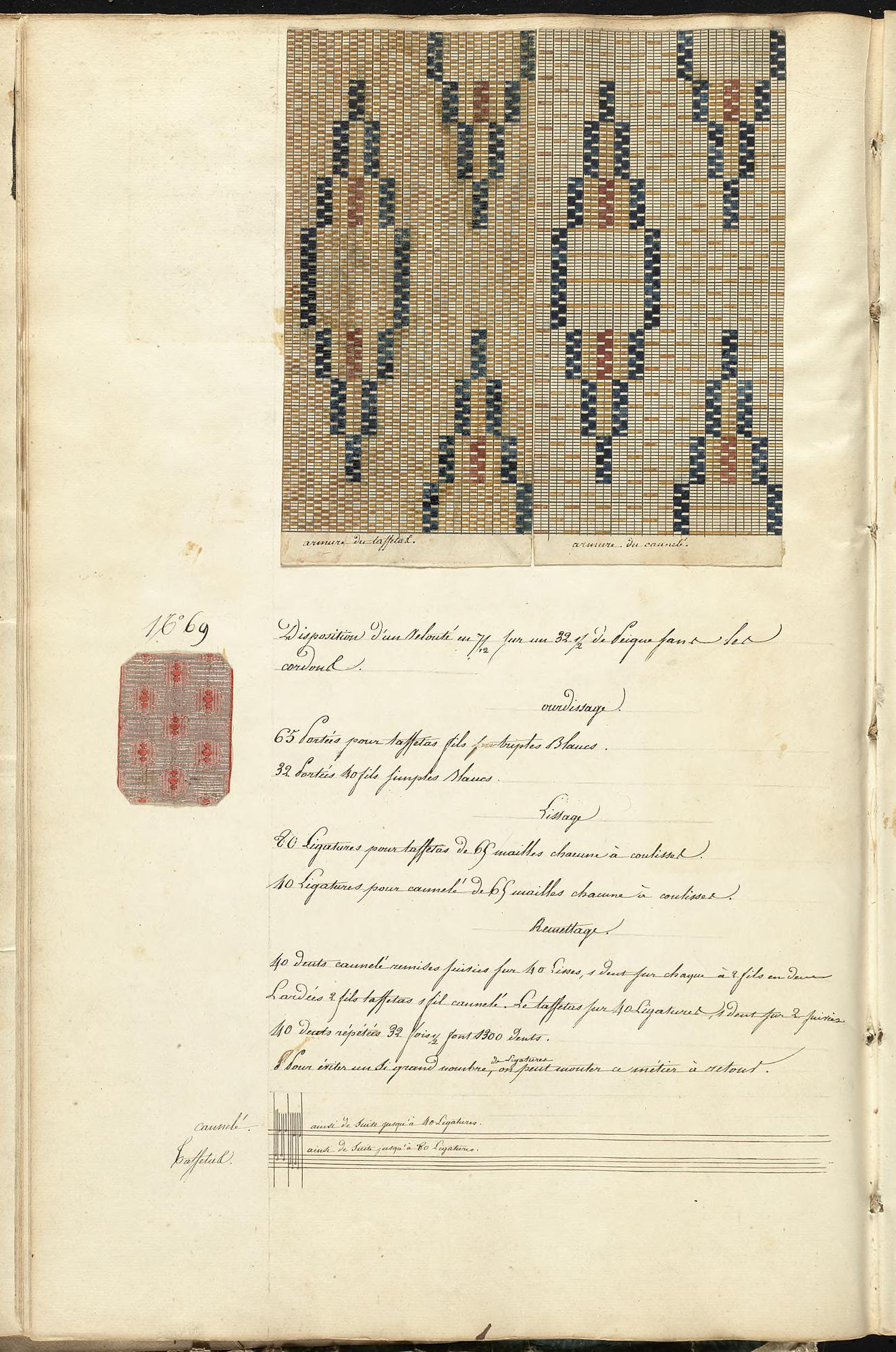
De la fabrique d'étoffes (1842). https://archive.org/stream/samplebookoffren00mais/b11719217#page/n61/mode/2up

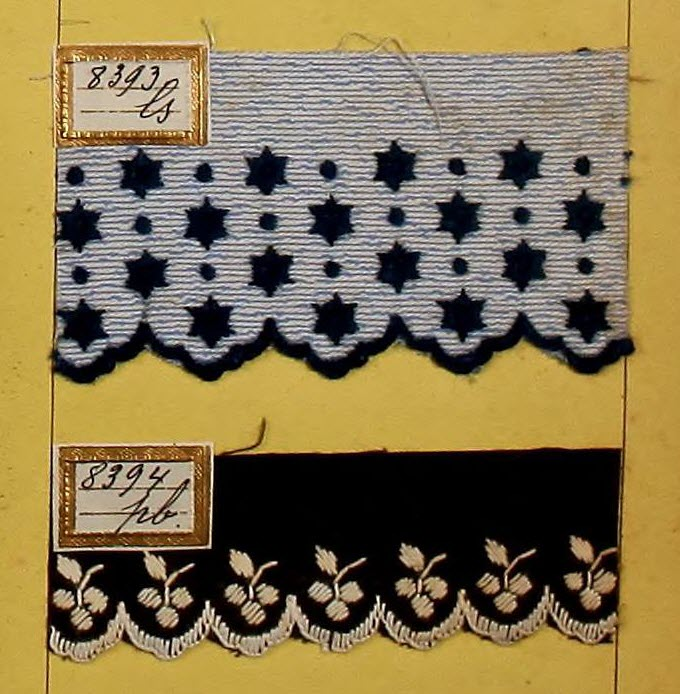
[Detail] Sample book of French embroidery (1850?). https://archive.org/stream/delafabriquedtof00unse#page/n76/mode/1up

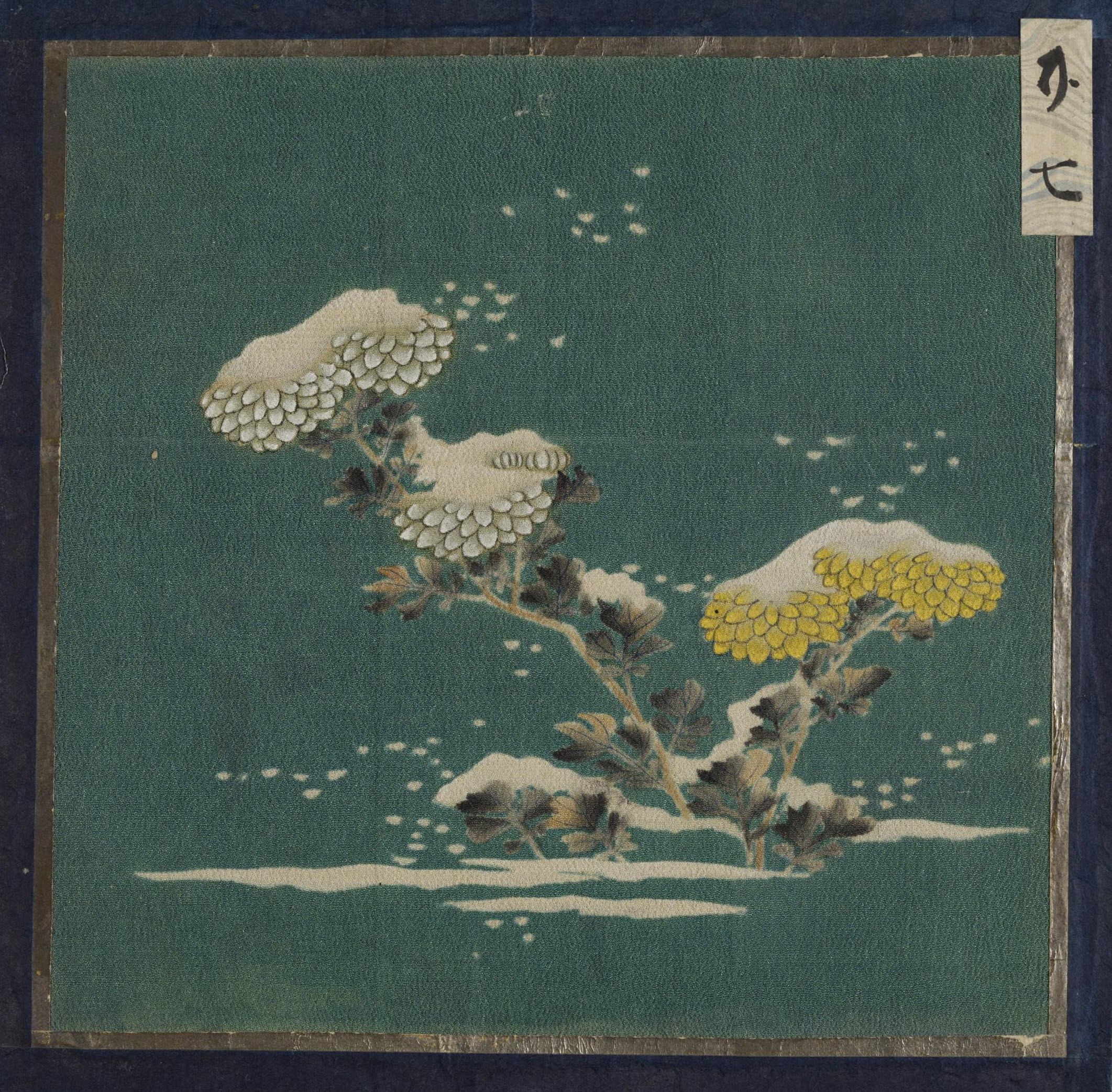
Japanese decorated silk (1700). https://archive.org/stream/MAB.31962000745236Images_20130422/MAB.31962000745236__images#page/n23/mode/2up

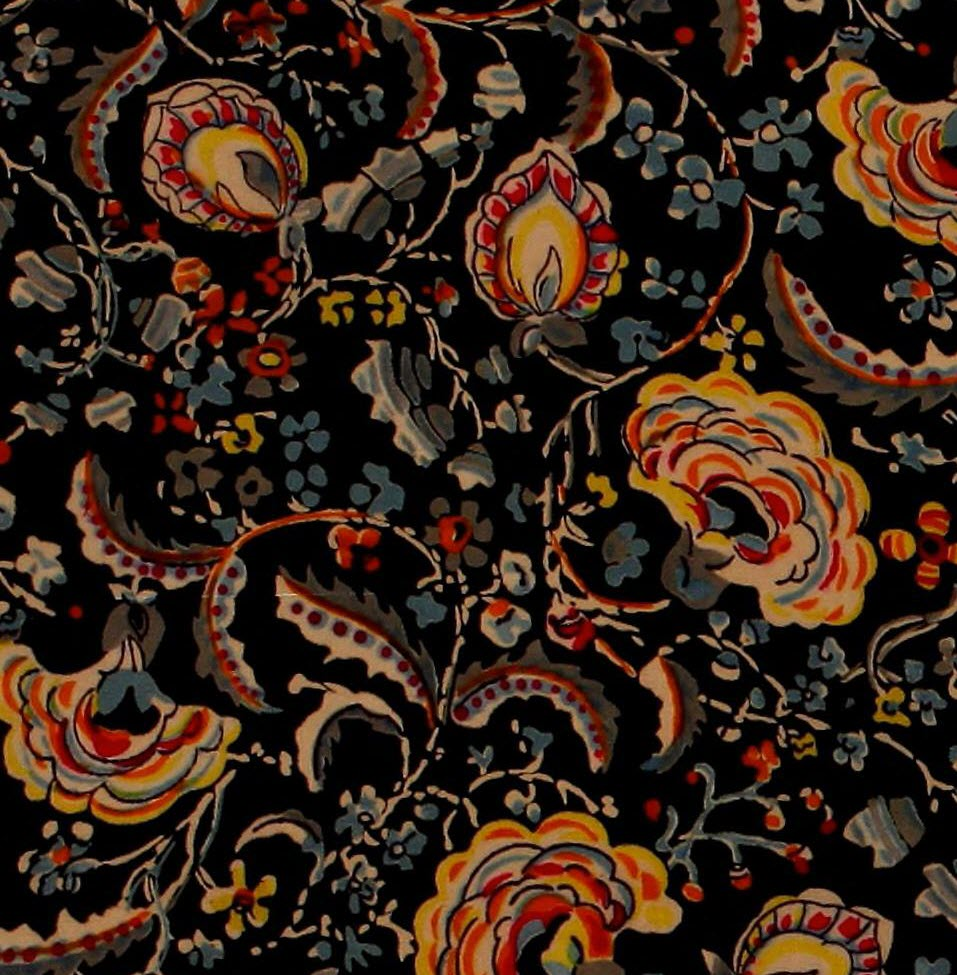
[Detail] French fabric sample book (1900). https://archive.org/stream/frenchfabricsamp00unse#page/15163/mode/2up

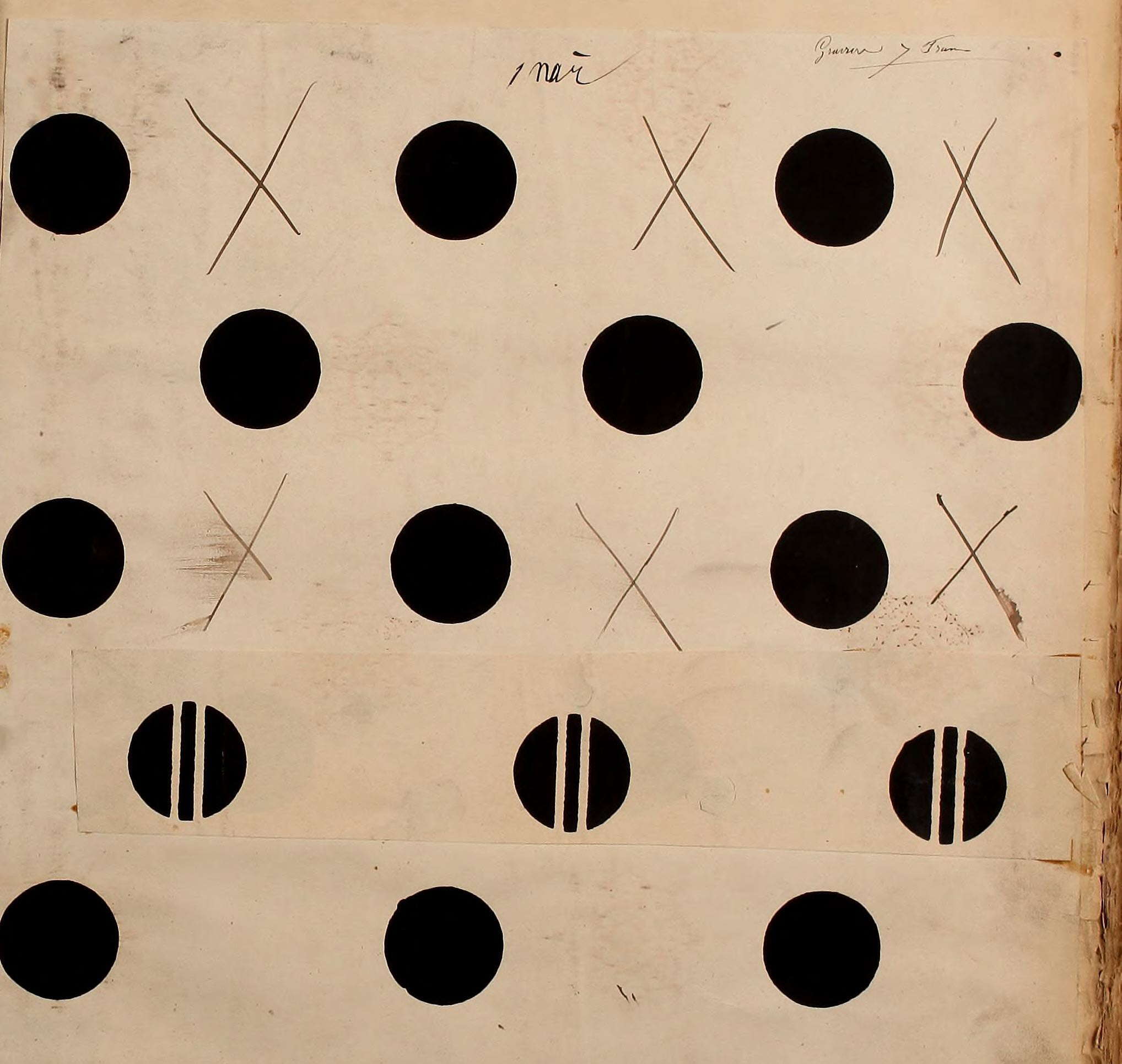
[Detail] [French textiles] (1863). https://archive.org/stream/frenchtextiles00unse#page/n47/mode/2up

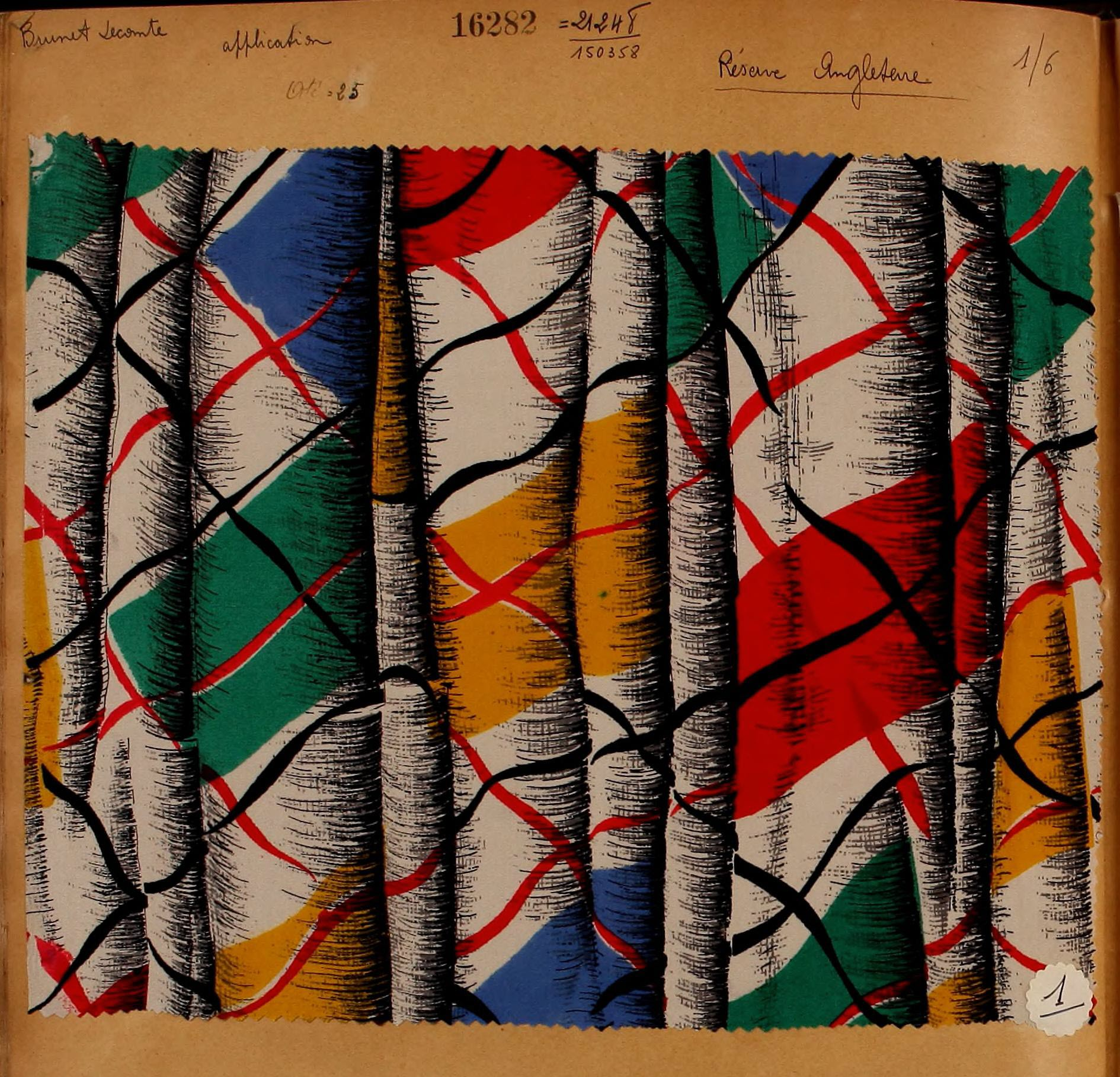
[Detail] [French silk sample book (1895). https://archive.org/stream/frenchsilksample00unse#page/n201/mode/2up

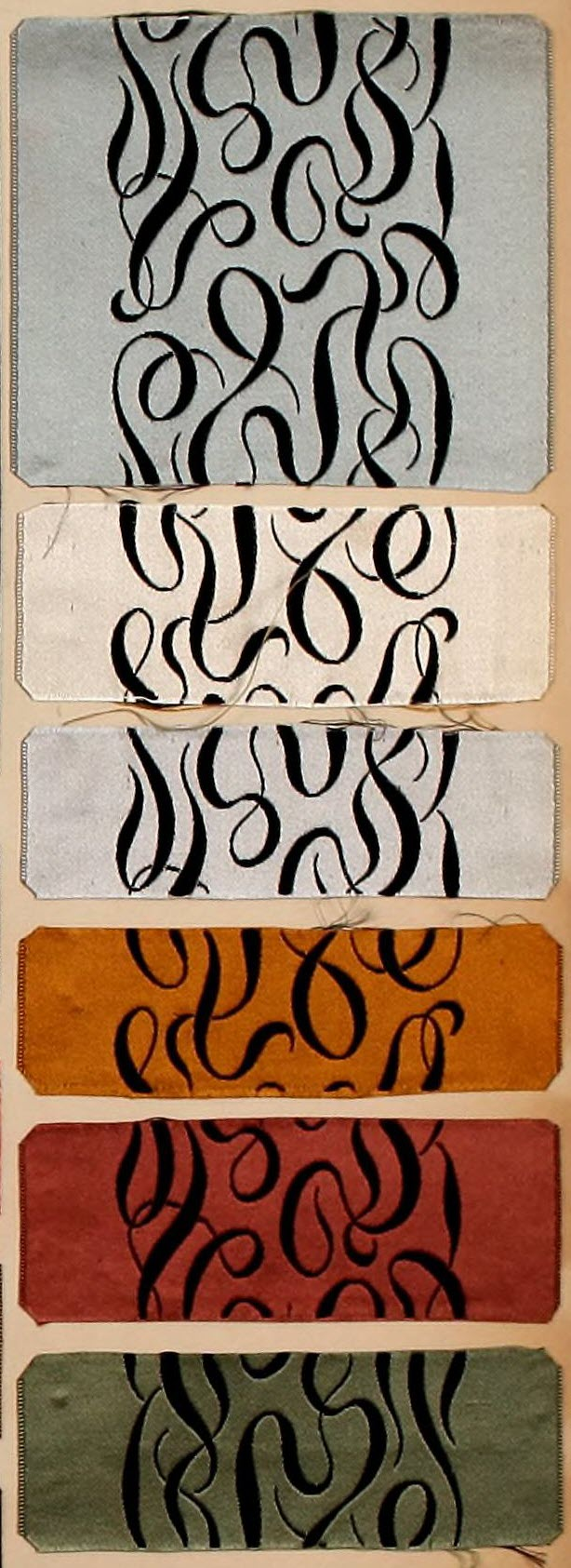
[Detail] [Silk ribbons and trims] (1886). https://archive.org/stream/silkribbonstrims00elem#page/n79/mode/1up

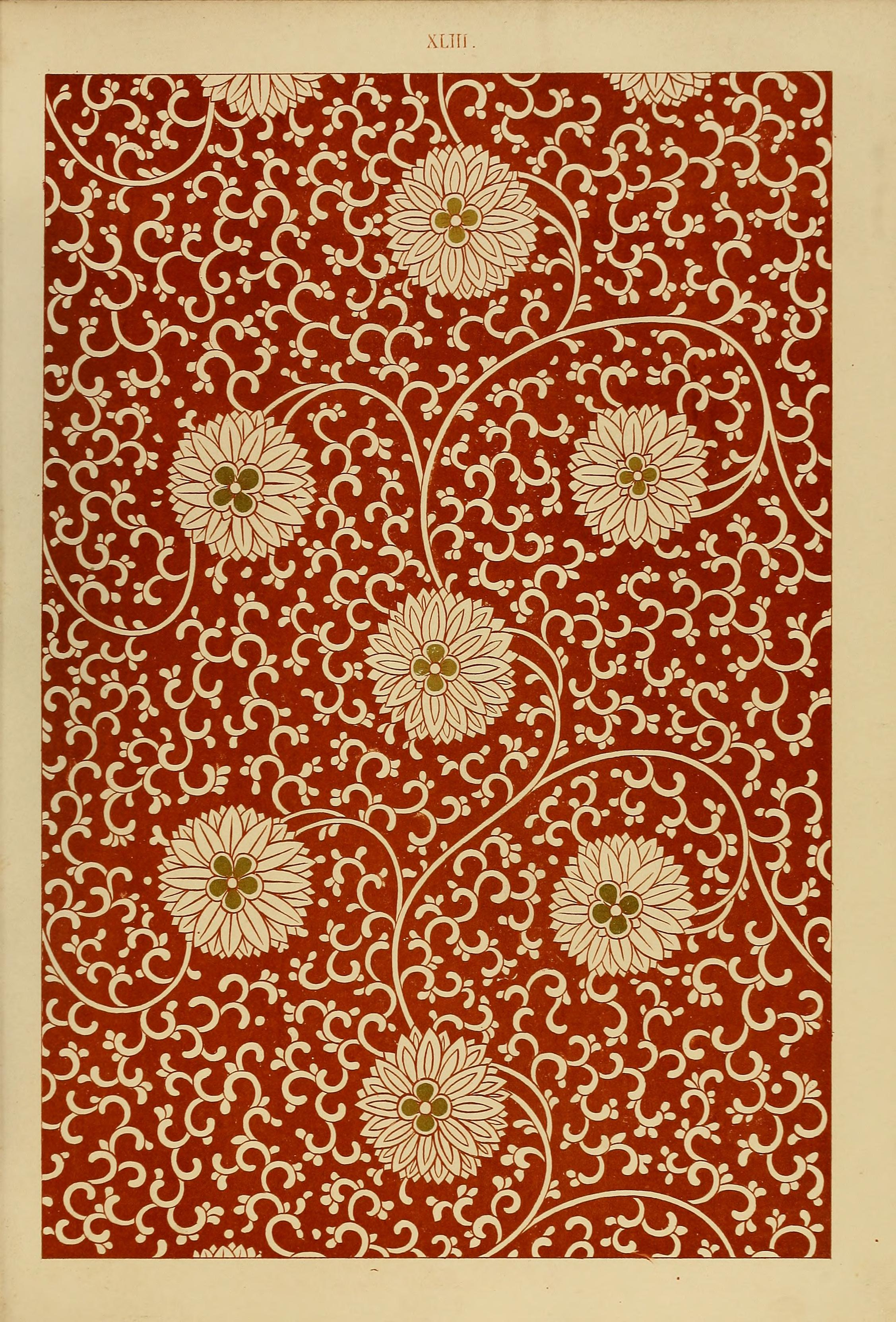
Examples of Chinese ornament selected from objects in the South Kensington museum and other collections (1867).
