= Frederik Christian Moltke =

Danish politician and landowner

Frederik Christian Moltke (20 August 1854 - 23 October 1936) was a Danish politician and landowner.

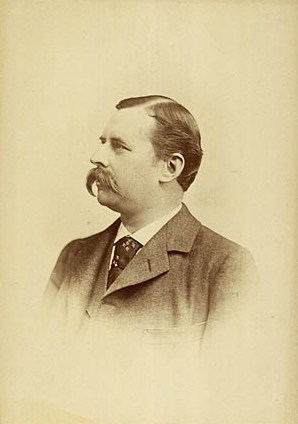
Frederik Christian Moltke

== Early life and education ==
Moltke was born on 20 August 1854 at Turebyholm, the eldest son of chamberlain Frederik Georg Julius Moltke (1825–75) and Caroline van der Maase (1827-1886). He graduated from Herlufsholm School in 1873 and then studied at the Royal Agricultural College before going on a longer journey abroad.

== Property ==
Moltke inherited the family's estates after his father's death in 1875 and took over the management of them in 1879. He Owned Bregentved, Turebyholm and Sofiedal. He completed a number of large construction projects on his estates in 1887-91 and supported agricultural development by making land available to a number of agricultural experiments.

His city home in Copenhagen was Moltke's Mansion in Frederiksstaden.

== Politics and public offices ==
Moltke was in 1880-1921 chairman of the Parish Council in Haslecv and in 1885-1920 president of the Agricultural Society (landboforening) in Præstø County. He was later elected for the governing bodies of several national organisations. He was president of the Danish Fishermen's Association (Dansk fiskeriforening)in 1887-1902, president of De Samvirkende Landboforeninger i Sjællands stift in 1910-24 and president of the Royal Danish Agricultural Society in 1911-30.

Moltke was in 1894-1910 a member of Landstinget as a representative of the 3rd Constituency. He was associated with the Højre party.

== Personal life and legacy ==
Moltke married Magdalene (Magda) Regitze Anna Emilie Estrup (8 November 1858 - 21 July 1928), a daughter of J. B. S. Estrup (1825-1913) and Regitze C. C. A. Holsten-Charisius (1831–96), on 2 June 1881 in the Citadel Church in Copenhagen. The couple had no children.

Moltke died at Bregentved on 23 October 1936 and is buried at Freerslev Church. He endowed the family's estates to Moltke's nephew, Christian Moltke (1895-1968).

== Honours ==
Moltke was created a Knight in the Order of the Dannebrog in 1885, a 2nd-order Commander of ht eOrder of the Dannebrog in 1913 and a 1st-order Commander in the Order of the Dannebrog in 1019. He was awarded the Order of Merit in 1892 and the Grand Cross in 1925.
