= Moltkia =

Moltkia is the scientific name of two genera of organisms and may refer to:

- Moltkia (coral), a genus of prehistoric octocorals
- Moltkia (plant), a genus of plants in the family Boraginaceae
