= Oluf Mouritsen Krognos =

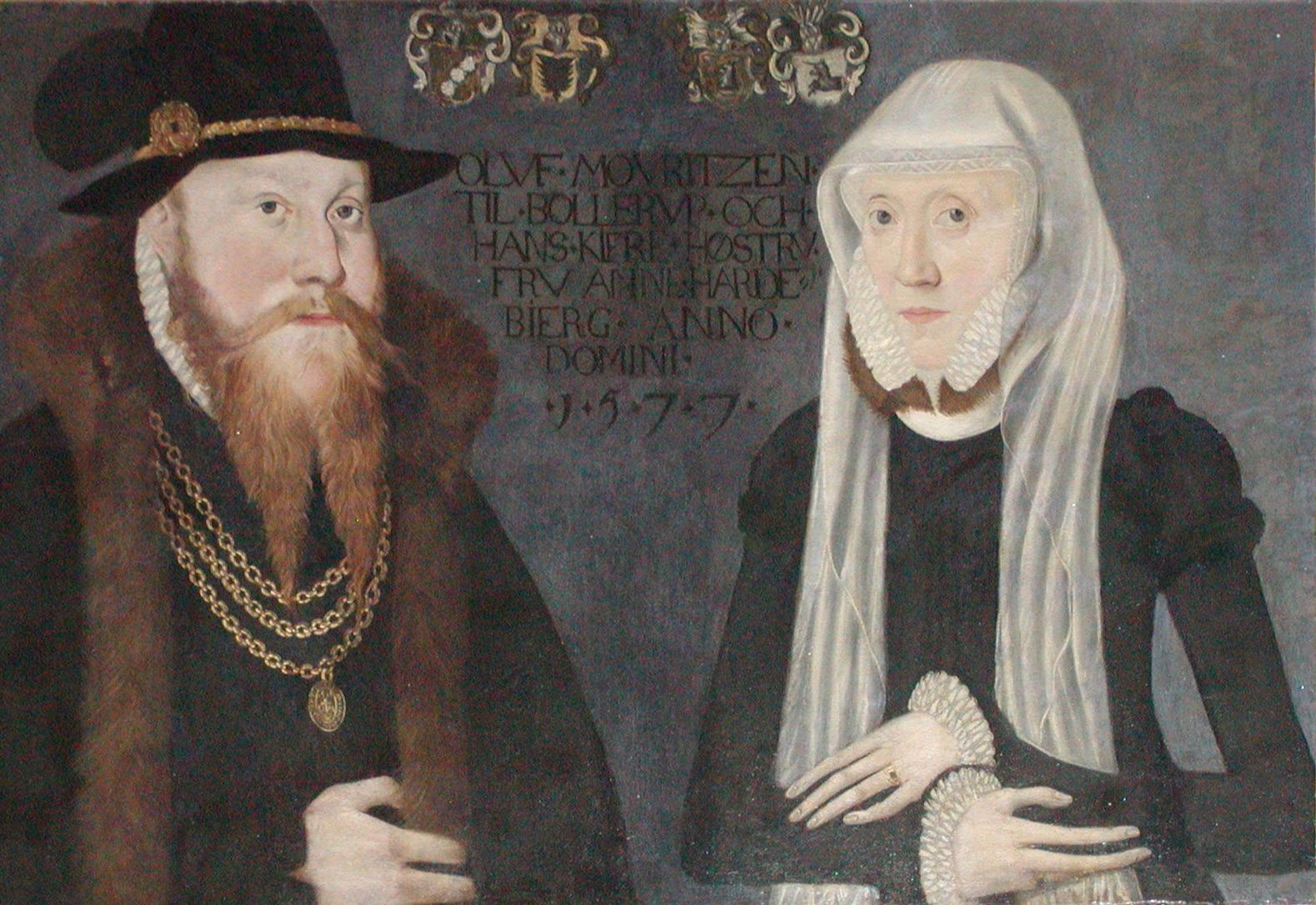
Oluf Krognos with his wife Anne of Hardenberg.

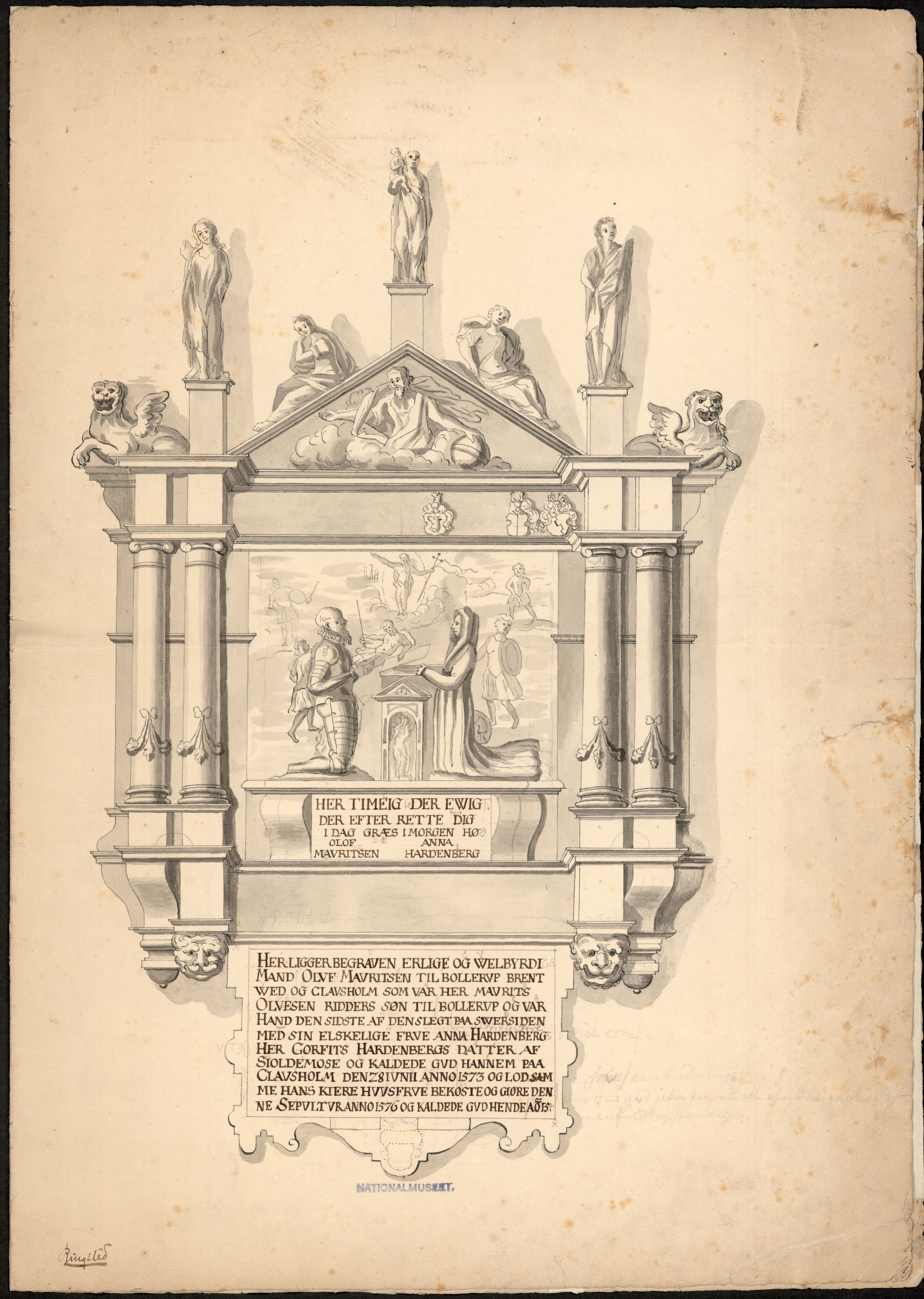
Krognos' tombstone in St. Bendt's Church, Eingsted.

Oluf Mouritsen Krognos (13 March 1535 – 25 June 1573) was a Danish nobleman, privy councillor and major landowner.

Krognos was born on 13 March 1535 at Bollerup, Scania, to Mourits Olufsen Krognos (died 1550) and Elline Gøye (c. 1510–1563). His father was one of the wealthiest landowners of his time. Krognos inherited the estates Bollerup, Bregentved, Clausholm, and Lerbæk (Vendsyssel).

In 1571, he was granted the Helsingborg fief. In January 1572, he was made a pricy councillor. On 11 January 1573 in the Church of Our Lady, he married Anne Hardenberg (died 1589). She was the daughter of Corfitz Hardenberg of Skjoldemose and Mette Skram (died c. 1548). He died less than half a year later and is buried in St. Bendt's Church in Ringsted.
