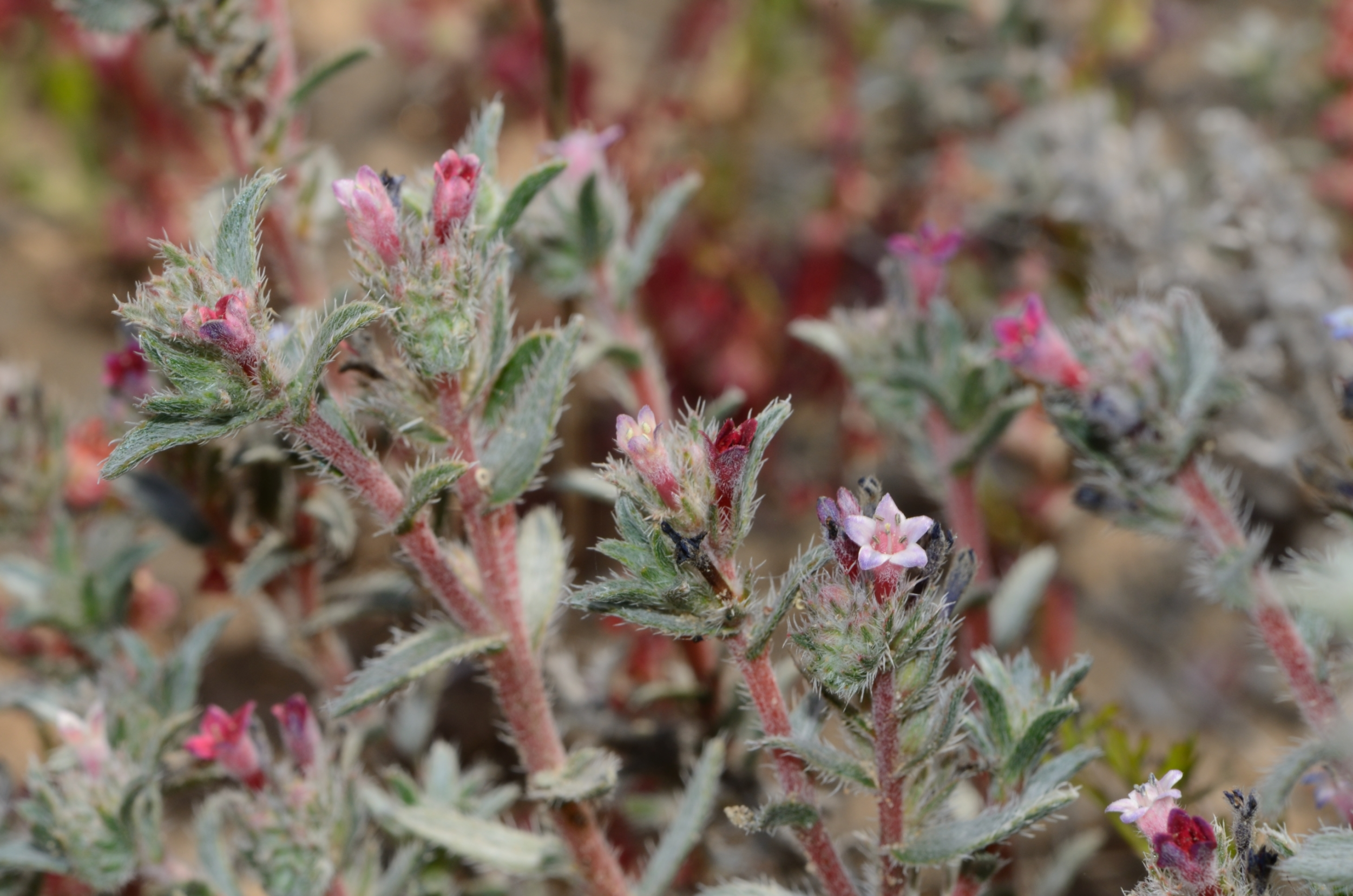
- Moltkiopsis ciliata

Scientific classification
- Kingdom: Plantae
- Clade: Tracheophytes
- Clade: Angiosperms
- Clade: Eudicots
- Clade: Asterids
- Order: Boraginales
- Family: Boraginaceae
- Genus: Moltkiopsis; I.M.Johnst.
- Species: M. ciliata

Binomial name
- Moltkiopsis ciliata (Forssk.) I.M.Johnst.

Synonyms
- Batschia fimbriata Nutt.; Lithospermum angustifolium Forssk.; Lithospermum callosum Vahl; Lithospermum ciliatum Forssk.; Lithospermum latifolium Forssk.; Lithospermum niveum Poir.; Margarospermum latifolium Decne.; Moltkia ciliata (Forssk.) Maire

= Moltkiopsis =

Genus of plants

Moltkiopsis is a monotypic genus of flowering plants belonging to the family Boraginaceae. The only species is Moltkiopsis ciliata.

Its native range is northern Africa to Sahel and the Arabian Peninsula. It is found in the regions of Algeria, Chad, Egypt, the Gulf States, Iran, Iraq, Kuwait, Libya, Mali, Mauritania, Morocco, Niger, Oman, Palestine, Saudi Arabia, Sinai, Sudan, Tunisia and the western Sahara.

The genus name of Moltkiopsis is in honour of Joachim Godske Moltke (1746–1818), the Prime Minister of Denmark from 1814 to 1818. He was also father of Prime Minister Adam Wilhelm Moltke and the son of Danish diplomat Adam Gottlob Moltke. The Latin specific epithet of ciliata is derived from ciliatus meaning fringed. Both genus and species were first described and published in J. Arnold Arbor. Vol.34 on pages 2-3 in 1953.
