= Turebyholm =

Manor house near Copenhagen, Denmark

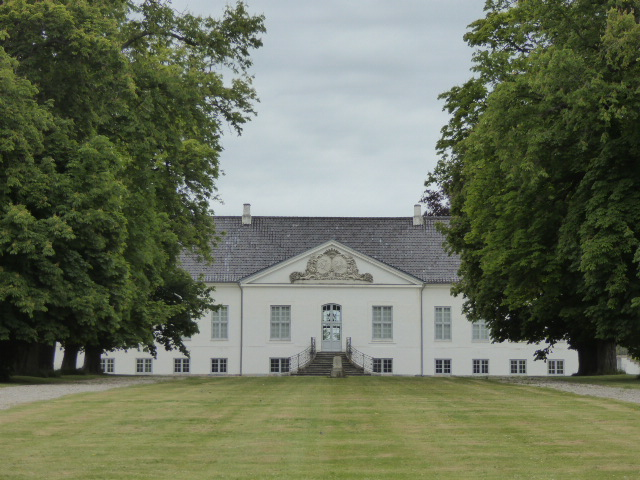
- Turebyholm Manor House

General information
- Architectural style: Rococo
- Location: Turebyholmvej 22; 4682 Tureby, Denmark
- Coordinates: 55°20′50.86″N 12°5′34.37″E
- Completed: 1750

Design and construction
- Architect: Niels Eigtved

Turebyholm is a manor house in Faxe Municipality, some fifty kilometres southwest of Copenhagen, Denmark. It was acquired by Adam Gottlob Moltke in 1746 and has remained in the hands of the Moltke family to the present day. It was part of the Countship of Bregentved from 1756 to 1920 and still shares its ownership with the Bregentved estate. The current Rococo-style main building was constructed by royal architect Niels Eigtved in 1750. It was listed on the Danish registry of protected buildings and places in 1918.

== History ==
=== Early history ===
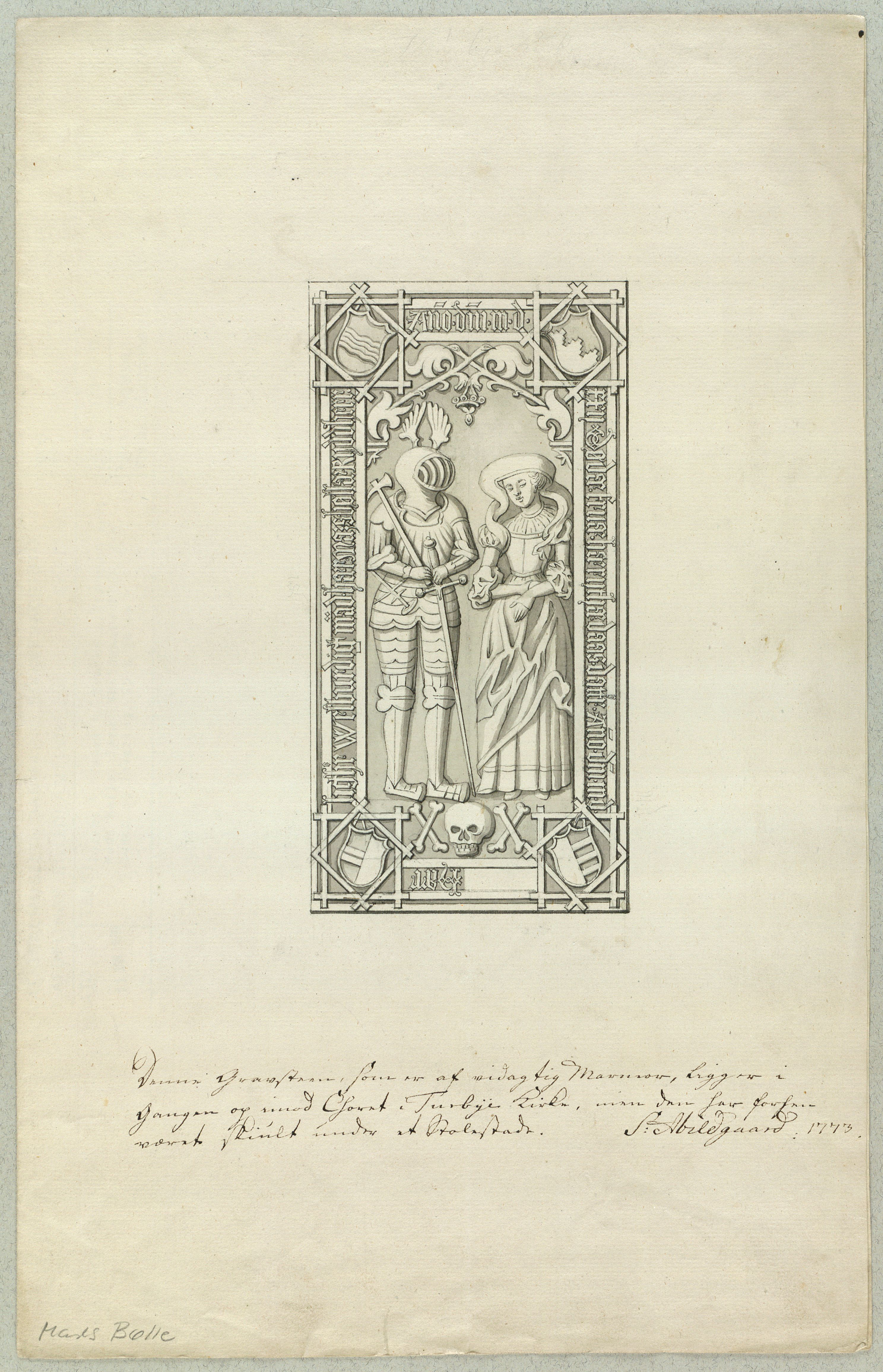
The ledgerstone of Mads Bølle in Tureby Church. Drawing by Søren Abildgaard, 1773.

Turebyholm was originally located in the no longer existing village of Tureby. In the Middle Ages it belonged to the episcopal see of Roskilde. The earliest known lensmann was Jens Jensen, who is mentioned in 1375.

Mads Eriksen Bølle was in 1505 granted Turebyholm for life for himself, his wife and his son. Bølle was opposed to Christian III and the introduction of Protestantism but was nonetheless allowed to keep his fief after the Crown confiscated all church land after the Reformation. Mads Bølle is buried in the adjacent Tureby Church.

=== Gøye family ===
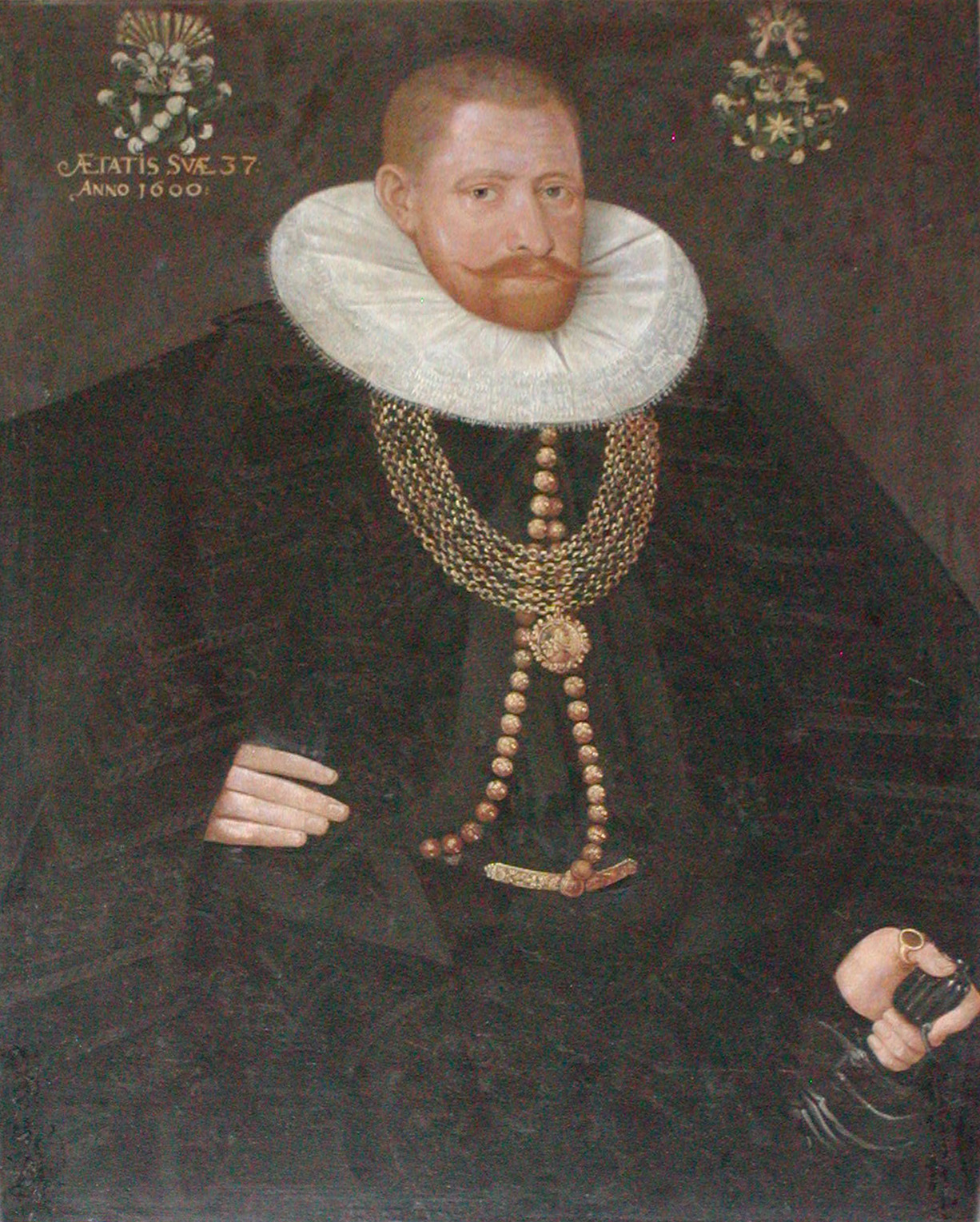
Henrik Gøye

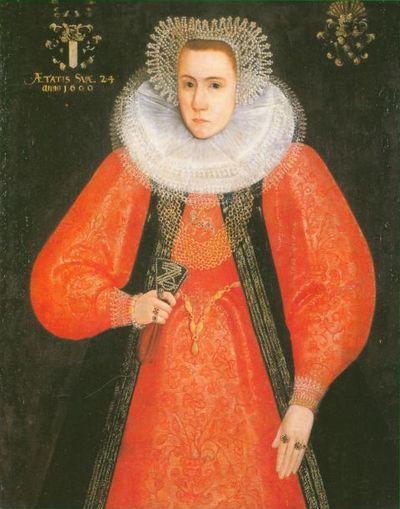
Birgitte Brahe

Turebyholm was in 1604 acquired by Henrik Gøye in exchange for other property. The fief also comprised four farms and 12 houses in the village and around a hundred copyholds scattered across a large area. Turebyholm was in the same time granted the status of birk.Gøye dissolved the remaining four farms in Tureby and placed the land directly under the manor.

Henrik Gøye was married to Birgitte Axeldatter Brahe. She kept Turebyholm after his death in 1611. After her own death in 1619, Turebyholm was passed to two of their sons, Eskild and Otto, who had been brought up by Holger Rosenkrantz, Birgitte Brahe's brother-in-law, after their father's death. In 1621, Otto Gøye bought Eskild's share of the estate. Otto Gøye was married to the learned Birgitte Thott. After Otto Gøye's death in 1642, Turebyholm passed to his brother, Eskild, but he allowed Birgitte Thott to stay on the estate. She made several of her translations while she lived at Turebyholm. Thott led a quiet life at Turebyholm but had to flee to Sorø during the Second Northern War when Swedish troops ravaged and looted on Zealand

In Eskild Gøye's death in 1664, Turebygaard passed to Henrik Gøye.

=== Reedtz and Thott families ===
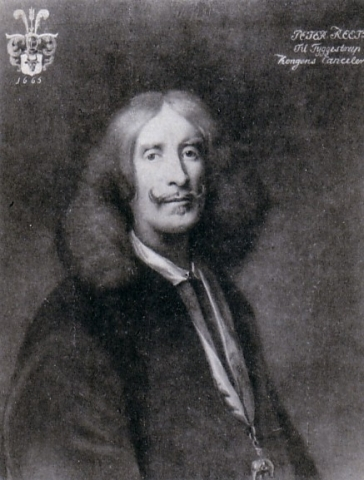
Peder Reedtz

In 1667, Turebyholm was acquired by Peder Reedtz, the owner of Tygestrup, Mindstrup and Palsgaard. He expanded the manor with more land.

Reedtz left Turebyholm heavily in debts to his widow, Anne Ramel, who managed to keep it until her death. The estate was then passed on to their daughter, Sophie Reedtz, who was married to Tage Thott. Thott was a Scanian nobleman who had fled to Denmark after the war. Sophie Reedtz kept the estate after her husband's death in 1707.

=== Crown land ===
In 1720, Sophie Reedtz sold Turebuholm to the crown. The estate was then included in one of the 12 cavalry districts. The main building was used as military barracks and the fields were used for grazing. Turebyholm Church was expanded to make room for the hussards.

=== Moltke family ===
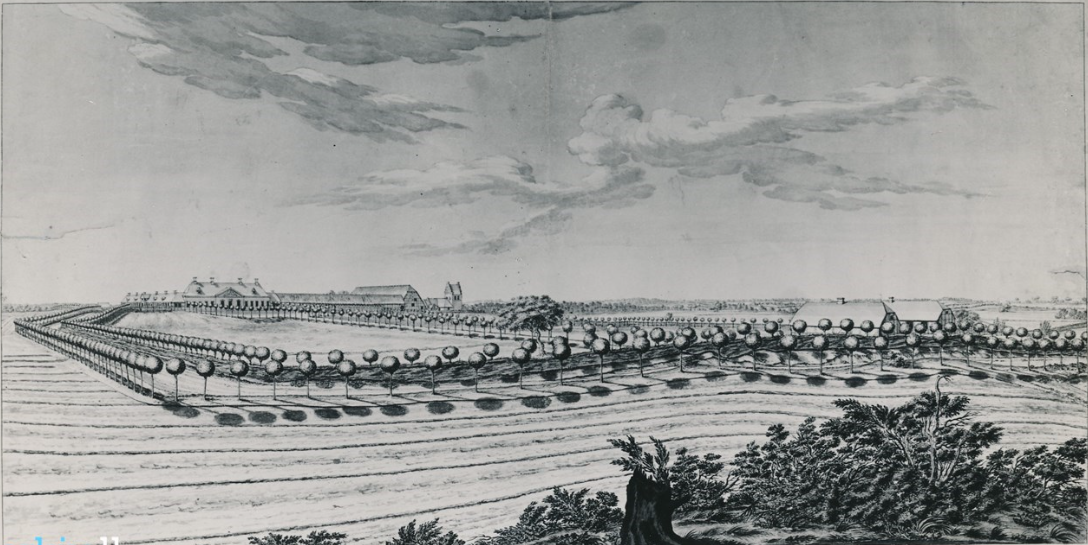
Turebyholm in c. 17701

In 1747, Turebyholm was sold to Adam Gottlob Moltke. In 1750, when Moltke was created count, Turebyholm formed part of the new countship of Bregentved. The old main building was adapted into a pleasure pavilion which was used when the king visited him on the estate.

Turebyholm was part of the countship of Bregentved until its dissolution in 1920. It was then used as a farm under Bregentved manor.

== Architecture ==
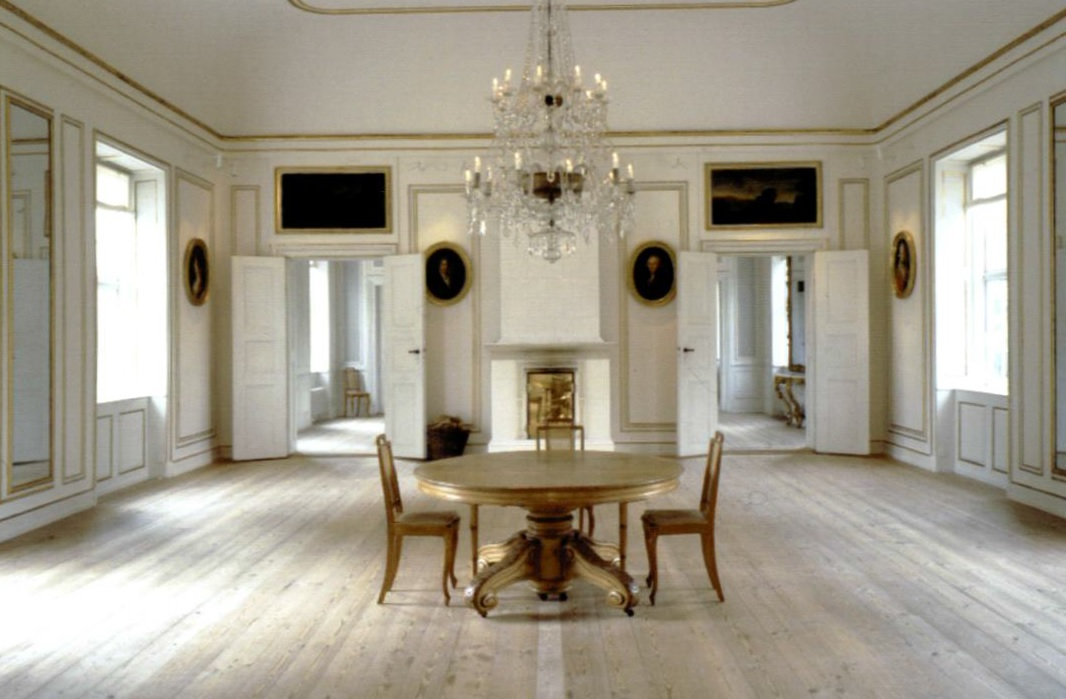
The interior.

The main building consists of one story over a high cellar. Both sides of the building feature a median risalit tipped by a triangular pediment with sandstone ornamentation. The roof is a hipped, black-glazed tile roof with four chimneys. The building was listed on the Danish registry of protected buildings and places in 1918. It underwent a comprehensive refurbishment in the 1990s and 2000s received an award from Eiropa Nostra.

In a small grove to the north of the main building is a small underground ice house topped by a pavilion. It dates from the 18th century and is also listed.

== Today ==
The current owner of the estate is Christian Georg Peter Moltke.

== List of owners ==
- ( -1536) Bishopric of Roskilde
- (1536-1604) The Crown
- (1604-1611) Henrik Gøye
- (1611-1619) Birgitte Brahe Axelsdatter, gift Gøye
- (1619-1631) Eskild Gøye
- (1619-1642) Otto Gøye
- (1642-1647) Eskild Gøye
- (1642-1667) Henrik Gøye
- (1667-1672) Peder Reedtz
- (1672-1702) Anne Ramel Henriksdatter, gift Reedtz
- (1702) Arvingerne efter ægteparret Reedtz
- (1702-1707) Tage Thott
- (1707-1720) Petra Sophie Reedtz, gift Thott
- (1720-1747) The Crown
- (1746-1792) Adam Gottlob Moltke
- (1792-1818) Joachim Godske Moltke
- (1818-1864) Adam Wilhelm Moltke
- (1864-1875) Frederik Georg Julius Moltke
- (1875-1936) Frederik Christian Moltke
- (1936-1968) Christian Frederik Gustav Moltke
- (1968-1995) Hans Hemming Joachim Christian Moltke
- (1995- ) Christian Georg Peter Moltke
