= Freerslev Church =

Coordinates: 55°19′31″N 12°00′58″E

- Freerslev Kirke
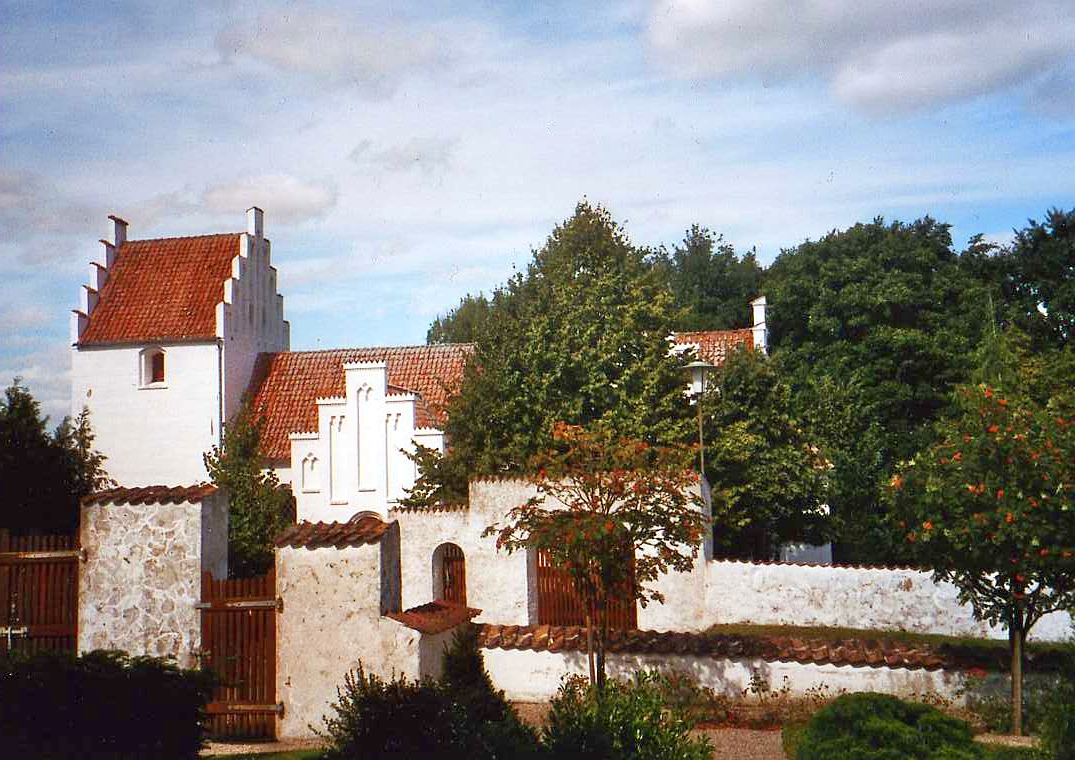
- Freerslev Church
- Country: Denmark
- Denomination: Church of Denmark

Administration
- Diocese: Diocese of Roskilde
- Deanery: Tryggevælde Provsti
- Parish: Freerslev Sogn

Freerslev Church (Danish: Freerslev Kirke) is located in the Danish Diocese of Roskilde, Faxe Municipality in Region Sjælland on the island of Zealand. Parts of the original Romanesque church subsist today although there have been substantial Gothic additions. Primitive 14th-century frescos have been uncovered in the arch of an old window on the north wall.

== History ==
The Romanesque sections of the church probably date from the beginning of the 13th century but the first documented reference is in the Bishop of Roskilde's Taxation Book (Roskildebispens Jordebog) c. 1370. In 1672 Hans Schack, who had bought the nearby Gisselfeld estate the year before, was granted jus patronatus ownership. In 1762, the church was sold to the statesman Adam Gottlob Moltke (1710-1792) of Bregentved. It gained its independence in 1911.

== Architecture ==
Located south of the village of Freerslev on a hilltop between Haslev and the E47 motorway, Freerslev Church dates back to c. 1200. Of the original Romanesque church, the north and south walls of the nave, built of Faxe limestone, still remain. At the centre of the north wall, a window from the original building was reopened in 1914. Probably as far back as the 13th century, the nave was lengthened towards the west, the lateral walls being constructed of chalk and fieldstone while the gable was brick. In the 14th century, the tower was added, only two storeys high, decorated with belts of brick and chalk. The outer walls are decorated with nine vertical blank windows.

The porch was originally built of brick in the late Middle Ages but was later heightened while new doors and windows were added. In 1886–87, the old chancel was demolished. An old grave containing two skeletons was discovered, possibly dating from a former wooden church. The chancel was rebuilt in yellow brick with a semi-circular apse.

== Interior ==
The granite font in the Romanesque style has rope-like framing around 11 rounded segments and a thicker rope decoration just above the base. The decorated baptismal bowl from c. 1550 was created at the Nuremberg workshop. The high Renaissance altarpiece from c. 1600 is in fir, its wing decorations flanking the text of the Lord's Prayer. The more recent headpiece contains a picture of the Resurrection. The Renaissance pulpit and its canopy are the work of artists from Næstved. The chancel was fully restored and repainted in 1989. The Marcussen organ with seven registers was installed in 1960.

=== Frescoes ===
The arch of the Romanesque window at the centre of the north wall is decorated with 14th-century russet-brown frescos which were rediscovered in 1914 after being limewashed at the time of the Reformation. They depict a stylized tree with triangular leaves flanked by two crosses and a bird perched on a lily.
