= Listed buildings in Faxe Municipality =

This is a list of listed buildings in Faxe Municipality, Denmark.

== List ==
=== 4640 Faxe ===
Listing name	Image	Location	Coordinates	Description
Blåbæk Watermill		Blåbækvej 5, 4640 Faxe	55°14′16.12″N 12°7′0.28″E	Residential wing
Blåbæk Watermill		Blåbækvej 5, 4640 Faxe	55°14′16.12″N 12°7′0.28″E	Stampemølle
Blåbæk Watermill		Blåbækvej 5, 4640 Faxe	55°14′16.12″N 12°7′0.28″E	Barn
Blåbæk Watermill		Blåbækvej 5, 4640 Faxe	55°14′16.12″N 12°7′0.28″E	Watermill
Blåbæk Watermill		Blåbækvej 5, 4640 Faxe	55°14′16.12″N 12°7′0.28″E	Stable wing
Blåbæk Windmill		Blåbækvej 3, 4640 Faxe	55°14′22.34″N 12°7′5.28″E	Smock mill from 1838
Fakse Ladeplads		Strandvejen 98A, 4654 Faxe Ladeplads	55°12′18.61″N 12°8′44.91″E	
Fakse Ladeplads		Strandvejen 98A, 4654 Faxe Ladeplads	55°12′18.61″N 12°8′44.91″E	
Jomfruens Egede		Kirkevej 1A and 7, 4640 Faxe	55°16′51.17″N 12°5′24″E	The main wing (south wing) from c. 1500-1550 which was lengthened westwards and strongly adapted in 1797 by C. F. Harsdorff and the cross wing from 1797 by C. F. Harsdorff
Jomfruens Egede		Kirkevej 1A and 7, 4640 Faxe	55°16′51.17″N 12°5′24″E	Storage building (north wing) which probably dates from 1636 but has later been adapted
Lystrup		Lystrupvej 9, 4640 Faxe	55°15′42.77″N 12°3′49.73″E	Renaissance-style manor house from 1579
Prince Carl's School		Nordhøjvej 6, 4640 Faxe	55°16′23.32″N 12°15′40.72″E	Half-timbered building from 1719
Rosendal		Rosendalvej 3, 4640 Faxe	55°13′29.76″N 12°6′44.38″E	
Rosendal		Rosendalvej 3, 4640 Faxe	55°13′29.76″N 12°6′44.38″E	
Rosendal		Rosendalvej 3, 4640 Faxe	55°13′29.76″N 12°6′44.38″E	
Rosendal		Rosendalvej 3, 4640 Faxe	55°13′29.76″N 12°6′44.38″E	
Rasmus Svendsen's School		Nørregade 9, 4640 Faxe	55°15′38.94″N 12°7′4.07″E	Half-timbered building from 1641 with later extensions to the north and south as well as the surrounding cobbling

=== 4653 Karise ===
Listing name	Image	Location	Coordinates	Description
Karisse Church: The church barn		Kildevej 1A, 4653 Karise	55°18′20.81″N 12°12′33.31″E	A church barn from circa 1500

=== 4690 Haslev ===
Listing name	Image	Location	Coordinates	Description
Bregentved		Moltkesvej 78, 4690 Haslev	55°18′25.69″N 12°0′23.41″E	The north wing from the 17th century which was adapted in circa 1740 aby iels Eigtved and the interior chapel from 1735 by Lauritz de Thurah and Johann Friedrich Hännel
Bregentved		Moltkesvej 78, 4690 Haslev	55°18′25.69″N 11°58′13.54″E	The east and south wings from 1889-92 by Axel Berg
Gisselfeld		Gisselfeldvej 3, 4690 Haslev	55°17′30.28″N 12°0′23.41″E	Main building
Gisselfeld		Gisselfeldvej 5, 4690 Haslev	55°17′20.63″N 11°58′13.5″E	
Gisselfeld		Gisselfeldvej 5, 4690 Haslev	55°17′20.63″N 11°58′13.5″E	
Turebyholm		Turebyholmvej 14, 4682 Tureby	55°21′46.85″N 12°5′2.16″E	Ice house (cellar) topped by pavilion
Turebyholm		Turebyholmvej 16, 4682 Tureby	55°20′50.87″N 12°5′34.35″E	Manor house from 1750 by Niels Eigtved
