= Rosendal (manor house) =

Rosenlund
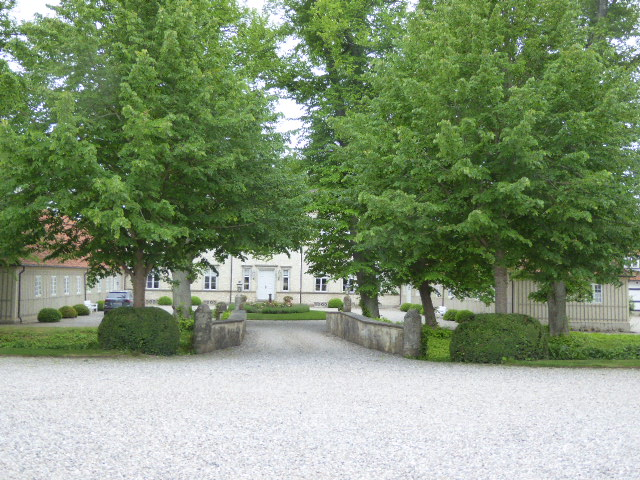
- The main building hidden behind trees in 2020
- Interactive map of the Rosenlund area

General information
- Architectural style: Michael Gottlieb Bindesbøll
- Location: Rosendalvej 3; 4640 Faxe, Denmark
- Coordinates: 55°13′30″N 12°6′39.6″E
- Completed: 1840 (main wing)

Rosendal is a manor house and estate located 3.5 km south of Faxe in southeastern Denmark. It was until 1781 mostly owned by the intermarried Rosenkrantz and Juul families. The three-winged main building and the three-winged home farm (avlsgården) were listed on the Danish registry of protected buildings and places in 1950. The two-storey main wing is from 1849 and was designed by Michael Gottlieb Bindesbøll but some of the other buildings date from the 17th century. Rosendal is now owned by the Hong Kong-based Danish shipping Jebsen family.

== History ==
=== The Rosenkrantz and Juul families ===
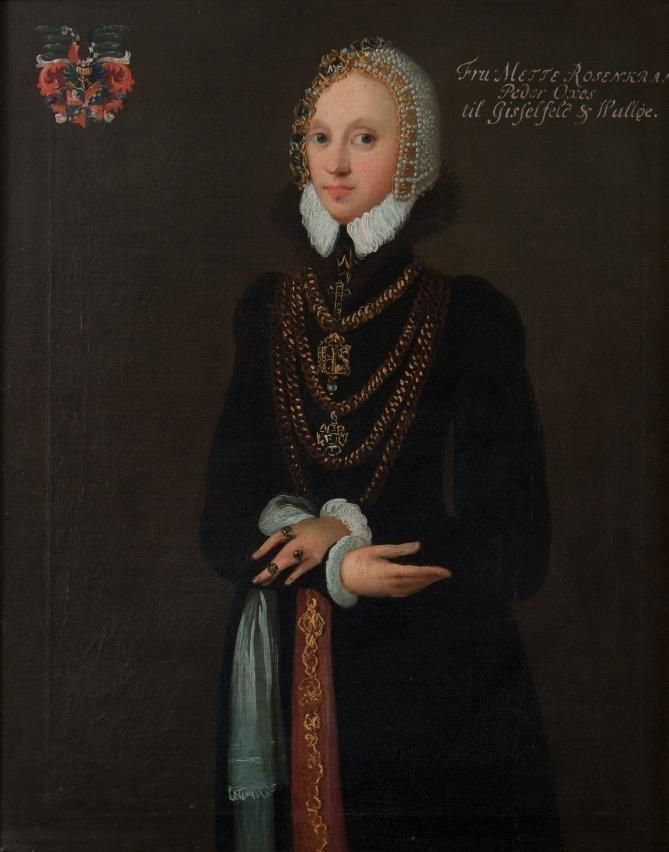
Mette Rosenkrantz

The estate was originally called Totterupholm and was created when Ide Munk, the widow of Oluf Rosenkrantz, merged the farms in the village of Totterup into a single manor circa 1560. Oluf Rosenkrantz had been the wealthiest man in the country. Their daughter Mette Rosenkrantz took over the estate after her mother's death in 1586. She had been married first to Steen Rosensparre and then to Peder Oxe but had become a widow for the second time with her second husband's death in 1575. This had left her the wealthiest woman in the country. After her death, in 1588, Totterupholm was endowed to her granddaughter, Jytte Gyldenstierne, who had been married first to Peder Juel of Gjorslev (died 1612) and then Christian Grubbe of Lystrup (died før 1642). Her son, Peder Grubbe, sold the estate to Edel Rosenkrantz in 1644. She married Knud Ulfeldt who was killed in the Scanian War in 1657.

Edel Rosenkrantz died in 1684. One of her daughters, Margrethe Ylfeldt, was married to admiral Niels Juel, who bought out the other hairs. Niels Juel died in 1797. The estate was then passed on to his son-in-law, Niels Krag. His widow, Sophie Krag (Niels Juel's daughter), then owned it until her death in 1731.

=== Barony of Rosenlund ===
Niels and Sophie Krag's eldest daughter, Anna Margretha Krag, the widow of Christian Pedersen Juel, married Holger Rosenkrantz in 1731. In 1748, Totterupholm was elevated to a barony under the name Rosenlund. The Barony of Rosenlund could, however, due to its relatively small size, not benefit from the Tax exemptions that normally applied for tenant farms under a barony. Rosenkrantz managed Rosenlund with great skill and increased the quarrying of limestone at Faxe. Prior to his death in 1785, Rosenkrantz had chosen his nephew Iver Rosenkrantz as his heir. He had also granted him permission to sell Rosenlund on condition that he would create a fideikommis for future generations of the family.

=== Rosendal, 1788–2000 ===
Iver Rosenkrantz sold Rosenlund to Haagen Christian Astrup in 1788 on the condition that its name would be changed back to Totterupholm. Haagen Christian Astrup was, however, a few months later, granted permission instead to rename it Rosendal. In 1801, Astrup sold Rosendal to Lauridz Moss Hofgaard and Carl Adolph Stampe. In 1803, he sold it to Lauridz Moss Hofgaard.

Christian Conrad, Count of Danneskiold-Samsøe acquired the estate in 1806. His widow, Henriette Danneskiold-Samsøe kept the estate after her husband's death.Jess Wilhelm Ferdinand Rauert(1809–1882) leased the estate from 1850 to 1860.

In 1938, Danneskiold-Samsøe sold Rosendal to her son-in-law Gustav Christian Holck-Winterfeldt in 1837. He constructed a new main building in 1847–49. Holck-Winterfeldt died on the estate on 22 November 1885. Rosendal was then taken over by his son, Flemming Holck-Winterfeldt. He left Rosendal to his nephew, Helge Ernest Knuth, who had already managed it for his uncle for some time. He modernized the operations. Helge Ernest Knuth died unmarried and without children in 1941. Rosendal was therefore passed on to his brother Flemming Knuth but he already died the following year. He left Rosendal to his nephew, Kjeld Gustav Knuth-Winterfeldt, who ceded it to his son Ditlev Helge Knuth-Winterfeldt in 1980.

== Architecture ==
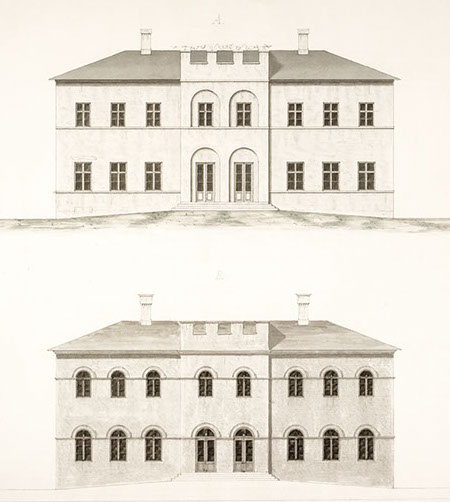
Rosendal, architectural rendering] of the main building

Michael Gottlieb Bindesbøll's main building is a two-storey building constructed in local limestone. The building is eight bays wide and has a slightly projecting median risalit. It is topped by a hip roof with four chimneys. The main building is flanked by two one-storey, half-timbered side wings with red tile roofs that date from the 17th century. The eastern side wing is the former kitchen wing. The western side wing was used for the administration. To the south of the main wing is a large garden.

The three wings surround an open courtyard. To the north of the complex is a three-winged home farm (avlsgård). The estate manager's house (forpagterboligen) is located to the east of the main building.

== Today ==
Rosendal was acquired by Hong Kong–based Danish businessman Hans Michael Jebsen in 2000. It is now owned by his eldest son Michael Immanuel Jebsen through the company Rosendal A/S. The estate has a total area of 438 hectares (1,080 acres) of which 280 hectares (690 acres) hectares are farmland, 130 hectares (320 acres) hectares are farmland and 10 hectares (25 acres) hectares are pastures.

== List of owners ==
- (1554–1586) Ide Munk, gift Rosenkrantz
- (1586–1588) Mette Rosenkrantz, gift 1) Rosensparre, 2) Oxe
- (1588–1642) Jytte Gyldenstierne, gift 1) Juel, 2) Grubbe
- ( -1612) Peder Juel
- (1612- ) Jytte Gyldenstierne, gift 1) Juel, 2) Grubbe
- ( –1642) Christian Grubbe
- ( -1642) Jytte Gyldenstierne, gift 1) Juel, 2) Grubbe
- (1642–1644) Peder Grubbe
- (1644–1646) Edel Rosenkrantz, gift 1) Laxmand, 2) Ulfeldt
- (1646–1657) Knud Ulfeldt
- (1657–1684) Edel Rosenkrantz, gift 1) Laxmand, 2) Ulfeldt
- (1684) Pernille Rosenkrantz
- (1684–1686) Edel Rosenkrantz' niecer
- (1684–1697) Niels Juel
- (1697–1712) Niels Krag
- (1712–1722) Sophie Juel, gift Krag
- (1722–1731) Anna Margrethe Krag, gift Juel
- (1731–1785) Holger Rosenkrantz
- (1785–1788) Iver Rosenkrantz
- (1788–1801) Haagen Christian Astrup
- (1801–1803) Carl Adolph Stampe
- (1801–1806) Lauritz Moss Hofgaard
- (1806–1823) Christian Conrad, Count of Danneskiold-Samsøe
- (1823–1837) Johanne Henriette Valentine Danneskiold-Samsøe, née Kaas
- (1837–1886) Gustav Holck-Winterfeldt
- (1886–1930) Flemming Holck-Winterfeldt
- (1930–1941) Helge Knuth
- (1941–1942) Flemming Knuth
- (1942–1980) Kield Gustav Knuth-Winterfeldt
- (1972–2000) Ditlev Helge Knuth-Winterfeldt
- (2000– ) Hans Michael Jebsen
- ( – present) Michael Immanuel Jebsen
