= Hans Michael Jebsen =

Hong Kong-based Danish businessman and landowner

Hans Michael Jebsen (Chinese: 捷成漢; born 15 November 1956) is a Hong Kong–based Danish businessman and landowner.

== Early life and education ==
Jebsen was born on 15 November 1956 in Siegen, Germany. The Jebsen family is of German-Danish origin and he attended the Deutsches Gymnasium in Åbenrå before studying Economics and Business Administration at the University of St Gallen, Switzerland (1978–1981).

== Career ==
Jebsen has been the chairman of the Jebsen Group since 2000. He is non-executive director of Singapore-based Jebsen & Jessen (SEA). Pte Ltd. and Jebsen & Jessen Hamburg. He is an Independent Non-Executive Director of The Wharf (Holdings). Ltd. in Hong Kong.

== Property in Denmark ==
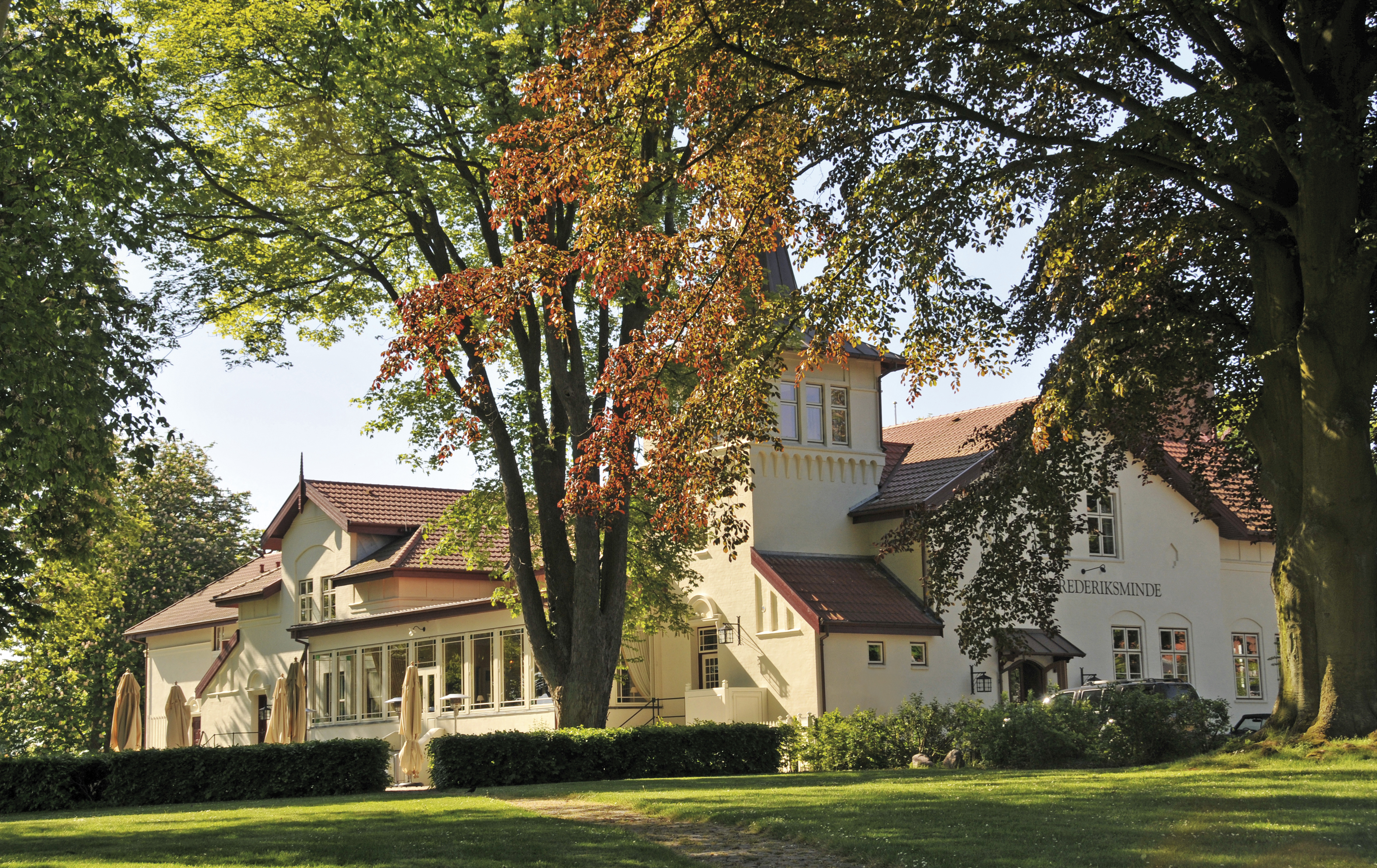
Hotel Frederiksminde

Jebsen owns a large portfolio of historic properties in Denmark via the company Stenbjerg Ejendomme. His holdings include Oreby Manor on Lolland. He has previously also owned Rosendal at Præstø and Nedergård and Charlottenlund on Langeland but Rosendal is now owned by his eldest son, Michael Immanuel Jebsen, while the estates on Langeland have been ceded to another son, Casper Jebsen. Michael Immanuel Jebsen acquired Bækkeskov by Tappernøje south of Copenhagen (previously owned by the late Peter Zobel) in 2018.

Jebsen is also the owner of a number of historic hotels and inns, including Hotel Frederiksminde and Rønnede kro on Zealand and Kalvø Badehotel, Årøsund Badehotel, Ballebro Færgekro, Dyvig Badehotel and Hotel Baltica in Sønderjylland. The restaurant of Hotel Frederiksminde holds one star in the Michelin Guide.

== Philanthropy ==
Hans Michael Jebsen is active in various organisations and NGOs. He is chairman of the Hong Kong Section at the Hong Kong – Europe Business Council, and serves on the HKUST Business School advisory board. Jebsen is also a member of the board of trustees of Asia Society Hong Kong, a trustee of the World Wide Fund for Nature (WWF) in Hong Kong, a member of the advisory board of Hong Kong Red Cross, founder member and executive council member at the Asian Academy of International Law.

== Awards ==
Jebsen was conferred the title of Guangzhou Honorary Citizen in 2021. He was bestowed the Danish title of “Kammerherre” by H.M. The Queen of Denmark in 2020. He was awarded the Blanchette Hooker Rockefeller Award in 2018, Knight 1st class of the Order of Dannebrog of Denmark in 2014, the Cross of Merit of the Federal Republic of Germany in 2009, the Silver Cross of the Order of Dannebrog of Denmark in 2006, and the Bronze Bauhinia Star of the Hong Kong SAR in 2001. of the Hong Kong SAR in 2001.

Since 2005, Jebsen has been an honorary citizen of Jilin City, China. In addition, he is an Honorary Fellow of the Hong Kong University of Science & Technology.

== Personal life ==
Jebsen is married to Desirée Jebsen, a former countess of Schaffgotsch. They have five children. Several of them have attended the Herlufsholm Boarding School in Denmark and featured in a Danish television documentary about the school. The family has close ties to the Danish royal family. He is a member of the Royal Danish Yacht Club and the Royal Copenhagen Shooting Society.
