= Royal Danish Agricultural Society =

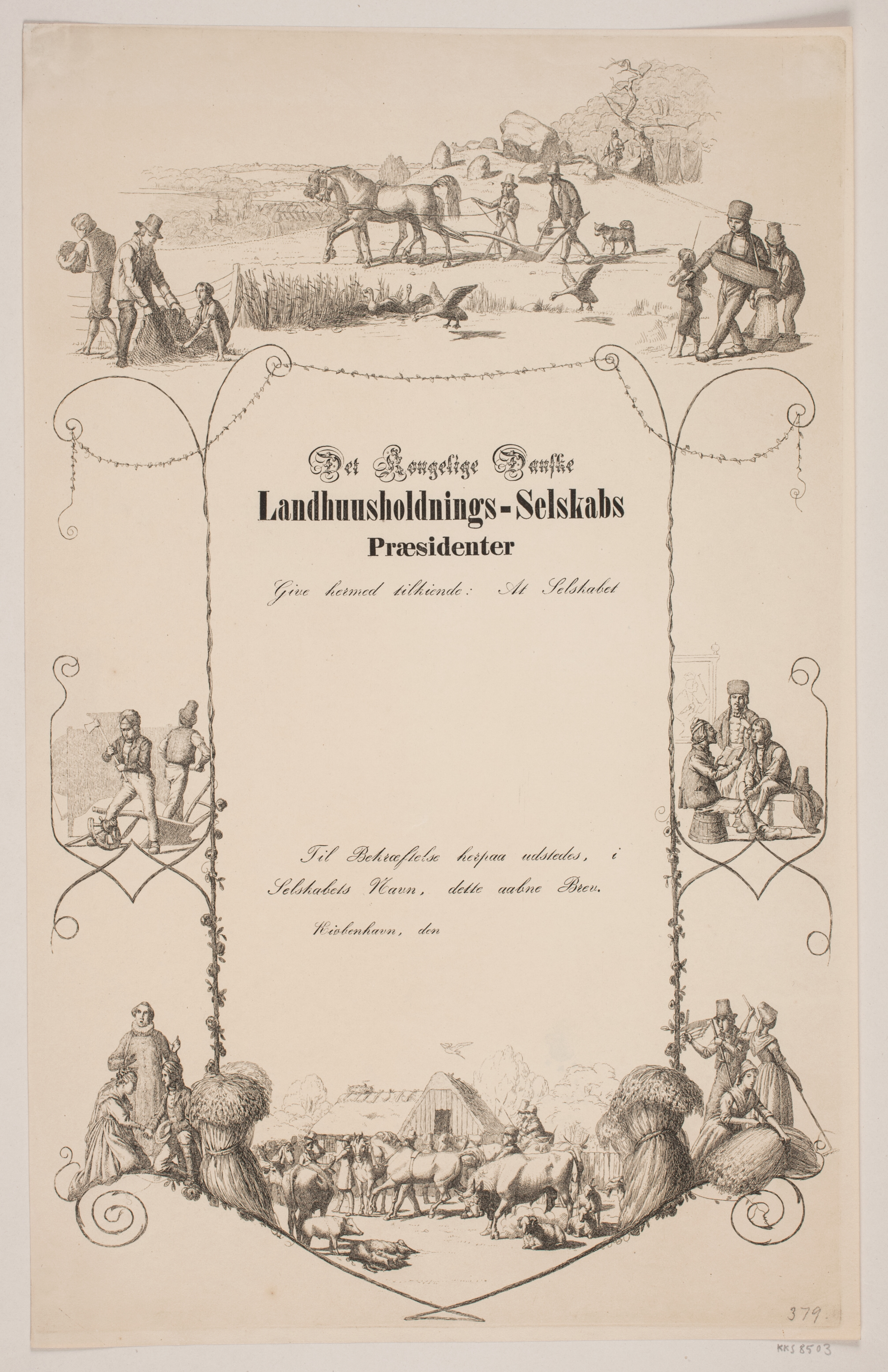
A diploma from the Royal Danish Agricultural Society designed by Jørgen V. Sonne in 1842

The Royal Danish Agricultural Society (Danish: Det Kongelige Danske Landhusholdningsselskab, DKHL) is a Danish Learned society dedicated to agricultural practices that was founded in 1769. Today, the society is promoted as a forum for discussions on agricultural practices, sustainable land use, and environmental issues related to agricultural production.

The society holds seminars and awards prizes for agricultural competitions. Since 1831, it has published the journal Tidsskrift for Landøkonomi.

== History ==
The Royal Danish Agricultural Society was established on 29 January 1769 through the initiative of Count Johann Hartwig Ernst von Bernstorff's protégé, Martin Hübner. The society was based on similar organizations in other European countries, including the Society for the Encouragement of Arts, Manufactures and Commerce, the Académie d'Agriculture, the Free Economic Society.

The society was established with the intention of promoting an interest in agriculture through competitions for farmers, craftsmen, artists, and agricultural theorists. From 1770 to 1832, the society primarily functioned to support these competitions and organize funding for prizes which were typically medals, which had been designed by Daniel Adzer, and monetary awards. The society would publish an annual list of prize categories which changed each year to reflect innovations that the society wished to fund. Initially, around 55 individual prizes were offered. The number of prizes on offer peaked in 1790 at 170, before reducing in 1832 to 3 theoretical and 12 practical prizes.

Beginning in 1804, prizes were only offered as trophy cups which could be exchanged for the value of their silver. The cups are made in several different sizes to represent different tiers, with the largest size only being granted on special occasions for achievements of particular merit in the field of agricultural education. By the 1970s, more than 900 silver cups had been awarded by the society.

== Presidents ==
Initially, the society's members were mainly farmers, clergy, and estate owners. Presidents were usually high-ranking civil servants. Previously, the society was led simultaneously several presidents, however today only one member holds the title of president at a time.

- 1769–1774: Ludvig Moltke
- 1769–1772: Johann Hartwig Ernst von Bernstorff
- 1773–1783: Thomas Bugge
- 1774–1778: Peter Christian Abildgaard
- 1774–1787: Henrik Gerner
- 1778–1781: Benjamin Georg Sporon
- 1779–1786: Joachim Michael Geuss
- 1782–1787: Vilhelm August Hansen
- 1784–1798: Ove Malling
- 1795–1797: Philip Rosenstand-Goiske
- 1798–1801: Ernst Frederik Walterstorff
- 1803–1806: Christen Henriksen Pram
- 1807–1808: Philip Rosenstand-Goiske (2nd term)
- 1809–1855: Jonas Collin
- 1817–1855: Anders Sandøe Ørsted
- 1819–1830: Johan Christian Drewsen
- 1831–1839: V.F. Johnsen
- 1840–1848: Iver Johan Unsgaard
- 1850–1855: Frederik Treschow
- 1855–1883: B.S. Jørgensen
- 1860–1888: Edward Tesdorpf
- 1866–1881: Ludvig Holstein-Holsteinborg
- 1881–1893: Christian Danneskiold-Samsøe
- 1883–1891: Niels Johannes Fjord
- 1888–1897: Carl Castenschiold
- 1889–1909: Knud Sehested
- 1891–1898: J.C. la Cour
- 1893–1894: Christian Lüttichau
- 1898–1900: Frederik Friis
- 1900–1902: Thomas Riise Segelcke
- 1902–1910: Frederik Friis (2nd term)
- 1909–1919: Carl Bech
- 1910–1920: Theodor Westermann
- 1911–1930: Frederik Christian Moltke
- 1919–1934: Christian Sonne
- 1934–1943: Karl Hasselbalch
- 1934–1955: O.H. Larsen
- 1941–1957: Axel Pedersen
- 1943–1952: August Bech
- 1956–1980: Edward Tesdorpf
- 1963–1976: Aksel Olufsen
- 1979–1994: Peter Skak Olufsen
- 1990–2005: Jon Krabbe
- 2005–present: Frederik Lüttichau
