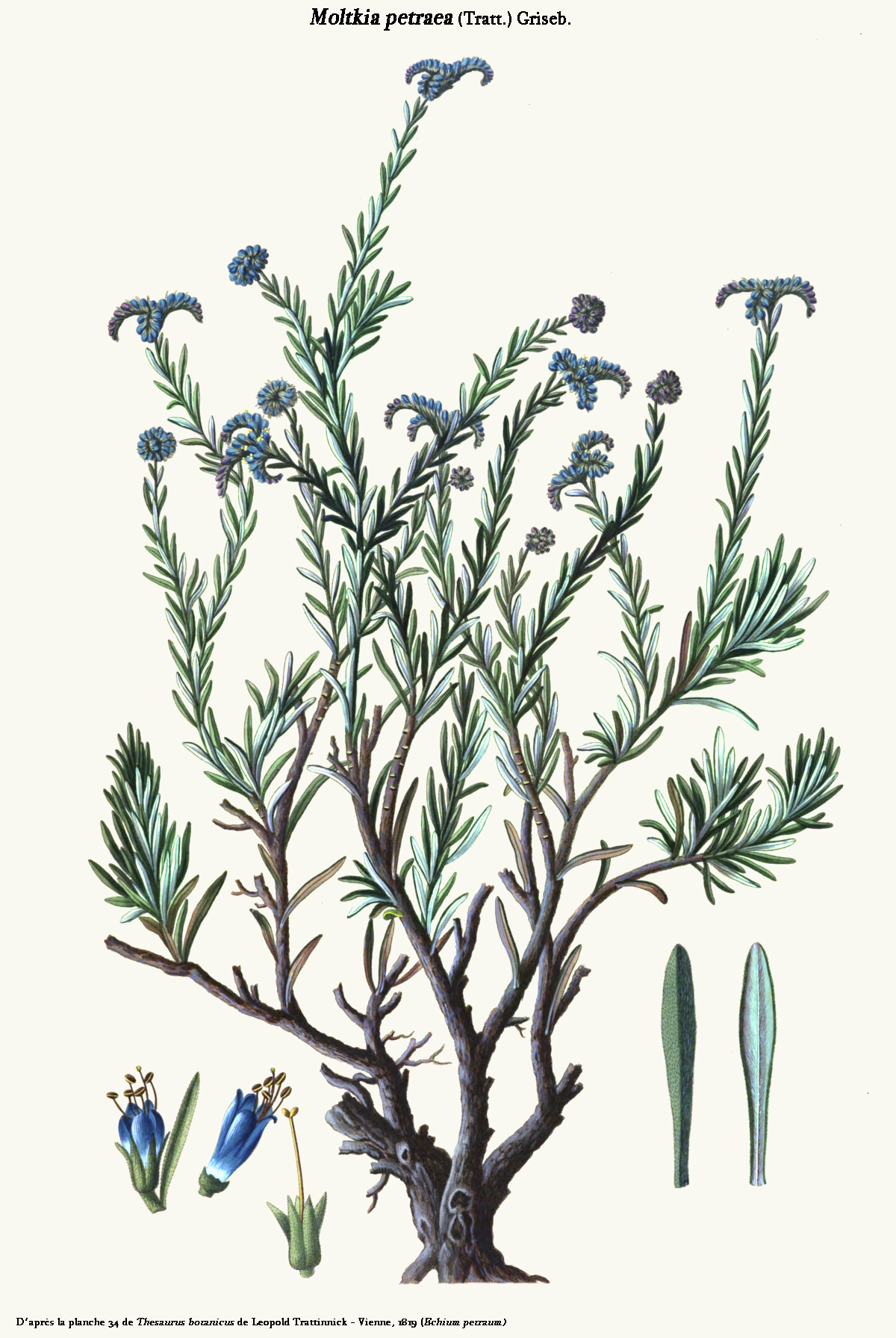

Scientific classification
- Kingdom: Plantae
- Clade: Embryophytes
- Clade: Tracheophytes
- Clade: Spermatophytes
- Clade: Angiosperms
- Clade: Eudicots
- Clade: Asterids
- Order: Boraginales
- Family: Boraginaceae
- Subfamily: Boraginoideae
- Genus: Moltkia; Lehm.

Species
- See text

Synonyms
- Gymnoleima Decne.

= Moltkia (plant) =

Genus of flowering plants in the borage family

Moltkia is a genus in the family Boraginaceae with 6 accepted species. They are herby semi-bushes (shrubs) with dark green hairy leaves and hanging groups of tube-shaped flowers. The species occur in the south of Europe and western Asia, where they are sparely hardy.

It is found in the regions of Albania, Greece, Iran, Iraq, Italy, Lebanon-Syria, Transcaucasus, Turkey and Yugoslavia.

The genus name of Moltkia is in honour of Joachim Godske Moltke (1746–1818), the Prime Minister of Denmark from 1814 to 1818. He was also father of Prime Minister Adam Wilhelm Moltke and the son of Danish diplomat Adam Gottlob Moltke. It was first described and published in Neue Schriften Naturf. Ges. Halle Vol.3 (Issue 2) on page 3 in 1817.

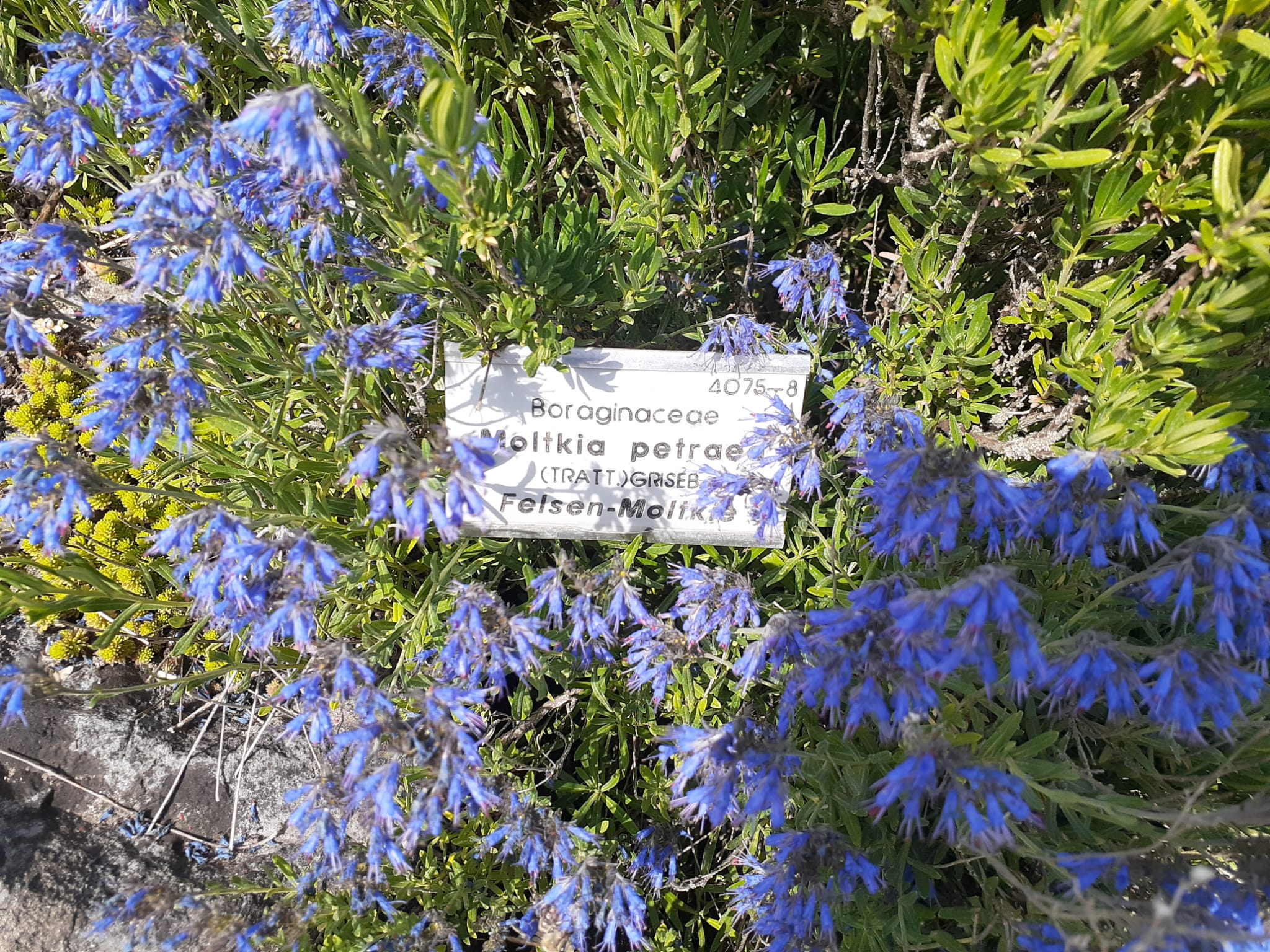
Moltkia petraea in Münster botanic gardens

Moltkia petraea, an evergreen shrub, bearing alternate hairy leaves and blooms Lilac/blue tube-shaped hanging flowers in small groups and is found in the South of Europe. The hybrid Moltkia intermedia is bred from a crossing of the 2 species Moltkia petraea and Moltkia suffruticosa and has blooms with dark blue hanging tube-shaped flowers in bunches.

== Species ==
- Moltkia angustifolia DC.
- Moltkia aurea Boiss.
- Moltkia coerulea (Willd.) Lehm.
- Moltkia gypsacea Rech.f. & Aellen
- Moltkia × intermedia (Froebel) J.W.Ingram
- Moltkia × kemal-paschii Bornm.
- Moltkia petraea (Tratt.) Griseb.
- Moltkia suffruticosa (L.) Brand
