= Frederik Georg Julius Moltke =

Danish landowner and politician

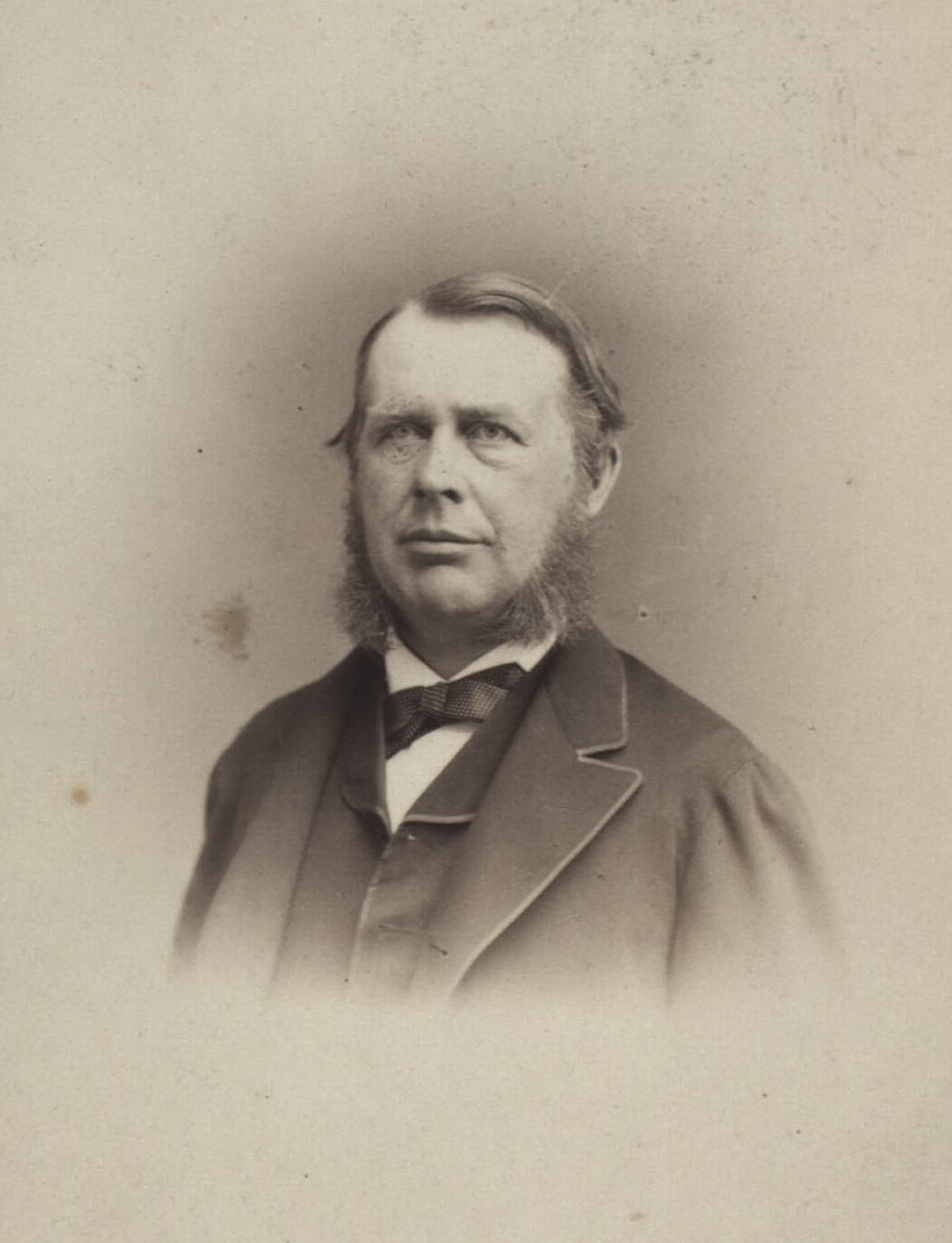
Frederik Georg Julius Moltke, by Niels Christian Hansen

Frederik Georg Julius Moltke (27 February 1825 – 1 October 1875), Count of Bregentved, was a Danish landowner and politician.

== Early life and career ==
Moltke was born in Copenhagen, the son of Adam Wilhelm Moltke (1785–1864) and Marie Elisabeth Knuth (1791–1851). He was the elder brother of Christian Moltke. He finished secondary school in 1842 and then studied law at the University of Copenhagen but never completed his exams.

Moltke began his career as a volunteer in the Ministry of Foreign Affairs in 1848. From 1850 to 1855, he was an attaché in London.

== Political career ==
Moltke was a member of Folketinget from 1855 to 1861 and of Landstinget from 1866 to 1875. He was a member of the privy council (rigsrådet) from 1864 to 1866. In the beginning of his political career he was associated with the National Liberal Party but later joined Højre. His name and holdings made him one of the leading representatives of the landowners and was considered to have government minister potential between 1868 and 1870. In 1874, he rejected the king's call to form a government after Ludvig Holstein-Holsteinborg. In June 1875, he was appointed Minister of Foreign Affairs in the Estrup Cabinet but had at this point already fallen ill; he died a few months later.

== Property ==
Moltke succeeded his father as the owner of Bregentved, Turebyholm and Sofiedal in 1864. His city home in Copenhagen was Moltke's Mansion in Frederiksstaden.

He was the curator of Vallø and Vemmetofte from 1864.

== Personal life ==
Moltke married Caroline van der Maase (23 July 1827 – 26 September 1886), daughter of chamberlain Frederik Herman Rostgaard van der Maase of Krogerup (1800–1866) and Maren Olivia Colbiørnsen (1795–1877), on 6 June 1851 in Christiansborg Chapel. The couple had the following children:

- Frederik Christian Moltke (20 August 1854 – 23 September 1936)
- Adam Wilhelm Moltke (30 March 1852 –10 October 1860)
- Joachim Ludvig Moltke (10 February 1857 – 29 December 1943)
- Hemming Vilhelm Moltke (12 September 1861 – 8 November 1927)

He died at Bregentved on 1 October 1875 and is buried in the chapel at Karise Church.

== Awards ==
Moltke was appointed chamberlain in 1851. He was made a Knight in the Order of the Dannebrog in 1856 and was awarded the Grand Cross in 1873.
