= Anne Hardenberg =

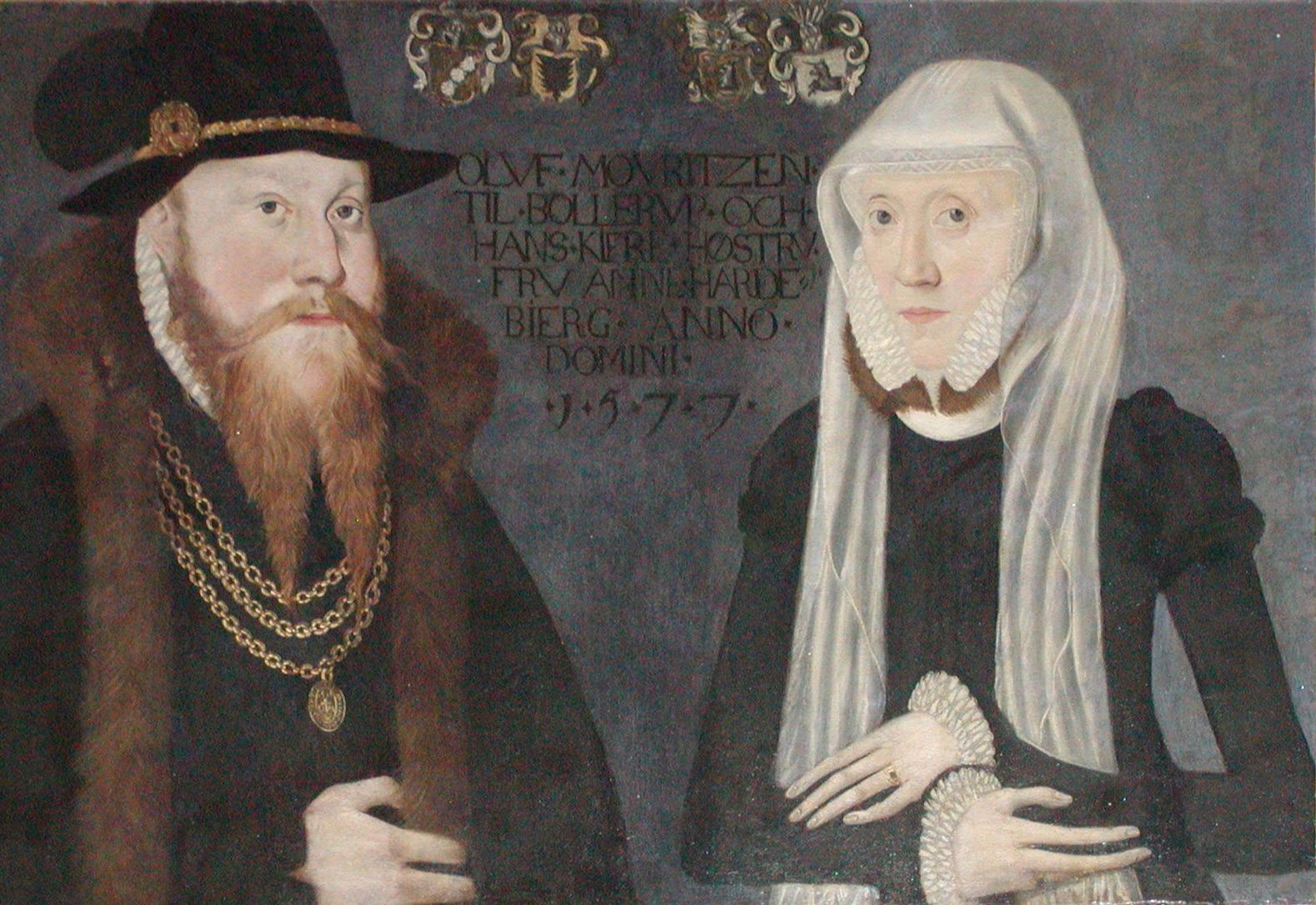
Anne of Hardenberg in 1577 with her husband, Oluf Krognos

Anne Corfitzdatter of Hardenberg (or Anne Corfitzdatter Hardenberg, died 1588) was a Danish courtier. She served as a lady-in-waiting to the Dowager Queen Dorothea of Denmark from 1559 to 1572 and is known to have been the love interest of Frederick II, who famously wished to marry her.

== Biography ==
Of high nobility, Anne was the daughter of Corfitz Eriksen of Hardenberg and Mette Christiernsdatter Skram. She was introduced at court, where she was named hofdame (maid-of-honor) to queen Dorothea in 1559.

Anne first got to know Frederick II, Queen Dorothea's eldest son, when he was a Crown Prince. He fell in love with her and wanted to marry her. However, a marriage was already planned between her and Oluf Mouritsen Krognos, (1535–1573) Chancellor of the Realm (rigsråd, in Danish). When Frederick assumed the throne of Denmark in 1559 at the age of 25, he attempted once more to marry Anne. Frederick's desire to marry a non-royal was met with widespread opposition. The nobility and the king's advisors believed it an imprudent match, as it might incite jealousy and accusations of favoritism among relatives and other court families. It is not known how Anne Hardenberg herself felt about the king, but she, too, advised Frederick against the marriage. Anne Hardeberg was never a mistress of the king, as they are not known to ever have had intercourse.

Finally, in 1571, at age 37 the king relented and was betrothed instead to his 14-year-old first half-cousin Sophie of Mecklenburg-Güstrow. He apparently wished for his first love to approve of the match before going through with the betrothal, as he organized a meeting between himself, his future mother-in-law, the Duchess Elizabeth, and Anne. After the meeting, Anne wrote to her close friend, Birgitte Gøye, "God knows I am so happy and calm in my heart as I have not been in many years."

Shortly after the royal marriage, Anne of Hardenberg married her old suitor, Oluf Krognos. They were married on 11 January 1573 in Church of Our Lady (Vor Frue Kirke) in Copenhagen. Unfortunately, he died six months after the wedding on 25 June 1573. She lived at her dowry, the Bregentved Estate outside Haslev in Zealand. Anne managed to keep her husband's family's financial support with the assistance of the royal family, especially the king's sister, Anna, Electress of Saxony.
