= Joachim Godske Moltke =

Danish politician (1746–1818)

Joachim Godske von Moltke
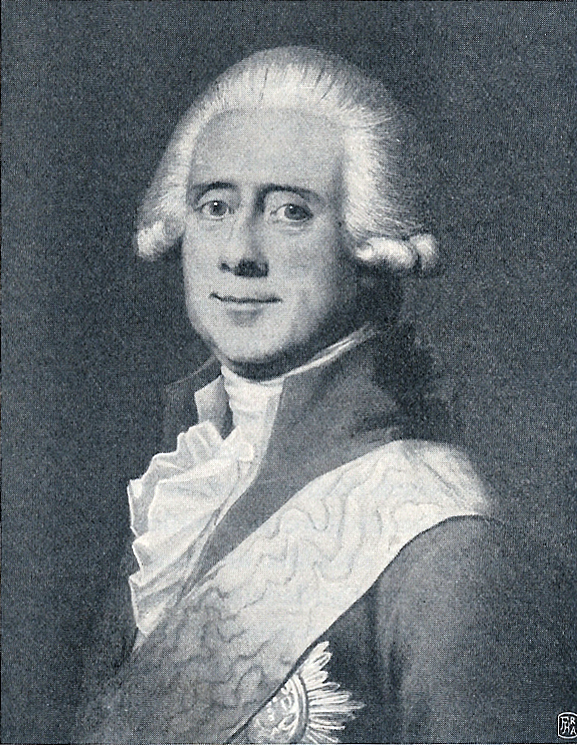

Prime minister of Denmark
- Predecessor: Frederik Julius Kaas
- Successor: Ernst Heinrich von Schimmelmann
- Born: 25 July 1746; Marienborg Manor, Møn
- Died: 5 October 1818 (aged 72)
- Spouse: Georgine von Buchwald
- Issue: Adam Wilhelm Moltke
- Father: Adam Gottlob Moltke
- Mother: Christiane Frederikke von Brüggemann

Joachim Godske von Moltke (25 July 1746 – 5 October 1818) was the Prime Minister of Denmark from 1814 to 1818. He was also father of Prime Minister Adam Wilhelm Moltke and the son of Danish diplomat Adam Gottlob Moltke.

== Early life ==
Joachim Godske Moltke was born on 25 July 1746. He was the son of Danish diplomat Adam Gottlob Moltke (1710–1792), the influential Lord Steward and companion of Frederick V of Denmark, and Christiane Frederikke von Brüggemann (1712–1760), the daughter of Godske Hans von Brügmann, til Østergaard og Ulriksholm and Margrethe Wilhelmine von Hausmann. Between his two wives, his father was said to have had 22 sons, five of whom became cabinet ministers, four who became ambassadors, two who became generals, and all of whom went into public service.

== Career ==
Moltke served as Prime Minister of Denmark from 1814 until 14 August 1818.

== Personal life ==
Moltke was married to Georgine von Buchwald (1759–1808), the daughter of Caspar von Buchwald and Sophie Charlotte von Hahn. They were the parents of: Adam Wilhelm Moltke (1785–1864).

Moltke died on 5 October 1818.

== Honours ==
In 1817, botanist Johann Georg Christian Lehmann published Moltkia, a genus in the family Boraginaceae with 6 accepted species from the south of Europe and western Asia. Then in 1953, botanist I.M.Johnst. published Moltkiopsis, a monotypic genus of flowering plants from northern Africa and the Arabian Peninsula, belonging to the family Boraginaceae. Both plants were dedicated after Joachim Godske Moltke.

Political offices
Preceded by Fredrik Julius Kaas	Privy Councillor of Denmark; 1814 - 1818	Succeeded by Ernst Heinrich von Schimmelmann
