= Bregentved =

Danish manor house

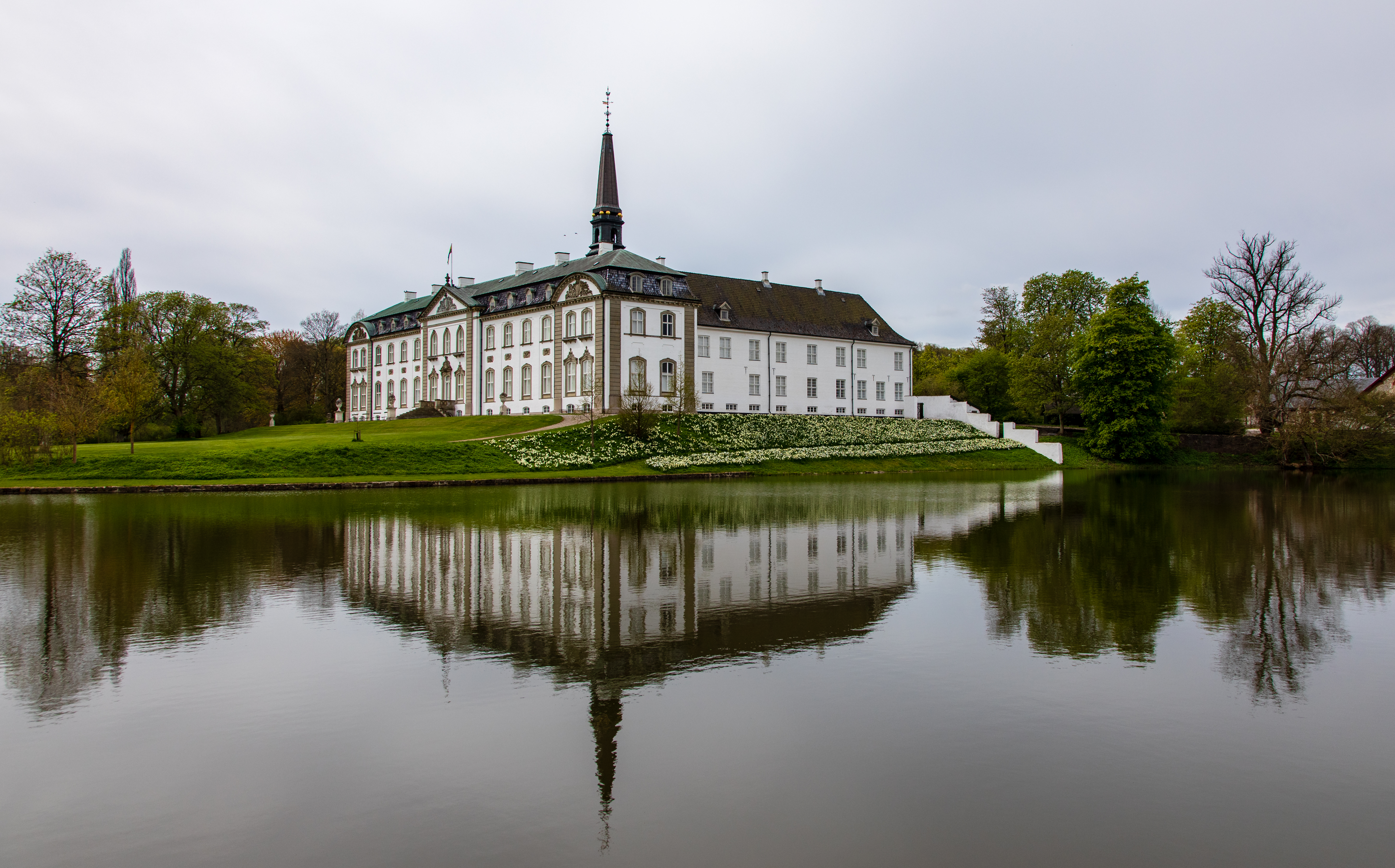
- Bregentved: The eastern main wing to the left and the older north wing to the right

General information
- Architectural style: Neo-Rococo
- Location: Faxe Municipality, Denmark
- Coordinates: 55.3074°N 12.0070°E
- Completed: 1891

Design and construction
- Architect: Axel Berg

Bregentved is a manor house located 3 km east of Haslev on the Danish island of Zealand. It has been owned by the Moltke family since the middle of the 18th century.

== History ==
=== Early history ===
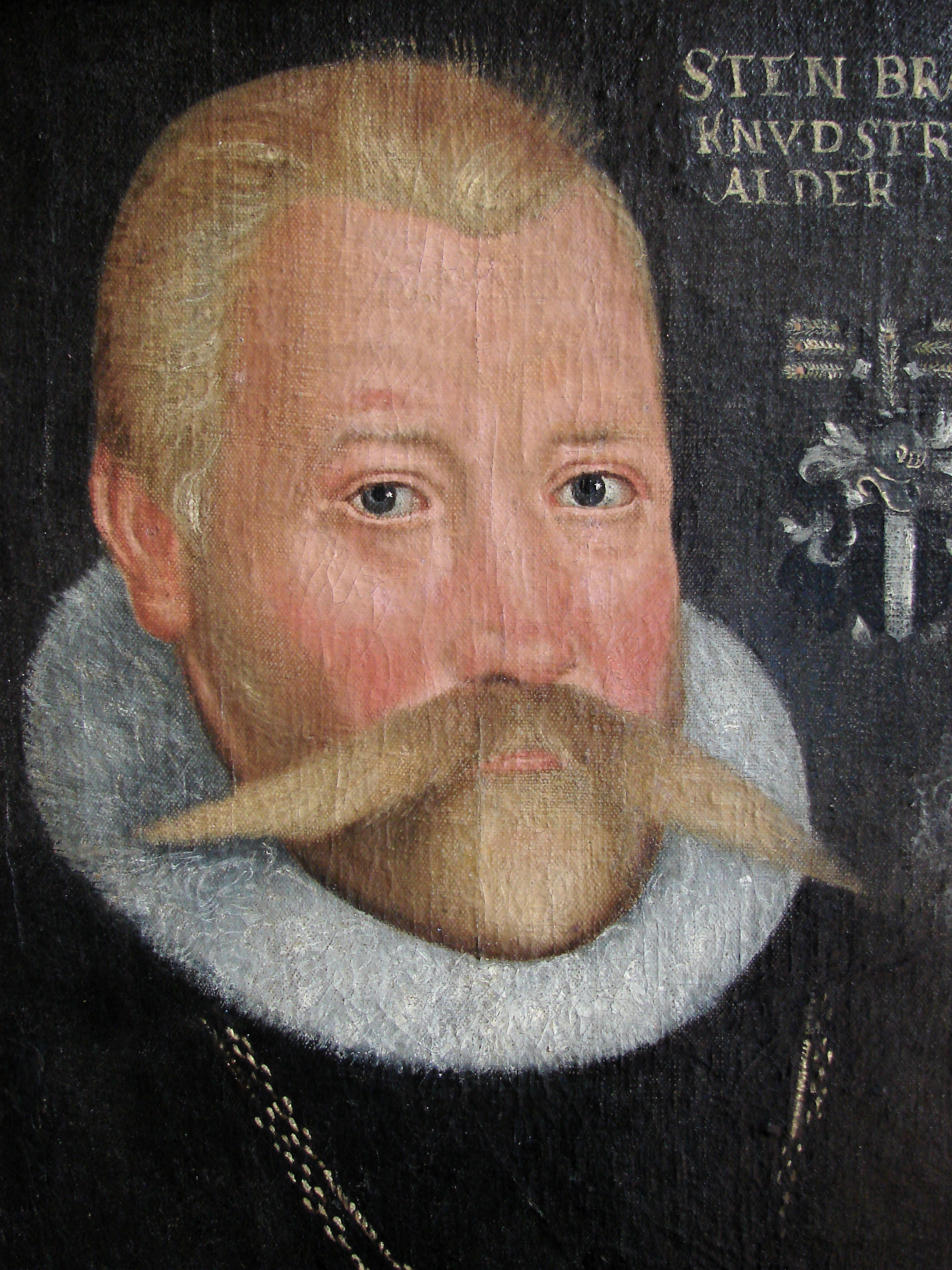
Steen Brahe, who owned Bregentved from 1581 to 1630

The first known reference to Bregentved is from 1319 when King Eric VI of Denmark passed the estate to Roskilde Abbey. From the end of the 14th century the property was owned by a succession of aristocratic families, including that of Krognos in the 16th century, until 1718 when it was acquired by King Frederick IV. In the eighteenth century Bregentved was in consecutive Birks, so had separate legal jurisdiction from Haslev Sogn (parish) and old Ringsted Herred (hundred). The north wing still extant in the early 21st century was built 1731-36 by architect Lauritz de Thurah and has a black-tiled, hipped roof. It contains a chapel on the first floor.

=== Moltke era ===
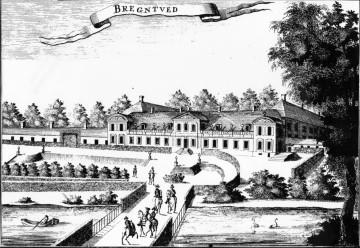
Eigtved's Bregentved in 1845

In 1746, King Frederick V granted the Bregentved estate to Adam Gottlob Moltke, one of his closest companions who was at the same time made lord chamberlain and a count. Over the next few years, Moltke adapted the two remaining wings with the assistance of the architects G.D. Anthon and Nicolai Eigtved. Moltke also commissioned Eigtved to build him a large mansion in Copenhagen, the south-western of the four Amalienborg Palaces, which was completed in 1754.

At Bregentved, Moltke introduced several agricultural reforms to the management of the estate with inspiration from Holstein.

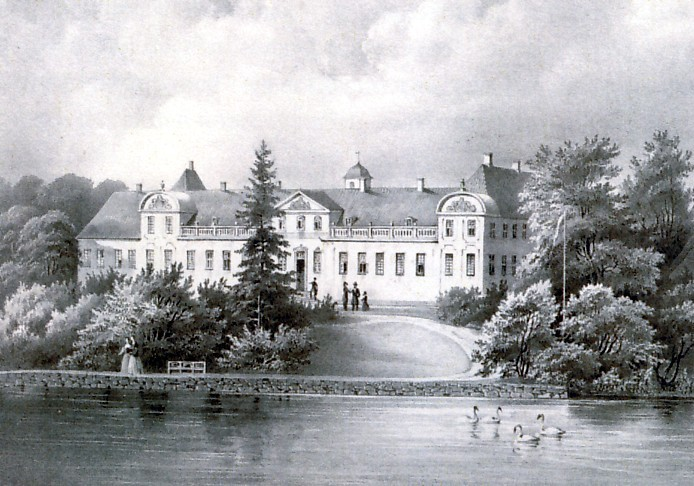
Eigtved's Bregentved in 1845

A. G. Moltke died at Bregentved on 25 September 1792, passing his estates to his oldest son, Joachim Godske Moltke, who ceded their mansion in Copenhagen to the royal family after the fire of Christiansborg Palace in 1794. As a replacement, Adam Wilhelm Moltke, who had just left office as the first Prime Minister under Denmark's new constitutional monarchy, acquired a new mansion which became known as Moltke's Mansion. After the harvests at Bregentved Manor and other family holdings, he would move his entire household to Copenhagen.

In the 1880s, Count Frederik Christian Moltke decided to modernize the house. He demolished the two Eigtved wings and replaced them with two new wings which were completed in 1891 to the design of the architect Axel Berg.

== Architecture ==
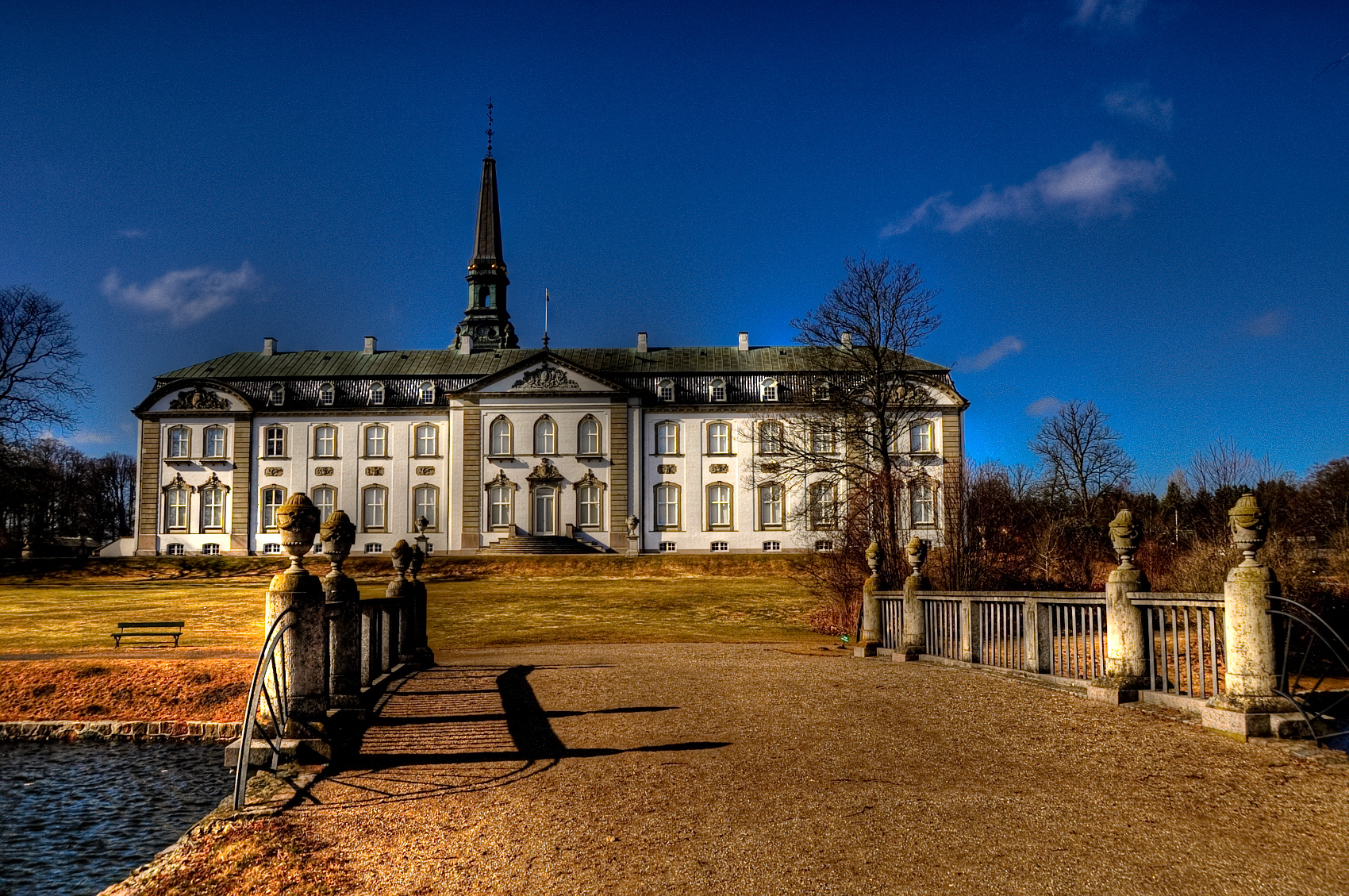
The main wing

The main east wing and the south wing of the present three-winged building date from Axel Berg's 1891 rebuilding and stand on Eigtved's foundations. They are designed in the Neo-Rococo style and are topped by a Mansard roof in copper and tile. The east wing has a three-bay risalit with pilasters and a triangular pediment, and a two-bay corner risilit at each end with segmental pediments. The entrance tower also dates from Berg's expansion.

The north wing was built 1731-36 by Lauritz de Thurah and has a black-tiled, hipped roof. It contains a chapel on the first floor which has sculptor Johann Friedrich Hännel.

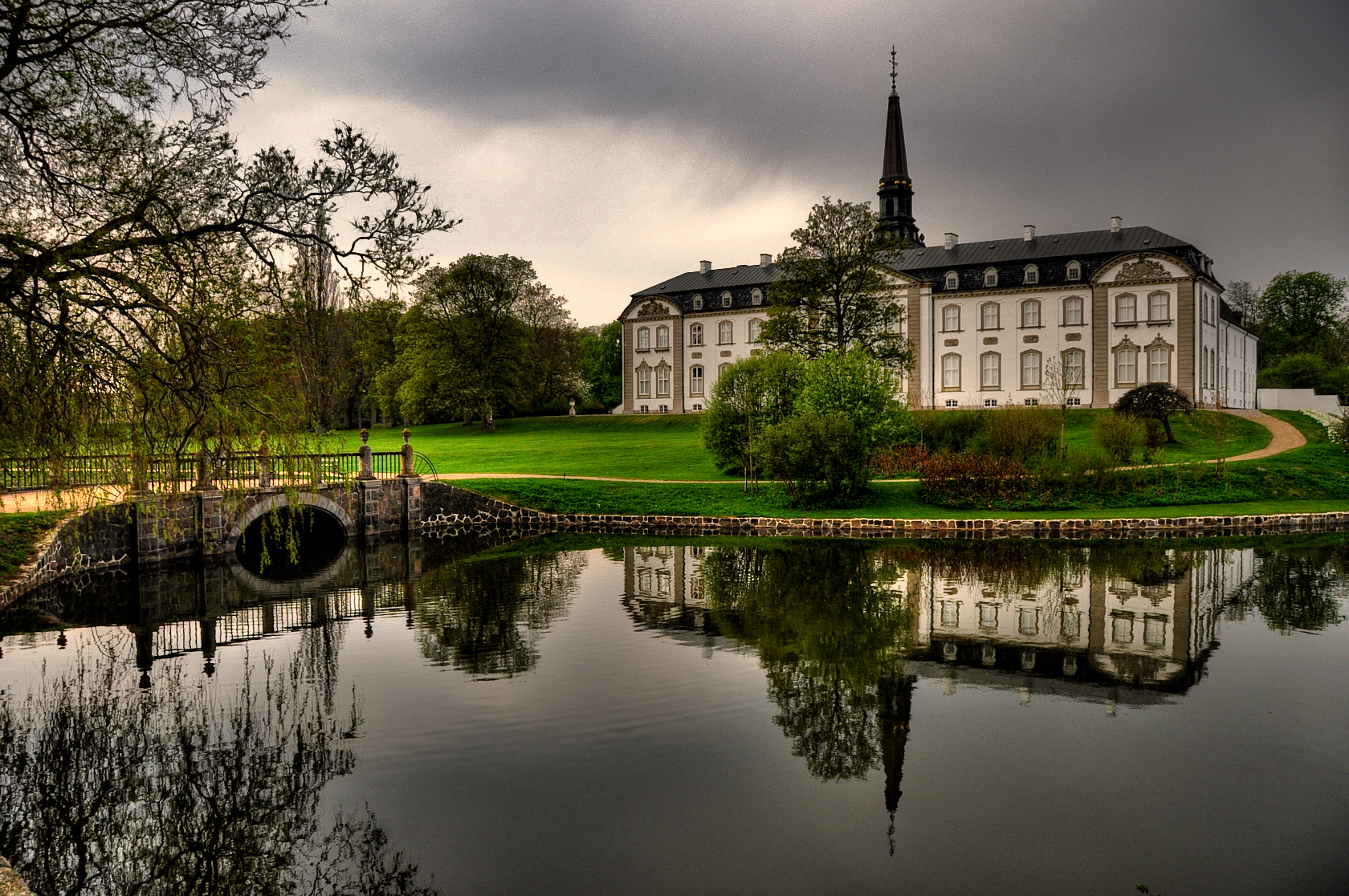
Bregentved House and Park

== Gardens ==
In the 1760s, A. G. Moltke commissioned Nicolas-Henri Jardin to create a garden in the French formal garden style but it was adapted into a landscape garden in 1835. Some features have been retained from Jardin's garden, including avenues, and traces of a parterre surrounded by canals and a system of fountains, which was restored in 1994. Some vases and Frederik V's Obelisk (1770) by Johannes Wiedewelt also date from this garden as does a copy of a statue by Giambologna. The garden also features a statue of A. W. Moltke by Herman Wilhelm Bissen in 1858-59.

== Bregentved today ==
Bregentved-Turebyholm covers 6,338 hectares of which just over half consist of agricultural land and the rest of forest. A total of 163 houses also belongs to the estate, including Turebylille, Holtegård, Eskilstrup, Rødehus, Sofiendal, Sprettingegård, Storelinde Overdrevsgård, Ulsegård and Statafgård. The estate maintains a staff of 40 and has a yearly turnover of approximately DKK 60 million. Apart from agriculture and forestry, the revenues derive from house rental, hiring-out of hunting areas, hiring-out of storage facilities and machine pool services.

There is no public access to the house but the park is open to the public on Wednesdays, Saturdays, Sundays and public holidays. Admission is free of charge.

== List of owners ==
- ( -1319) The Crown
- (1319- ) Ringsted Abbey
- ( -1364) Hesso Hvittensee
- ( -1364) Karl Nielsen
- (1364-1382) St. Clare's Priory, Roskilde
- (1382- ) Oluf Grubbe
- ( - ) Margrethe, gift (1) Grubbe (2) Bydelsbak
- ( -1414) Erik Bydelsbak
- (1414-1433) Laurids Eriksen Bydelsbak
- (1433-1456) Niels Pedersen Gyldenstjerne
- (1456-1504) Mourits Nielsen Gyldenstjerne
- (1504-1506) Oluf Stigsen Krognos
- (1506- ) Anne Mouritsdatter Gyldenstjerne, gift 1) Krognos, 2) * Podebusk
- ( -1541) Predbjørn Podebusk
- (1541-1545) Anne Mouritsdatter Gyldenstjerne, gift 1) Krognos, 2) Podebusk
- ( - ) Anders Bentsen Bille
- ( - ) Bent Andersen Bille
- (1545-1550) da:Mourits Olufsen Krognos
- (1550-1563) Eline Gøye, gift Krognos
- (1563-1573) Oluf Mouritsen Krognos
- (1573-1575) Anna Hardenberg
- (1575-1581) Christoffer Gøye
- (1581-1630) Steen Brahe
- (1630) Erik Steensen Brahe
- (1630) Falk Gøye
- (1630-1658) Frederik Knudsen Urne
- (1658-1668) Karen Hansdatter Urne, née Arentfeldt
- (1668-1682) Ove Juul
- (1682-1709) Frederik Gabel
- (1709-1718) Christian Carl Gabel
- (1718-1731) The Crown
- (1731-1740) Poul Vendelbo Løvenørn
- (1740) Frederik Poulsen de Løvenørn
- (1740-1746) The Crown
- (1746-1792) Adam Gottlob Moltke
- (1792-1818) Joachim Godske Moltke
- (1818-1864) Adam Wilhelm Moltke
- (1864-1875) Frederik Georg Julius Moltke
- (1875-1936) Frederik Christian Moltke
- (1936-1968) Christian Frederik Gustav Moltke
- (1968-1995) Hans Hemming Joachim Christian Moltke
- (1995-2017) Christian Georg Peter Moltke
- (2017-2019) Frederik Christian Adam Moltke / Christian Georg Peter Moltke
- (2019-) Christian Georg Peter Moltke

== See also ==
- List of Baroque residences
