= Adam Gottlob Moltke =

Danish courtier and statesman

Adam Gottlob von Moltke
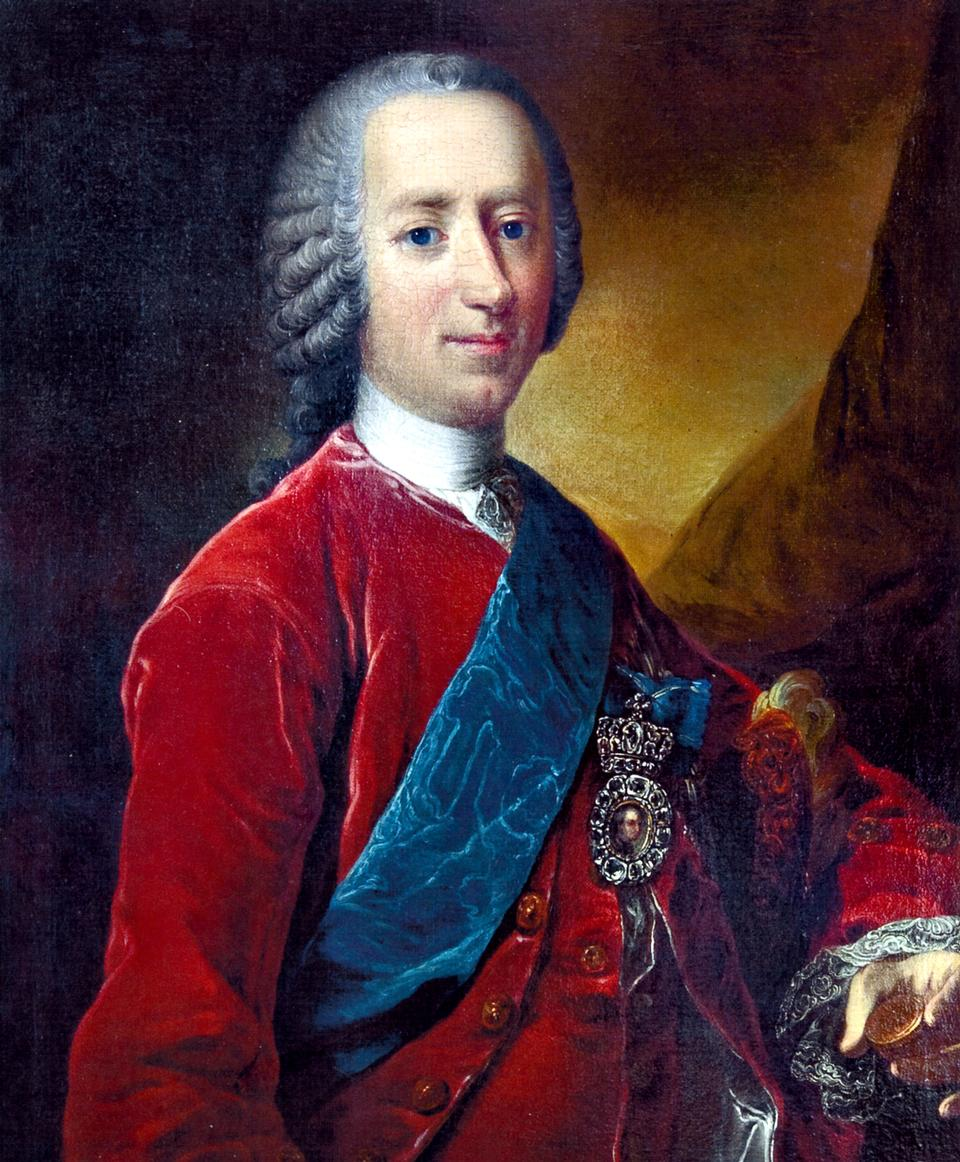
- Portrait of Moltke

Member of the Privy Council of Denmark
- In office 1747–1766

Court Marshal of Denmark
- In office 1743–1747

Lord Chamberlain of Denmark
- In office 1730–1743

Personal details
- Born: 10 November 1710 Riesenhof, Mecklenburg, Germany
- Died: 25 September 1792 (aged 81) Haslev, Sjælland, Denmark
- Spouse(s): Christiane Frederikke von Brüggemann; Sophie Hedevig von Raben
- Children: Joachim Godske Moltke; Ulrikke Augusta Vilhelmine Moltke
- Relatives: Adam Wilhelm Moltke (grandson)
- Awards: Ordre de l'Union Parfaite; Fellow of the Royal Society

Count Adam Gottlob von Moltke (10 November 1710 – 25 September 1792) was a German-born Danish courtier, politician and diplomat who was a favourite of Frederick V of Denmark-Norway. Moltke was born at Riesenhof in Mecklenburg. His son, Joachim Godske Moltke, and his grandson, Adam Wilhelm Moltke, later served as Prime Minister of Denmark.

== Early life ==
Adam Gottlob Greve von Moltke was born 10/11 November 1710 to Joachim von Moltke and Magdalene Sophia von Cothmann. Though of German origin, many of the Moltkes were at this time in the Danish-Norwegian service, which was considered a more important and promising opening for the young north German noblemen than the service of any of the native principalities.

== Career ==
In 1722, through one of his uncles, young Moltke became a page at the Danish court, in which capacity he formed a lifelong friendship with the crown prince Frederick, later King Frederick V.

=== Reign of Frederick V ===
In 1730, immediately after his accession, Frederick made Moltke Lord Chamberlain and showered him with honours: He was made a privy councillor, was granted the estate of Bregentved in 1747 and created him a count in 1750.

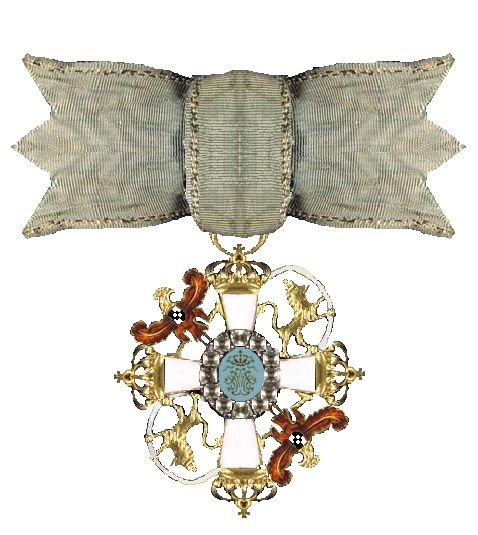
Ordre de l'Union Parfaite

As the companion of the king, Moltke's influence grew to the point that foreign diplomatists declared he could make and unmake ministers at will. Especially notable is Moltke's attitude towards the two distinguished statesmen who played the leading parts during the reign of Frederick, Johan Sigismund Schulin and The Elder Bernstorff. Schulin he revered, but Bernstorff irritated him with his affected airs of superiority. But though a Prussian intrigue was set up for the supersession of Bernstorff by Moltke, the latter, convinced that Bernstorff was the right man in the right place, supported him with unswerving loyalty.

Count Moltke's appointment as Lord Chamberlain, an office that had previously been a mere court post, was now an outstanding position that gave Moltke opportunity as the king's confidential friend to be around him from morning till night, with the king talking to him about whatever was on his mind, which enabled Moltke to make his influence felt in all areas where he pleased. One of his main tasks involved restraining the dissolute nature of His Majesty from damaging the Royal household's reputation with his constant orgies.

Moltke was less liberal in his views than many of his contemporaries. He looked askance at all projects for the emancipation of the serfs, but, as one of the largest landowners of Denmark, he did service to agriculture by lightening the burdens of the countrymen and introducing technical and scientific improvements, which also increased production. His greatest merit, however, was the guardianship he exercised over the king.

On the death of Queen Louisa, the king would have married one of Moltke's daughters had he not peremptorily declined the dangerous honour. Moltke then arranged a new marriage for the king to Duchess Juliana Maria of Brunswick-Wolfenbüttel, daughter of Ferdinand Albert II, Duke of Brunswick-Lüneburg and sister-in-law to Frederick the Great of Prussia. The marriage took place at Frederiksborg Palace on 8 July 1752.

=== Reign of Christian VII ===
On the death of Frederick, who died in his arms on 14 January 1766, Moltke's influence came to an end. The new king, Frederick's son, Christian VII, could not endure him, and exclaimed, with reference to his lanky figure: "He's stork below and fox above". At that time Moltke was also unpopular, because he was, wrongly, suspected of enriching himself from the public purse. Therefore, in July 1766, Moltke was dismissed from all his positions and retired to his estate at Bregentved.

On 8 February 1768, through the interest of Russia, to whom he had always been sympathetic, he regained his seat in the council, but his renewed influence was to be brief. As Christian VII's reign was marked by mental illness, he was heavily influenced by his personal physician Johann Friedrich Struensee. Struensee had risen steadily in power and from 1770 to 1772, was de facto regent of the country.

On 10 December 1770, Moltke was again dismissed without a pension for refusing to have anything to do with the liberal Struensee. In short order, Struensee issued no fewer than 1,069 cabinet orders abolishing torture, unfree labour (corvée), censorship of the press, noble privileges, etiquette rules at the Danish royal court. In addition, he instituted criminalisation and punishment of bribery, university reforms, assignment of farmland to peasants, and re-organization and reduction of the army After losing support of the people, partially as a result of his abolition of censorship of the press, Struensee was deposed by a coup in 1772, after which the country was ruled by the King's stepmother, Juliane Marie of Brunswick-Wolfenbüttel, his half-brother Frederick and the Danish politician Ove Høegh-Guldberg.

== Personal life ==
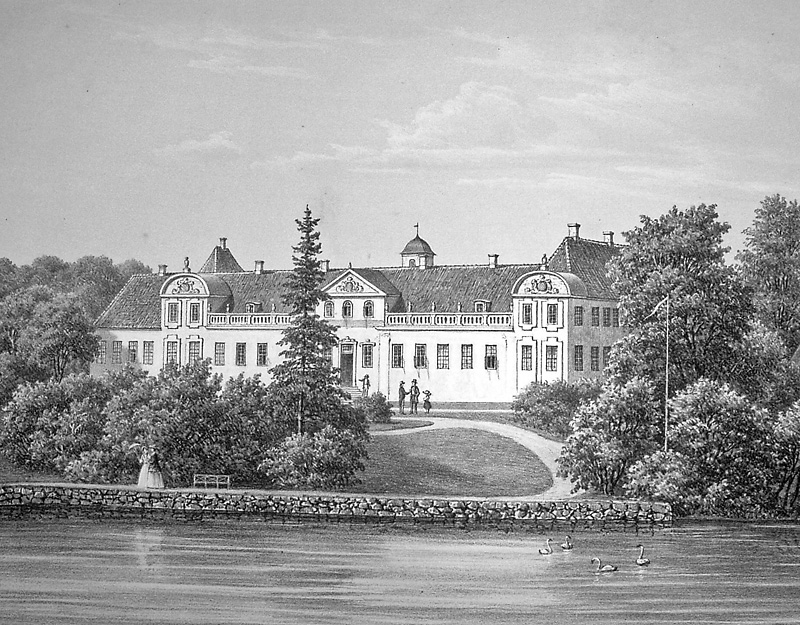
Moltke's estate, Bregentved

He was married to Christiane Frederikke von Brüggemann (1712–1760). After her death, he married Sophie Hedevig von Raben (1732–1802), the daughter of Christian Frederik von Raben, the Gouverneur (or Bishop) of the Diocese of Lolland–Falster from 1737 to 1763. Between his two wives, Moltke was said to have had 22 sons, five of whom became cabinet ministers, four who became ambassadors, two who became generals, and all of whom went into public service. Moltke was also involved in the Atlantic slave trade.

- Christian Frederik von Moltke (b. 1736)
- Catharine Sophie Wilhelmine Caroline von Moltke (b. 1737), who married Count Hannibal Wedell in June 1752 married at Hirschholm Palace. She was a lady-in-waiting to Louise of Great Britain, the Queen consort of Denmark and Norway who was married to Frederick V of Denmark
- Caspar Herman Gottlob von Moltke (b. 1738)
- Ulrikke Augusta Vilhelmine Moltke (b. 1740), who married Hans Schack, 4th Count of Schackenborg in 1757.
- Christian Magnus Friedrich Moltke (1741–1813), who was married to Frederikke Elisabeth Reventlow
- Frederik Ludvig von Moltke (b. 1745)
- Berta Countess Moltke (1767–1816) married Frederik Adeler in 1886
- Joachim Godske Moltke (1746–1818)
- Adam Ferdinand Gottlob von Moltke (b. 1748)
- Juliane Maria Frederica Lovisa von Moltke (b. 1751)

Adam Gottlob Moltke lived in retirement until his death on 25 September 1792.

=== Amalienborg ===
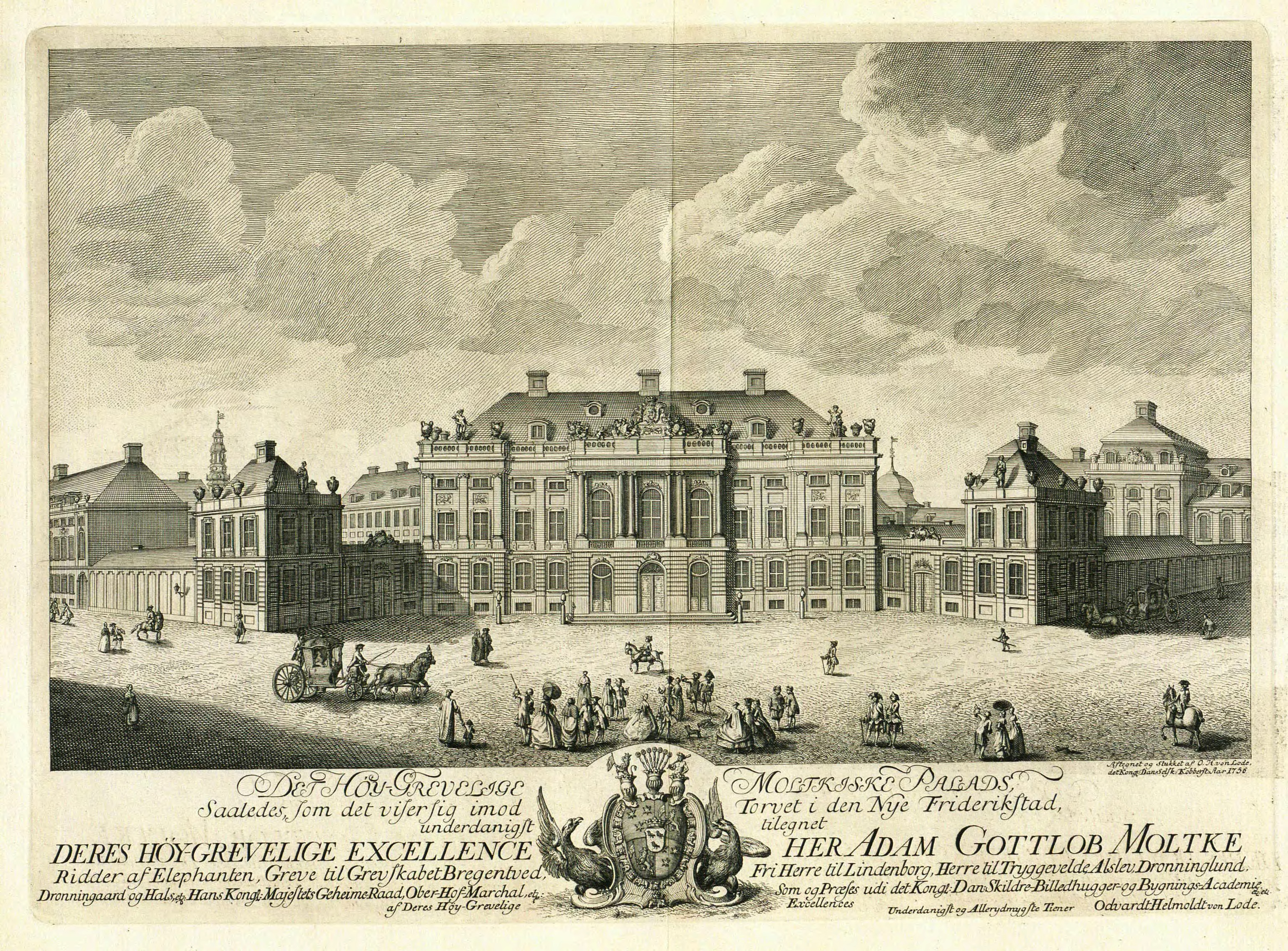
Amalienborg, Moltke's Palace in 1756

From 1748 to 1749, the district of Frederiksstaden was founded by King Frederick V to commemorate the tercentenary of the Oldenburg family's ascent to the throne of Denmark. While the development was the idea of Danish Ambassador Plenipotentiary in Paris, Johann Hartwig Ernst, Count von Bernstorff, Moltke, along with the royal architect, Nicolai Eigtved, spearheaded the construction. The project consisted of four identical mansions, built to house four distinguished families of nobility from the royal circles, placed around an octagonal square. Moltke's mansion, which was erected in 1750–54, was the most expensive of the four palaces at the time it was built, and had the most extravagant interiors. It's Great Hall (Riddersalen) featured woodcarvings (boiserie) by Louis August le Clerc, paintings by François Boucher and stucco by Giovanni Battista Fossati, and is acknowledged widely as perhaps the finest Danish Rococo interior. The mansion formally opened on 30 March 1754, the King's thirtieth birthday.

On 26 February 1794, the Royal Family found itself homeless after the Christiansborg Palace fire. As the Moltke and Schack families were willing to part with their mansions for promotion and money, the royal family, headed by the King Christian VII, acquired the first of the four palaces in the course of a few days, and commissioned Caspar Frederik Harsdorff to turn it into a royal residence. The family occupied the new residence December 1794. These mansions (now called Palaces) form the modern palace of Amalienborg.

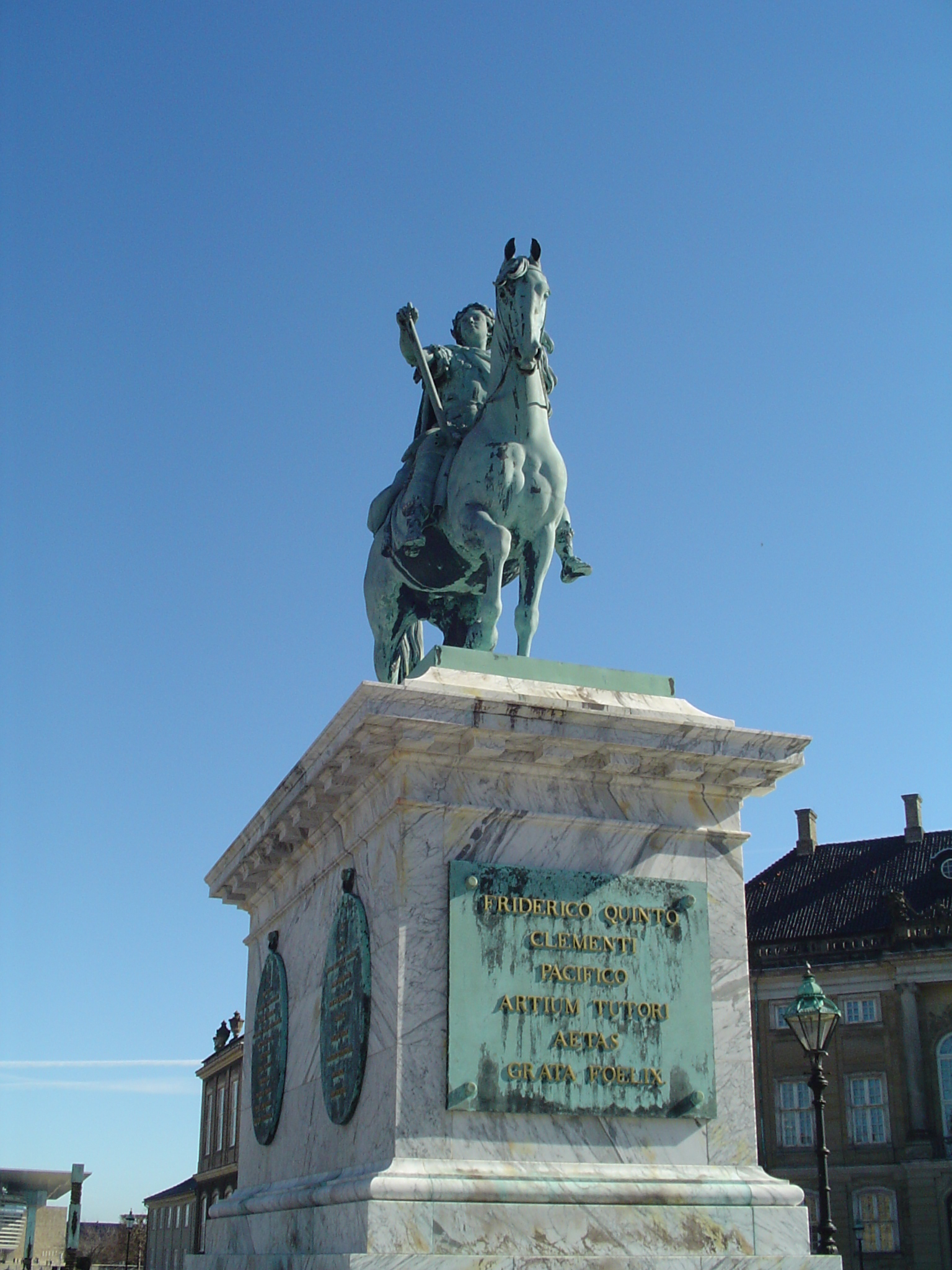
Statue of Frederick V on horseback by Jacques Saly at the centre of the Amalienborg Palace Square. It was commissioned by Moltke, as Director of the Danish Asiatic Company.

=== Legacy ===
In 1753, Moltke, as Director for the Danish Asiatic Company, commissioned an equestrian statue of King Frederik V from French sculptor Jacques-Francois-Joseph Saly. The foundation stone was laid in place in 1760 at the 100-year celebration of political absolutism in Denmark. The statue was finally unveiled in 1771, five years after King Frederik V's death in 1766.

In 1766–1769, he commissioned Caspar Frederik Harsdorff to build a memorial chapel for himself at Karise Church in Faxe, which had been begun Harsdorff's former teacher, architect Nicolas-Henri Jardin.

Moltke owned a large art collection which was displayed in his palace; this was later opened to the public. In 1885 a catalogue was published of the collection, which consisted mostly of Dutch masters. He was elected a Fellow of the Royal Society in 1764. His memoirs, written in German and published in 1870 are of considerable historical importance.
