= Niels Sigfred Nebelong =

Danish architect

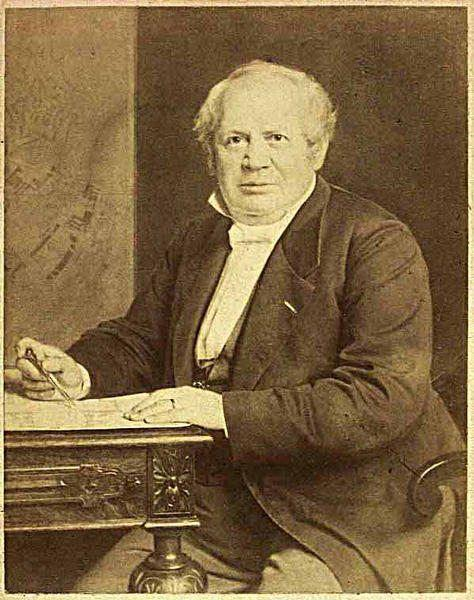
- Born: 14 October 1806; Copenhagen, Denmark
- Died: 9 October 1871 (aged 64)
- Occupation: Architect
- Buildings: Old Carlsberg

Niels Sigfred Nebelong (14 October 1806 – 9 October 1871) was a Danish architect who worked in the Historicist style. He was city architect in Copenhagen from 1863 and also designed many lighthouses around Denmark in his capacity as resident architect for the Danish lighthouse authority.

== Biography ==
=== Early life and education ===
Niels Sigfred Nebelong was born in Copenhagen, Denmark. He was the son of Johan Henrik Nebelong and Anna Christine Schreyber. He was the brother of architect Johan Henrik Nebelong.

In 1819 he was admitted to the Royal Danish Academy of Fine Arts where he studied under German-born, Danish architect Gustav Friedrich Hetsch and won both the small and large gold medal, in 1833 and 1837 respectively. Nebelong taught at the academy for several years before he went abroad on its travel scholarship from 1839 to 1842. He first studied with Henri Labrouste in Paris and then continued to Italy and Greece. After a few years as a teacher at the academy, he travelled to Paris, where he studied under Henri Labrouste, and then continued to Italy and Greece, before returning to Denmark in 1842.

=== Career ===
Back in Denmark, he had two commissions in Kolding. In 1846 he returned to Copenhagen. He became a member of the academy in 1855 and the following year was appointed City Architect in Copenhagen. He also had many private clients. Nebelong also served as resident architect for the Danish lighthouse authority, designing numerous lighthouses around the country. He also designed many town jails and court houses.

His restorations included Ribe Cathedral (1843–45, along with F.F. Friis), Store Heddinge Church (1853–54), Garnisons Kirke, Copenhagen (1860), Tranekær Manor (1862-63) and Hårby Church on Funen (1856). He headed the re-building of Viborg Cathedral (study 1859, restoration commenced together with J. Tholle 1863, completed in 1876, the interior completed by H.B. Storck) but died before its completion.

== Style ==
Typically of the Historicist period, Nebelong worked in a number of different styles, including the late Neo-Classicism (Kolding Gymnasium, 1845–46), Gothic Revival (Slagelse Convent, 1857–59), and Romanesque Revival (Viborg Cathedral, 1863–76, completed by H.B. Storck).

== Selected works ==
- Skive Town Hall, Skive (1844)
- Holsted Courthouse, Holsted (1845)
- Kastrup Glasværk, Kastrup (o. 1845)
- Kolding Gymnasium, Kirketorvet, Kolding (1845–46, ombygget)
- Bogense Customs House, Bogense (1846)
- Town Hall and Court- and Jailhouse, Holstebro (1846, lateral wing added in 1881)
- Town Hall and Court- and Jailhouse, Nykøbing Mors (1846–47, since 1924 only town hall)
- Odense Customs House (adaption and extension), 4 Londongade, Odense (1847)
- Sølyst country house, 321 Vedbæk Strandvej, Vedbæk (1847, redesigned in 1915)
- Blegdamsvej Jailhouse, 6 Blegdamsvej (1847–48, with M. G. Bindesbøll, rebuilt)
- Old Carlsberg: Main building (1852–54) and various other buildings (with J.C. Jacobsen, listed)
- Strandmøllen main building for Johan Christian Drewsen, 895 Strandvejen (1850, vinduer udskiftet)
- Workers housing, 66-70 and 84-88Overgaden oven Vandet, Christianshavn, Copenhagen (1851–52)
- Lunde Church ved Svendborg (1852, tårnet restaureret 1886)
- Villa for rådmand Frederik Christoffer Bülow, 5 Ewaldsgade, Copenhagen (1853, listed)
- 24 Bredgade/2 Sankt Annæ Plads (1855)
- Vartov (rebuilding), Farvergade 27, København (1856–60)
- Skagen Lighthouse, Grenen (1858, listed)
- Vesborg Lighthouse, Kolby, Samsø (1858)
- Slagelse New Convent(1857–59)
- Vridsløselille State Prison (1859)
- Copenhagen Pumping station, mow Pumpehuset, Studiestræde (1859, udpeget som nationalt industriminde 2007)
- Odense Courthouse, 28 Albanigade, Odense (1861, extended)
- Christianshavn Penitentiary, Christianshavns Torv, Christianshavn (1861–64, demolished1928)
- Hirtshals Lighthouse, Hirtshals (1863)
- Viborg Penitentiary (extension), Viborg (1863–64)
- Town Hall, Court- and Jailhouse, Nykøbing Sjælland (1868–69)
- Connecting building, New Carlsberg (1871–76, with Carl Florian Thomsen, demolished)
- Bovbjerg Lighthouse (posthumously 1876–77)

=== Restoration work ===
- Ribe Cathedral, Ribe (1843–45, with F.F. Friis)
- Store Heddinge Churchm Store Heddinge (1853–54)
- Garrison Church, Copenhagen (1860)
- Tranekær Castle (1862–63)
- Hårby Church, Funen (1856)
- Viborg Cathedral (restoration with J. Tholle 1863–1876)
- Trinitatis Church and Rundetårn (1870–71, according to Christian Hansen's renderings)
