= 2025 Stevns municipal election =

Municipal election in Denmark

← 2021	18 November 2025	2029 →

All 19 seats to the Stevns municipal council 10 seats needed for a majority
- Turnout: 13,734 (71.0%) ▲2.1%
	First party	Second party	Third party
	A	V	C
Party	Social Democrats	Venstre	Conservatives
Last election	5 seats, 24.5%	5 seats, 23.8%	3 seats, 13.6%
Seats won	5	4	3
Seat change	0	▼1	0
Popular vote	3,469	2,673	2,010
Percentage	25.6%	19.7%	14.8%
Swing	▲1.1%	▼4.1%	▲1.3%
	Fourth party	Fifth party	Sixth party
	O	F	Æ
Party	Danish People's Party	Green Left	Denmark Democrats
Last election	1 seat, 6.9%	1 seat, 5.3%	Did not stand
Seats won	2	2	1
Seat change	▲1	▲1	▲1
Popular vote	1,183	1,127	793
Percentage	8.7%	8.3%	5.9%
Swing	▲1.8%	▲3.0%	New
	Seventh party	Eighth party	Ninth party
	I	B	Ø
Party	Liberal Alliance	Social Liberals	Red-Green Alliance
Last election	0 seats, 0.9%	1 seat, 5.6%	1 seat, 6.5%
Seats won	1	1	0
Seat change	▲1	0	▼1
Popular vote	709	435	434
Percentage	5.2%	3.2%	3.2%
Swing	▲4.4%	▼2.4%	▼3.3%
Mayor before election
Henning Urban Dam Nielsen
Social Democrats
Mayor after election
Anette Mortensen
Venstre

The 2025 Stevns Municipal election was held on November 18, 2025, to elect the 19 members to sit in the regional council for the Stevns Municipal council, in the period of 2026 to 2029. Anette Mortensen from Venstre, would win the mayoral position.

== Background ==
Following the 2021 election, Henning Urban Dam Nielsen from Social Democrats became mayor for his first term. He would run for a second term.

== Electoral system ==
For elections to Danish municipalities, a number varying from 9 to 31 are chosen to be elected to the municipal council. The seats are then allocated using the D'Hondt method and a closed list proportional representation. Stevns Municipality had 19 seats in 2025.

== Electoral alliances ==
=== Electoral Alliance 1 ===
Party		Political alignment
B	Social Liberals	Centre to Centre-left
F	Green Left	Centre-left to Left-wing
Ø	Red-Green Alliance	Left-wing to Far-Left
Å	The Alternative	Centre-left to Left-wing

=== Electoral Alliance 2 ===
Party		Political alignment
C	Conservatives	Centre-right
I	Liberal Alliance	Centre-right to Right-wing
M	Moderates	Centre to Centre-right
O	Danish People's Party	Right-wing to Far-right
Æ	Denmark Democrats	Right-wing to Far-right

== Results by polling station ==
Division	A	B	C	F	I	M	O	V	Æ	Ø	Å
Division	%	%	%	%	%	%	%	%	%	%	%
Hårlevhallen	25.4	2.9	15.0	7.6	4.8	4.7	9.4	18.8	7.2	3.3	1.0
Strøby Idrætscenter	20.7	3.0	14.2	10.1	5.4	4.2	8.0	26.5	4.0	2.7	1.2
Stevnshallen	28.7	3.0	16.2	7.2	5.6	2.8	10.3	14.5	6.9	4.1	0.8
Sydstevnshallen	31.1	4.5	13.8	7.4	5.1	5.6	6.9	15.7	6.1	2.7	1.0

== Results ==
Party		Votes	%	+/-	Seats	+/-
Stevns Municipality
A	Social Democrats	3,469	25.62	+1.10	5	0
V	Venstre	2,673	19.74	-4.10	4	-1
C	Conservatives	2,010	14.85	+1.26	3	0
O	Danish People's Party	1,183	8.74	+1.82	2	+1
F	Green Left	1,127	8.32	+3.00	2	+1
Æ	Denmark Democrats	793	5.86	New	1	New
I	Liberal Alliance	709	5.24	+4.35	1	+1
M	Moderates	569	4.20	New	0	New
B	Social Liberals	435	3.21	-2.41	1	0
Ø	Red-Green Alliance	434	3.21	-3.34	0	-1
Å	The Alternative	136	1.00	New	0	New
Total		13,538	100	N/A	19	N/A
Invalid votes		41	0.21	-0.15		
Blank votes		155	0.80	-0.13		
Turnout		13,734	71.04	+2.13		
Source: valg.dk

== Opinion polls ==
Polling firm	Fieldwork date	Sample size	A	V	C	O	Ø	B	F	I	M	Å	Æ	Lead
Epinion	4 Sep - 13 Oct 2025	452	28.9	16.9	9.2	7.2	5.2	2.7	10.8	4.0	5.1	0.6	9.0	12.0
2024 european parliament election	9 Jun 2024		16.7	14.8	7.7	9.5	5.1	4.9	15.7	6.5	7.4	1.9	9.6	1.0
2022 general election	1 Nov 2022		27.0	12.5	5.6	4.2	3.0	2.4	10.0	6.2	11.1	1.9	10.3	14.5
2021 regional election	16 Nov 2021		29.4	23.5	14.5	7.2	6.3	3.7	7.1	1.2	–	0.3	–	5.9
2021 municipal election	16 Nov 2021		24.5 (5)	23.8 (5)	13.6 (3)	6.9 (1)	6.5 (1)	5.6 (1)	5.3 (1)	0.9 (0)	–	–	–	0.7
