= 2021 Stevns municipal election =

← 2017	16 November 2021	2025 →

All 19 seats to the Stevns Municipal Council 10 seats needed for a majority
- Turnout: 13,678 (74.8%) ▼2.8pp
	First party	Second party	Third party
	A	V	C
Party	Social Democrats	Venstre	Conservatives
Last election	6 seats, 27.3%	4 seats, 19.5%	2 seats, 9.2%
Seats won	5	5	3
Seat change	▼1	▲1	▲1
Popular vote	3,141	3,054	1,741
Percentage	24.5%	23.8%	13.6%
Swing	▼2.8%	▲4.3%	▲4.4%
	Fourth party	Fifth party	Sixth party
	N	O	Ø
Party	Nyt Stevns	Danish People's Party	Red–Green Alliance
Last election	2 seats, 12.4%	2 seats, 12.0%	2 seats, 6.2%
Seats won	2	1	1
Seat change	0	▼1	▼1
Popular vote	1,182	886	839
Percentage	9.2%	6.9%	6.6%
Swing	▼3.2%	▼5.1%	▲0.4%
	Seventh party	Eighth party
	B	F
Party	Social Liberals	Green Left
Last election	1 seat, 5.9%	0 seats, 2.6%
Seats won	1	1
Seat change	0	▲1
Popular vote	720	682
Percentage	5.6%	5.3%
Swing	▼0.3%	▲2.7%
Mayor before election
Anette Mortensen
Venstre
Mayor after election
Henning Urban Dam
Social Democrats

Ever since the 2007 municipal reform, Venstre had held the mayor's position in Stevns Municipality. Despite only winning 4 seats, 2 less than largest party Social Democrats, in the 2017 election, they had manage to secure the mayor's position.

In this election, the Social Democrats would lose a seat while Venstre would gain a seat, making them equally large for the first time. (Note: counting from the 2007 municipal reform) However, local party Nyt Stevns won 2 seats, and could be decisive, as no bloc had a majority themselves. However, Venstre surprisingly, without citing exactly why, decided to support Henning Urban Dam from the Social Democrats as mayor. This deal included Anette Mortensen from Venstre becoming deputy mayor.

== Electoral system ==
For elections to Danish municipalities, a number varying from 9 to 31 are chosen to be elected to the municipal council. The seats are then allocated using the D'Hondt method and a closed list proportional representation. Stevns Municipality had 19 seats in 2021

Unlike in Danish General Elections, in elections to municipal councils, electoral alliances are allowed.

== Electoral alliances ==
=== Electoral Alliance 1 ===
Party		Political alignment
C	Conservatives	Centre-right
D	New Right	Right-wing to Far-right
I	Liberal Alliance	Centre-right to Right-wing
N	Nyt Stevns	Local politics
O	Danish People's Party	Right-wing to Far-right
V	Venstre	Centre-right

=== Electoral Alliance 2 ===
Party		Political alignment
A	Social Democrats	Centre-left
B	Social Liberals	Centre to Centre-left
F	Green Left	Centre-left to Left-wing
Ø	Red–Green Alliance	Left-wing to Far-Left

== Results by polling station ==
Division	A	B	C	D	F	I	N	O	V	Ø
Division	%	%	%	%	%	%	%	%	%	%
Hårlevhallen	24.5	5.4	11.2	3.8	5.7	0.7	10.5	6.3	24.5	7.4
Strøbyhallen	22.9	5.3	15.1	3.9	6.1	0.9	5.2	5.8	28.8	5.8
Stevnshallen	27.1	5.5	14.3	3.5	4.4	0.8	9.8	7.8	20.5	6.3
Sydstevnshallen	23.7	6.6	13.1	2.6	4.7	1.2	13.8	8.5	18.8	7.0

== Results ==
Party		Votes	%	+/-	Seats	+/-
Stevns Municipality
A	Social Democrats	3,141	24.52	-2.82	5	-1
V	Venstre	3,054	23.84	+4.38	5	+1
C	Conservatives	1,741	13.59	+4.41	3	+1
N	Nyt Stevns	1,182	9.23	-3.20	2	0
O	Danish People's Party	886	6.92	-5.09	1	-1
Ø	Red-Green Alliance	839	6.55	+0.35	1	-1
B	Social Liberals	720	5.62	-0.27	1	0
F	Green Left	682	5.32	+2.71	1	+1
D	New Right	452	3.53	New	0	New
I	Liberal Alliance	113	0.88	-1.69	0	0
Total		12,810	100	N/A	19	N/A
Invalid votes		69	0.36	+0.05		
Blank votes		184	0.97	+0.02		
Turnout		13,063	68.91	-3.83		
Source: valg.dk
