= Stevns =

Stevns may refer to:

- Stevns Municipality
- Stevns Peninsula

== See also ==
- Stevns Klint, a white chalk cliff on Stevns Peninsula
