= Magleby, Stevns Municipality =

Magleby
- Village
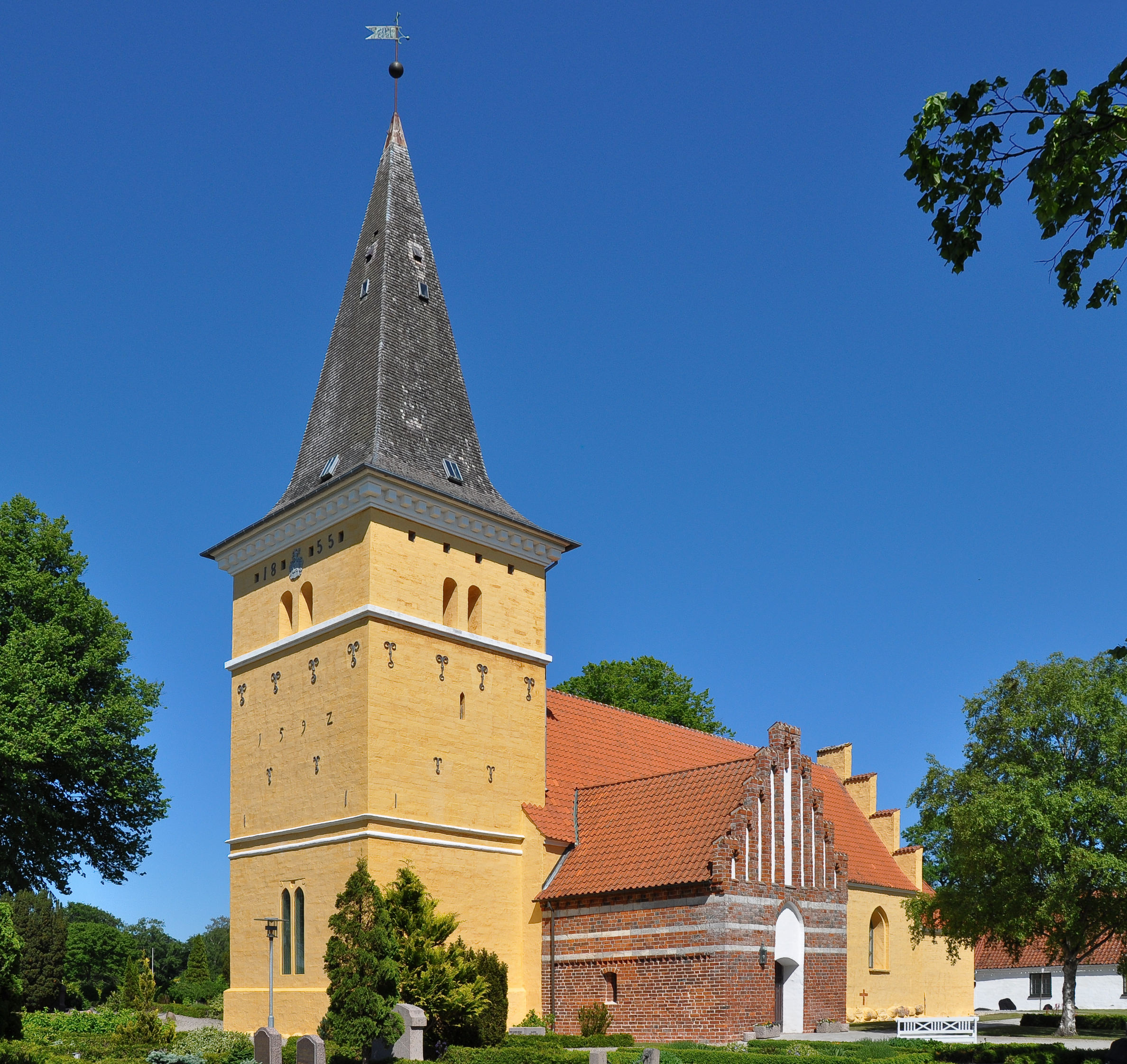
- Magleby Church

- Location in Region Zealand Magleby (Denmark)
- Coordinates: 55°22′2″N 12°20′21″E
- Country: Denmark
- Region: Region Zealand
- Municipality: Stevns

Population (2026)
  - Total: 311
- Time zone: UTC+1 (CET)
  - Summer (DST): UTC+2 (CEST)

Magleby is a village located in the rural parish of Magleby Stevns, seven kilometres northwest of Store Heddinge on the Stevns Peninsula, Stevns Municipality, some 40 km south of Copenhagen, Denmark. As of 1 January 2026, Magleby had a population of 311 in the village and 1,254 in the parish.

== History ==
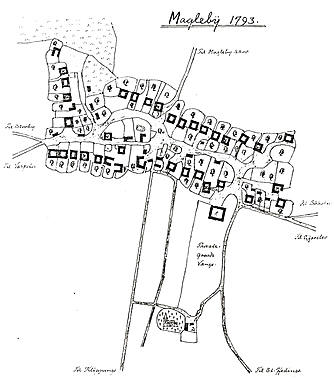
Map of Magleby from 1793

The oldest parts of Magleby Church dates from the 12th century. The name Magleby is first recorded in 1346 as Magdlæby. Magle- (mikil) means "large" and the suffix -by means town or village.

In the Middle Ages, Magleby belonged to Højstrup Manor until it was sold to the Bishop of Toskilde in 1400 by Folmer Jacobsen Lunge. Roskilde Biscopic established Magleby Fief from its land in the parishes of Magleby, Hellested and Bjæverskov. Most of the land came under Vallø after the Reformation.

The first school in Magleby opened in 1630. It was replaced by a rytterskole in 1721. It was destroyed in a fire in 1727 but soon rebuilt.

== Landmarks ==
The most prominent landmark in the village is Magleby Church. It consists of a Romanesque nave, a Late-Gothic chancel and a tower from 1592-93. The Rytterskole has survived as a wing of the now defunct Magleby School. Lindencrones Hospital is a former poorhouse. Skelbæk Friskole an independent primary school, is located just south of the village.

== Transport ==
Magleby is served by Movia buses 251 and 271.
