= Sadolin =

Sadolin is a surname. Notable people with the surname include:

- Birgit Sadolin (born 1933), Danish actress
- Gunnar Asgeir Sadolin (1874-1955), Danish businessmen
- Jørgen Sadolin (1490-1559), Danish bishop
