= Hårlev =

- Town
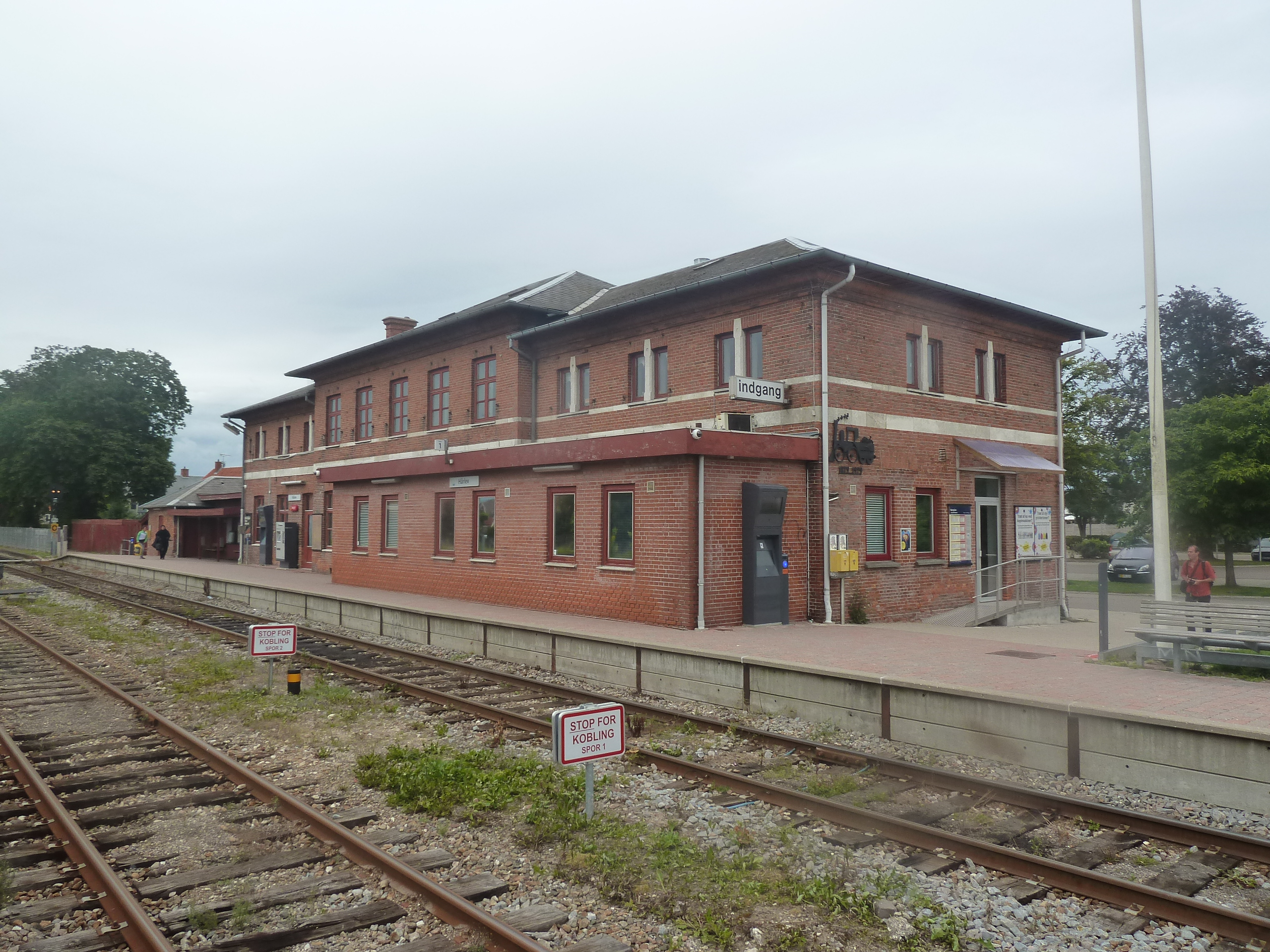
- Hårlev railway station

- Location in Denmark Hårlev (Denmark Region Zealand)
- Coordinates: 55.34908°N 12.23162°E
- Country: Denmark
- Region: Zealand (Sjælland)
- Municipality: Stevns

Area
  - Urban: 2.1 km^{2} (0.81 sq mi)

Population (2026)
  - Urban: 2,957
  - Urban density: 1,400/km^{2} (3,600/sq mi)
- Time zone: UTC+1 (CET)
  - Summer (DST): UTC+2 (CEST)
- Postal code: DK-4652 Hårlev

Hårlev is a railway town with a population of 2,957 (1 January 2026) in Stevns Municipality on the southeastern part of the Danish island of Zealand about 12 kilometres south of Køge.

== Overview ==
Hårlev was located in the former Bjæverskov Hundred (Danish: "Herred")

Until 1 January 2007 Hårlev was the municipal seat of the former Vallø Municipality.

== Geography ==
In spite of being a part of Stevns Municipality Hårlev is not geographical located on the Stevns Peninsula. The town is located just west of the so-called Tryggevælde River Valley (Danish: Tryggevælde Ådal) which marks the northern half of the boundary between the peninsula and the rest of Zealand. Actually it is not a real valley but a wide natural deepening along the banks of Tryggevælde River (Tryggevælde Å).

== Hårlev Church ==
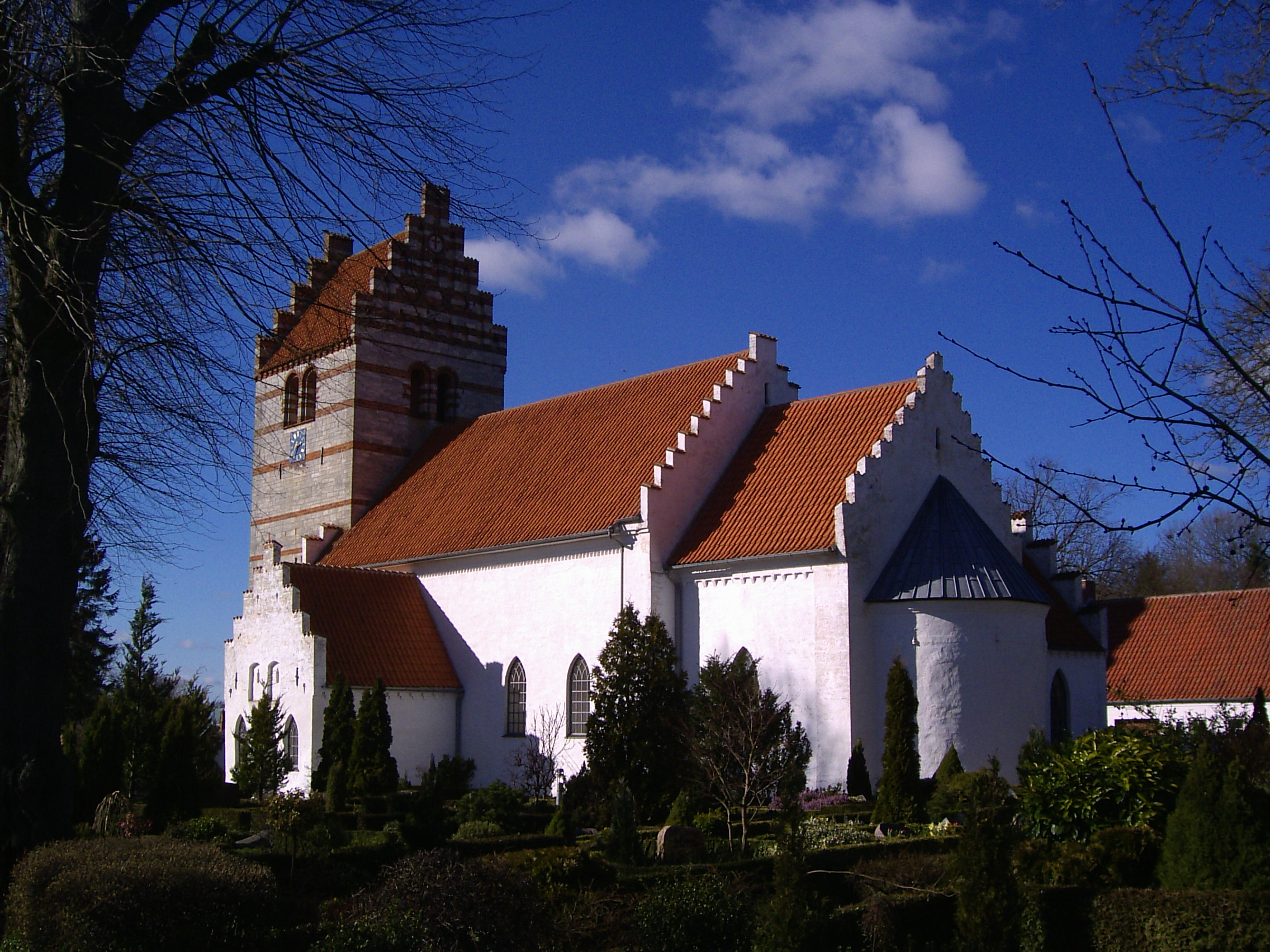
Hårlev Church

Hårlev Church was built between 1175-1275 and is the largest and best preserved of the younger chalk's churches in Stevns Municipality.

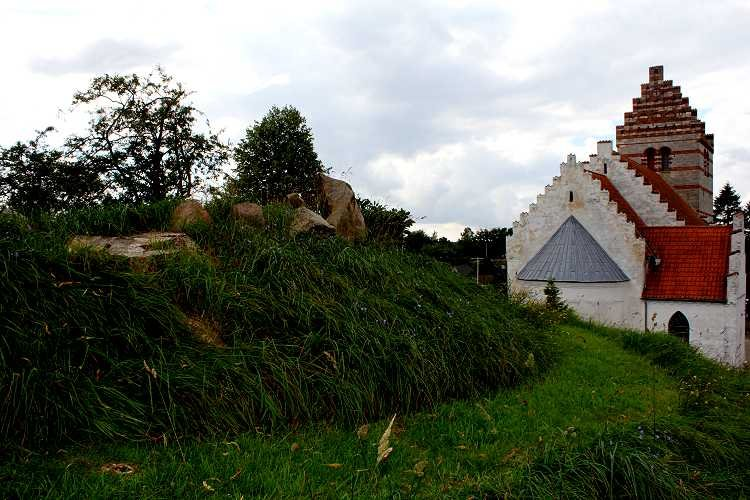
Hårlev Church with Hother's Mound in the foreground

The churchyard is the site of Hother's Mound. We know nothing about Hother, but because the mound has a flat top and is close to the church, it's probably from late antiquity - in Denmark early Viking Age - long before the church was built. It is said that the Tryggevælde Runestone originally stood here.

== Transportation ==
Hårlev is served by Hårlev railway station. The station is located where the railroad Østbanen from Køge divides into two lines, a southeastern line to Store Heddinge and Rødvig and a southern line to Faxe Ladeplads.
