= Strøby =

- Village
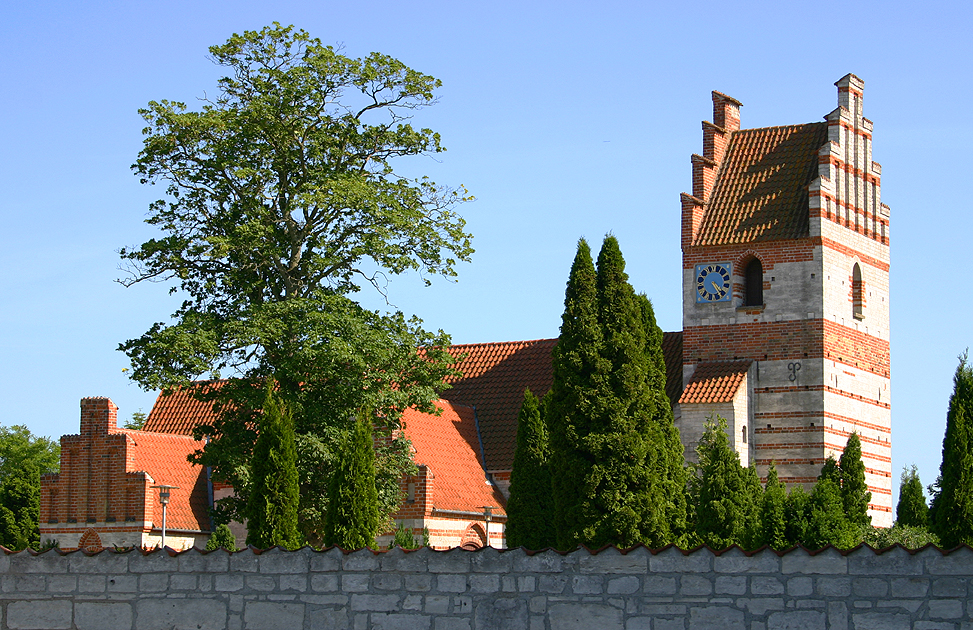
- Strøby Church

- Location in Region Zealand Strøby (Denmark)
- Coordinates: 55°23′2″N 12°16′54″E
- Country: Denmark
- Region: Region Zealand
- Municipality: Stevns Municipality

Population (2026)
  - Total: 719

Strøby is a village, with a population of 719 (1 January 2026), in Stevns Municipality, Region Zealand in Denmark. It is located 5 km southeast of Strøby Egede, 11 km southeast of Køge and 11 km northwest of Store Heddinge.

Strøby Church is located in the village.

== Notable people ==
- The Danish writer Martin A. Hansen (1909–1955) was born in Strøby.
