= Valløby =

- Village
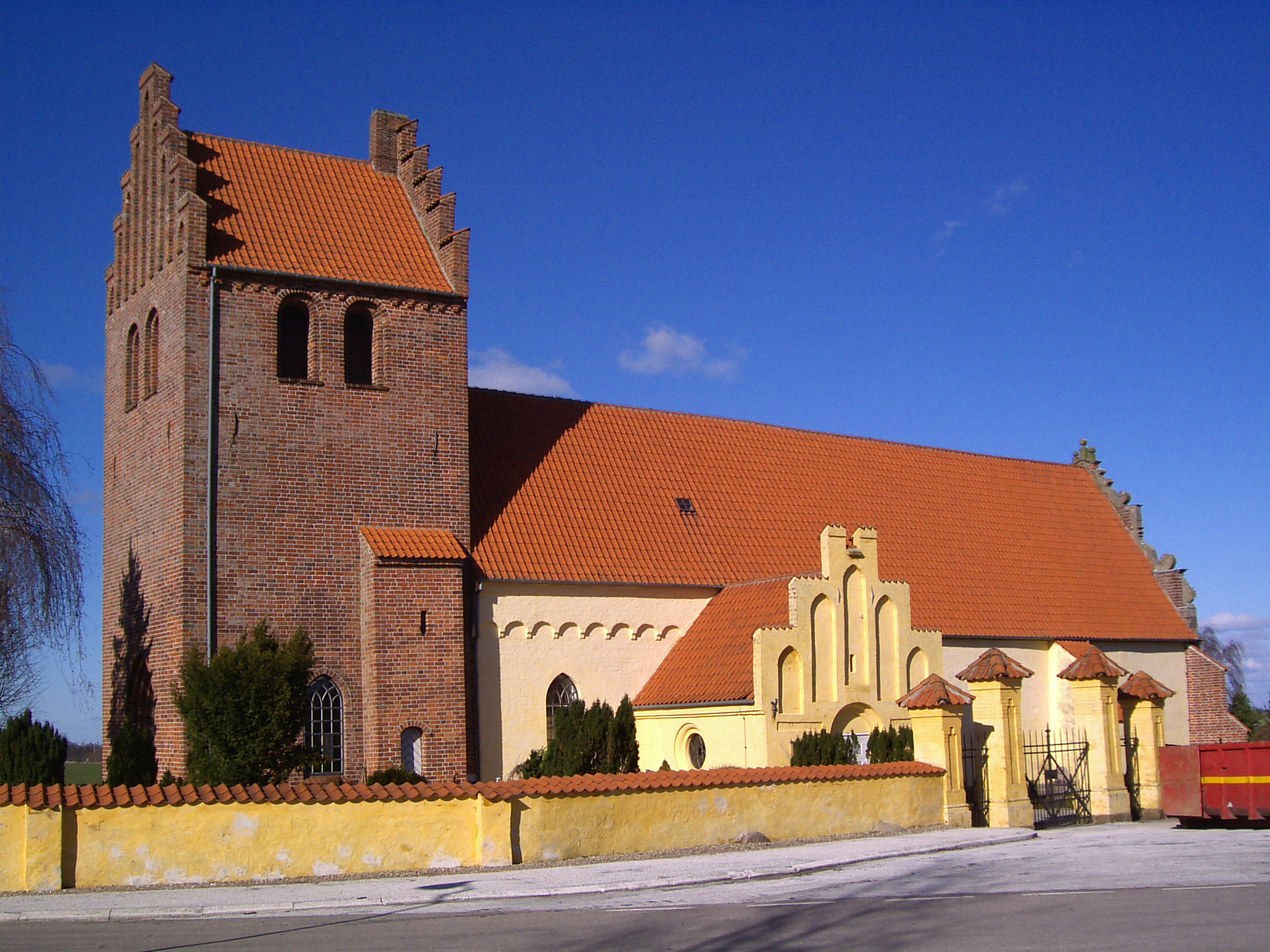
- Valløby Church

- Location in Region Zealand Valløby (Denmark)
- Coordinates: 55°23′56″N 12°14′0″E
- Country: Denmark
- Region: Region Zealand
- Municipality: Stevns Municipality

Population (2026)
  - Total: 752

Valløby is a village, with a population of 752 (1 January 2026), in Stevns Municipality, Region Zealand in Denmark. It is located 7 km south of Køge and 20 km north of Faxe.

Valløby Church is located in the village. It was built in the Romanesque period IE. 1080–1175 and belongs to the oldest of Stevns Municipality's Chalk stone churches.

The manor house Vallø Castle is located about 1 km west of the village.

== Notable people ==
- The businessman and manufacturer Gunnar Asgeir Sadolin (1874–1955) was born in Valløby.
