= Vallø =

Former municipality in Denmark

Coordinates: 55°24′N 12°15′E

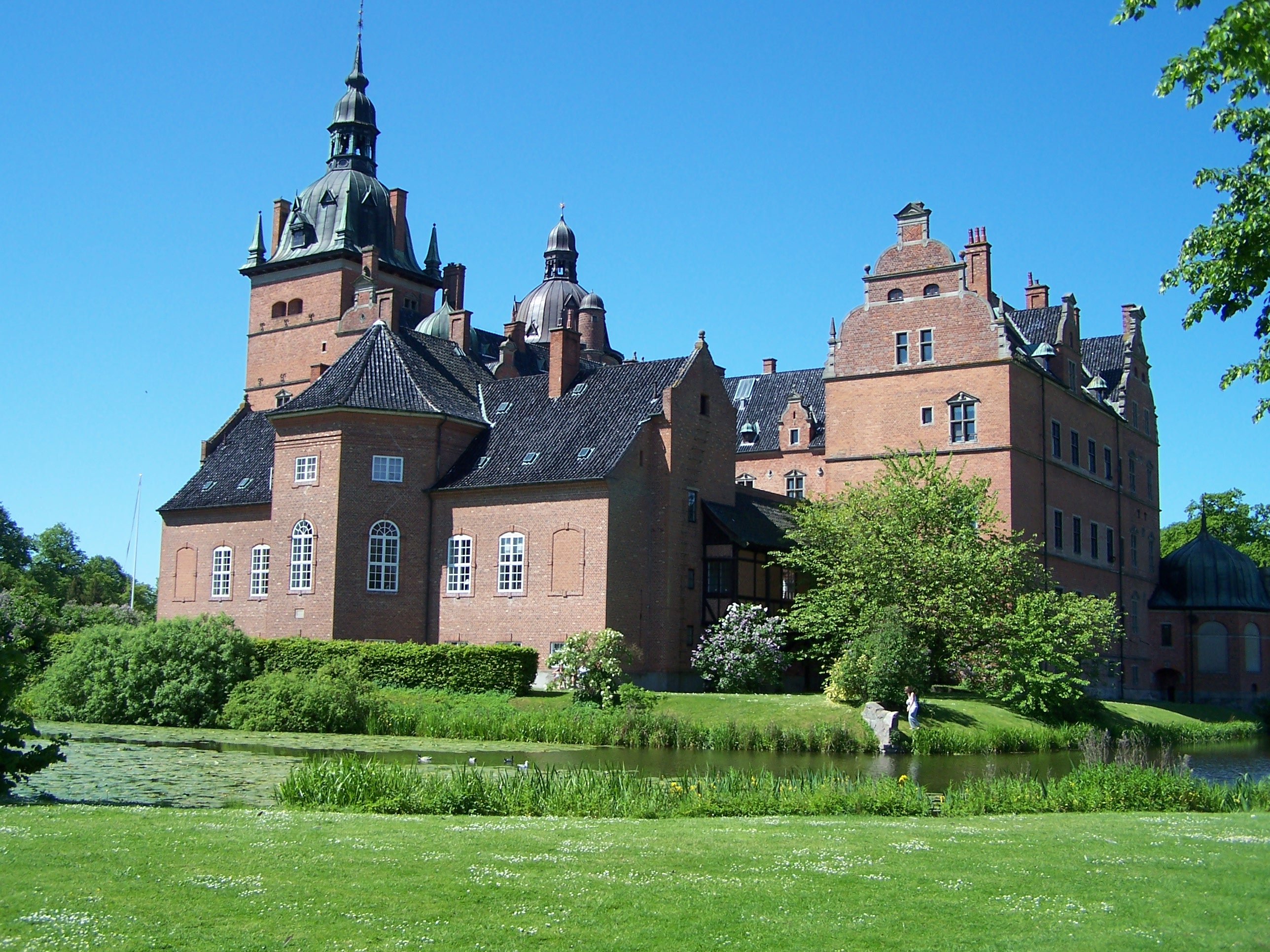
Vallø Castle, home to Vallø stift.

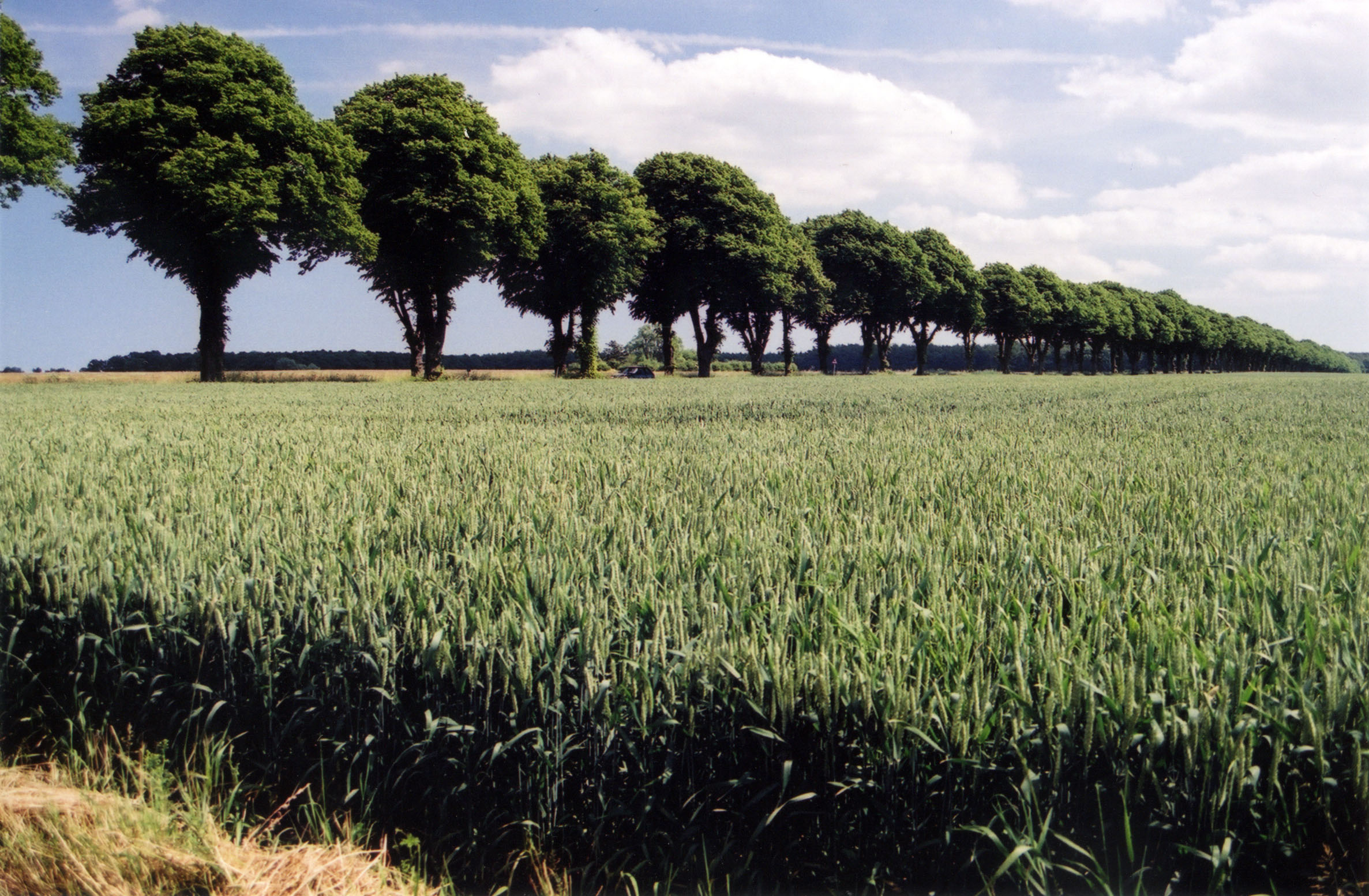
Rural area in Vallø municipality

Vallø was a municipality (Danish, kommune) in the former Roskilde County on the east coast of the island of Zealand (Sjælland) in East Denmark. The municipality covered an area of 84 km^{2}, and had a total population of 10,337 (2005). Its last mayor was Poul Arne Nielsen, a member of the Venstre (Liberal Party) political party.

== Overview ==
The main town and the site of its municipal council was the town of Hårlev.

Neighboring municipalities were Køge to the northwest, Rønnede and Fakse to the southwest, and Stevns to the southeast, to the northeast is Køge Bay (Køge Bugt).

On January 1, 2007, Vallø municipality was, as the result of Kommunalreformen ("The Municipality Reform" of 2007), merged with the existing municipality of Stevns to form a new Stevns Municipality. This created a municipality with an area of 247 km^{2} and a total population of 21,776 (2005). The new municipality belongs to Region Sjælland ("Zealand Region").

== See also ==
- Hårlev
- Stevns Municipality
