= Faxe Ladeplads =

Faxe Ladeplads Fakse Ladeplads
- Town
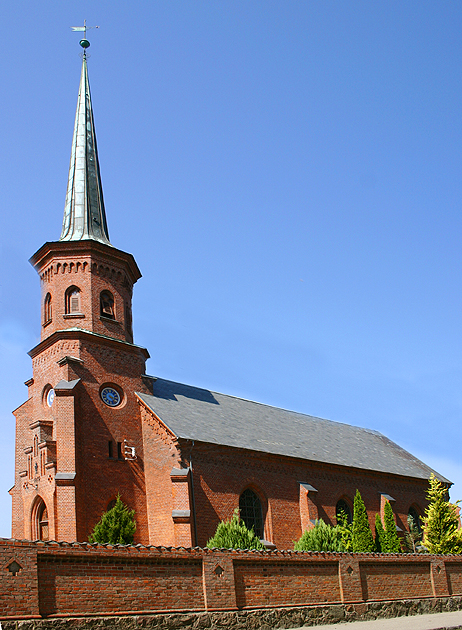
- Hylleholt Church in Faxe Ladeplads

- Location in Denmark Faxe Ladeplads (Denmark Region Zealand)
- Coordinates: 55°13′00″N 12°10′00″E
- Country: Denmark
- Region: Zealand (Sjælland)
- Municipality: Faxe

Area
  - Urban: 1.8 km^{2} (0.69 sq mi)

Population (2026)
  - Urban: 2,496
  - Urban density: 1,400/km^{2} (3,600/sq mi)
- Time zone: UTC+1 (CET)
  - Summer (DST): UTC+2 (CEST)
- Postal code: DK-4654 Faxe Ladeplads

Faxe Ladeplads or Fakse Ladeplads is a coastal town in Denmark with a population of 2,496 (1 January 2026). It is located in Zealand, 5 kilometers south-east from Faxe. It is mainly a harbour town, with a working harbour and marina. The town is surrounded by forest and sandy beaches with shallow water. The forest stretches all the way to the sea, and from the edge one can see the island of Møn and the small protected wildlife park, Feddet.

== History ==
The town was originally called Hylleholt. The current name comes from a time in the 19th century when the countship of Vemmetofte decided to build a harbour to service the limestone industry up in the neighboring Faxe town. Ladeplads literally means stock area. Hylleholt Church, constructed in 1878, is located in the town.

== Education ==
Hylleholt School was founded in 1878. In the first years it was referred to as Strandskolen (lit. 'The Beach School') because of the town's location by the beach. In 1975 the building of a new school began on Dannebrogsvej 1, because of the old school's lack of modernization, expansion opportunities and the fact that the school was very expensive to heat.

Two efterskoles are located in Faxe Ladeplads: Faxehus Efterskole and Waldemarsbo Efterskole. Waldemarsbo Efterskole began on Hylleholtvej 6, in 1979 in Faxe Ladeplads. Faxehus Efterskole began on Strandstræde 3, in 1980, in Faxe Ladeplads. Its buildings were built in 1908 and functioned as a beach resort.

== Transportation ==
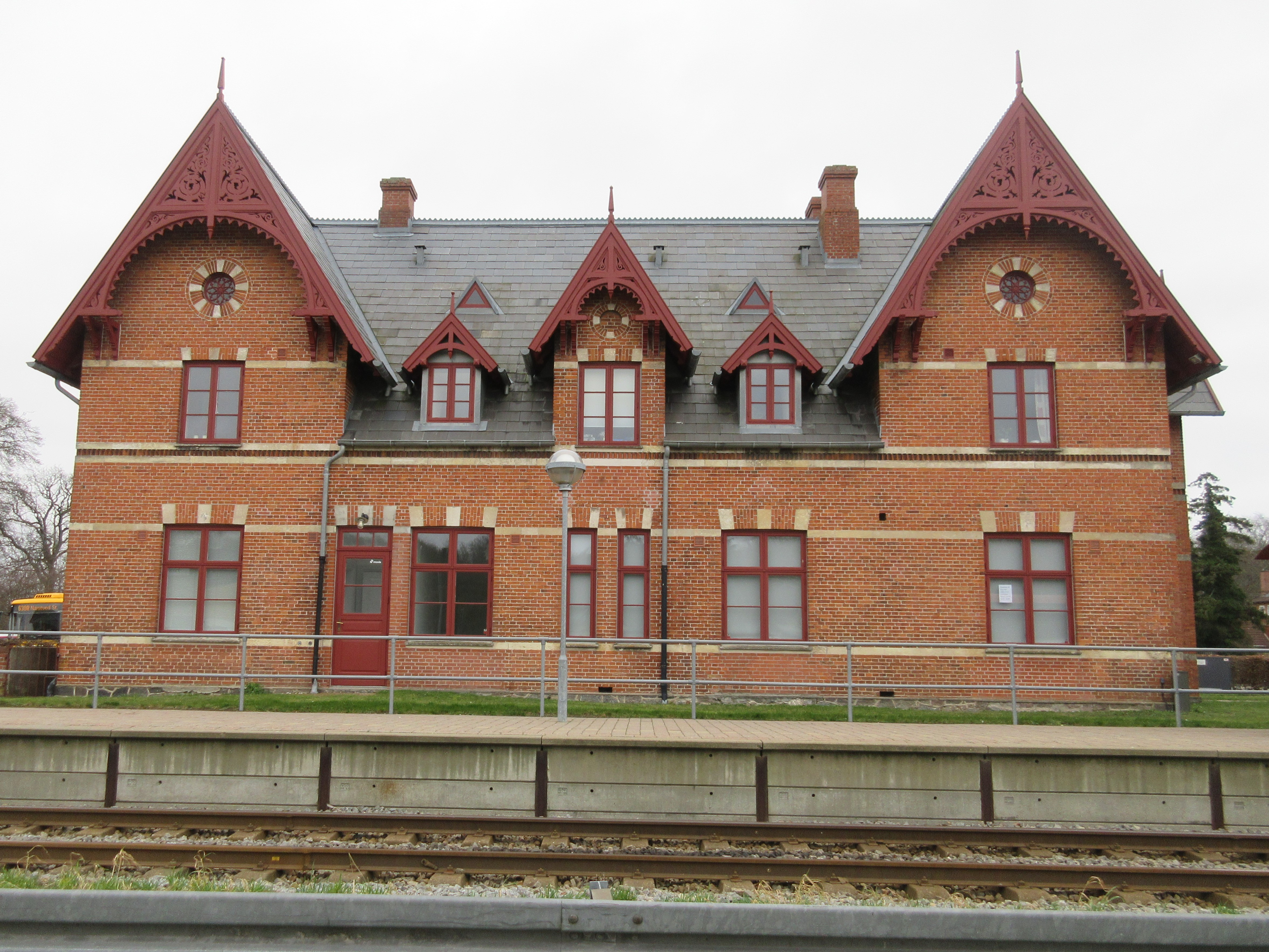
Faxe Ladeplads railway station in 2020.

The local railway, the East Line, was inaugurated in 1879, and runs from the Faxe Limestone Quarry to the harbor in Faxe Ladeplads. Faxe Ladeplads is served by Faxe Ladeplads railway station, which is connected on the East Line with Køge and the rest of the Danish rail network.

== Attractions ==
The main attraction is the nature and fresh air from the sea. A couple of campsites exist in the area.

== Notable people ==
- Malthe Engelsted (1852–1930 in Faxe Ladeplads), Danish Master of Arts and painter
- Sir Alfred William Flux CB (1867–1942 in Faxe Ladeplads), British economist and statistician; retired to Denmark in 1932 and was knighted in 1934
