= Store Heddinge Church =

Octagonal Danish church in Store Heddinge

Coordinates: 55°18′46″N 12°23′30″E

- Saint Katharina Church
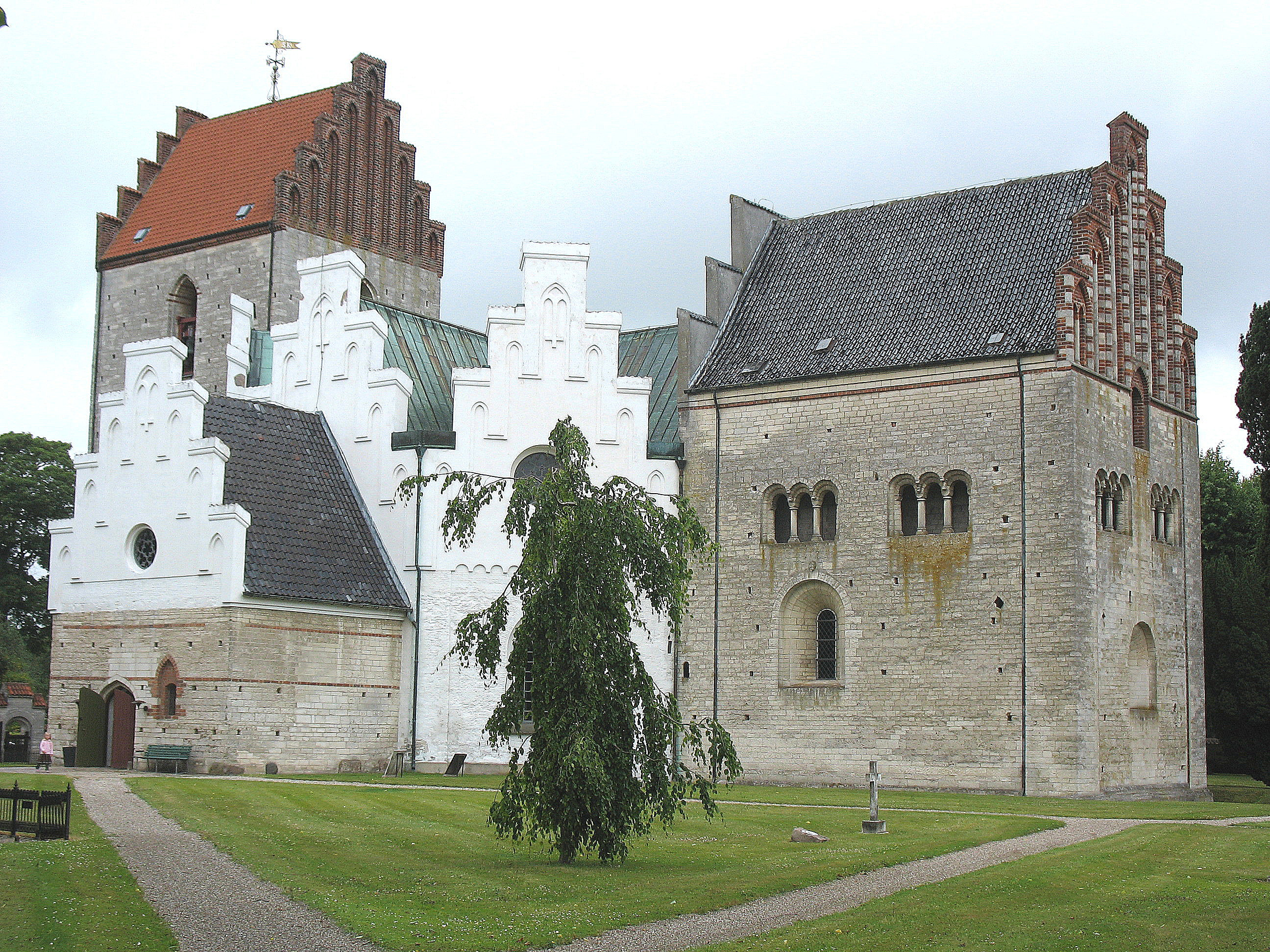
- Store Heddinge Church
- Location: Store Heddinge, Denmark
- Denomination: Church of Denmark
- Website: https://www.storeheddingekirke.dk

Architecture
- Architectural type: Romanesque style, gothic architecture
- Years built: c. 1200

Administration
- Diocese: Diocese of Roskilde
- Parish: Store Heddinge Sogn

Store Heddinge Church also known as Saint Katharina Church (Danish: Store Heddinge Kirke or Sankt Katharina Kirke) is an octagonal church in the town of Store Heddinge on the Danish island of Zealand. Thought to have been built of limestone in the late 12th century by King Valdemar I, the unusual octagonal Romanesque nave and the choir were later extended with lateral Gothic additions, including the tower.

== Gallery ==
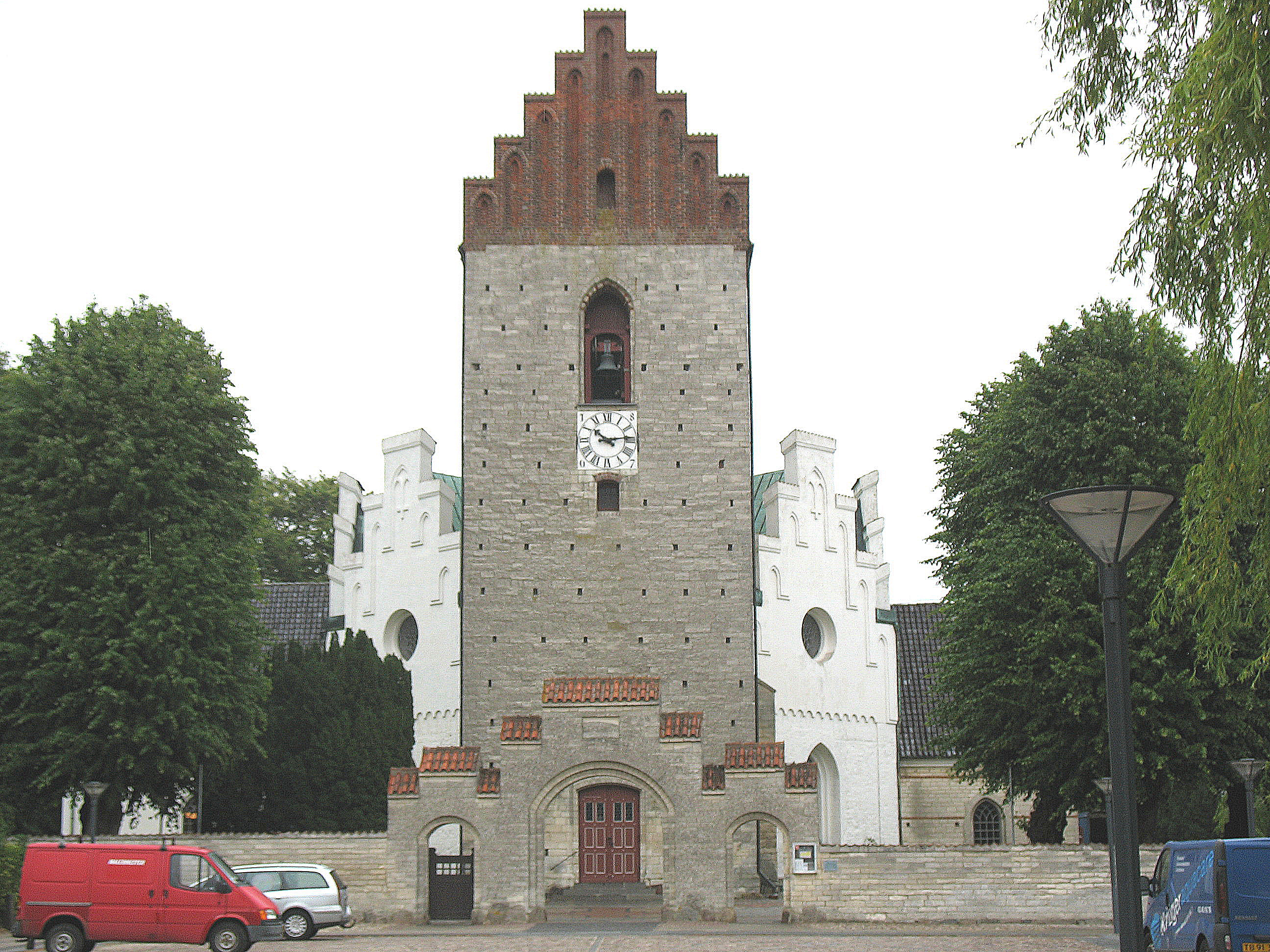
Front view of the church entrance

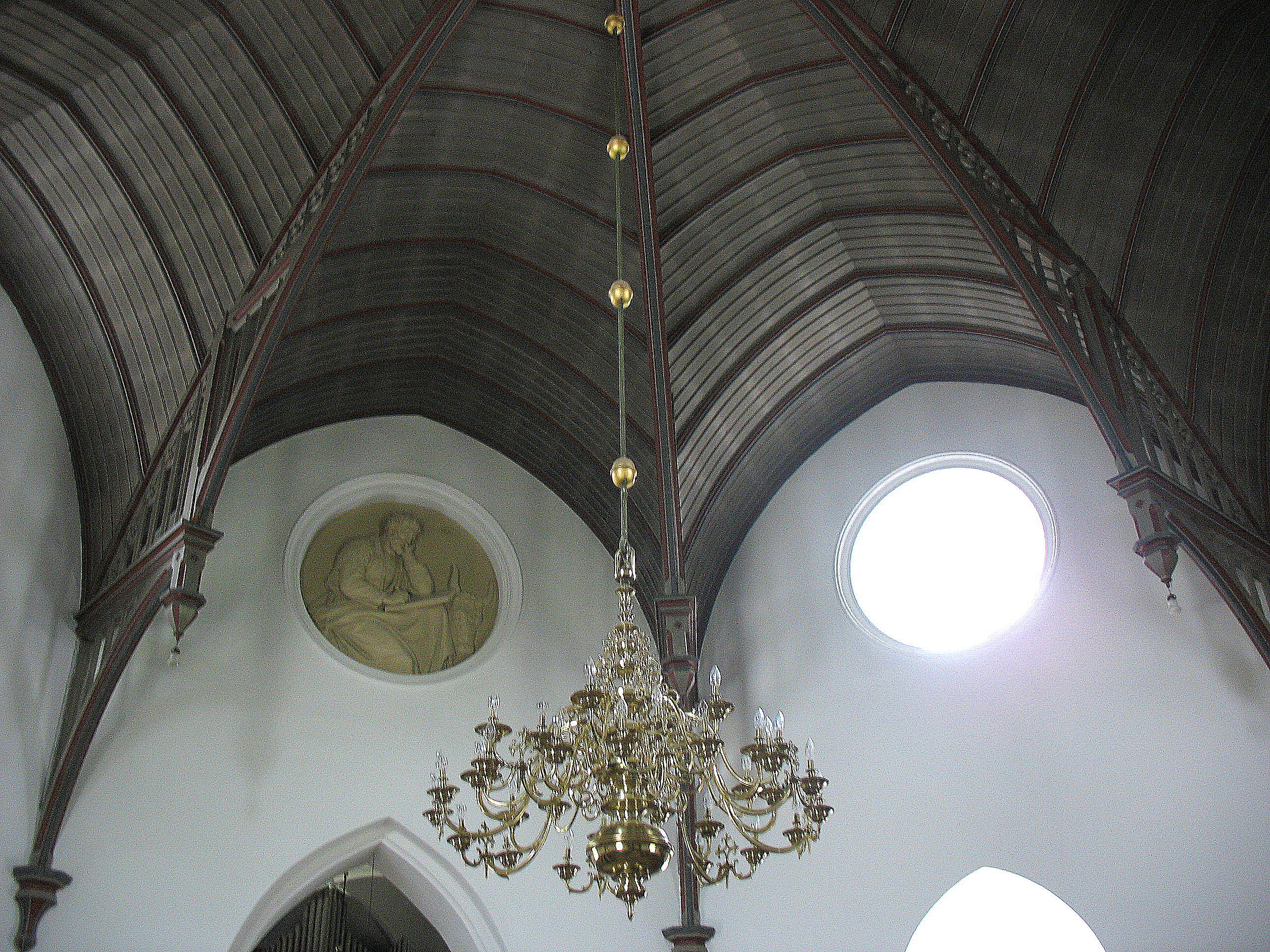
Wooden vault of the octagonal nave

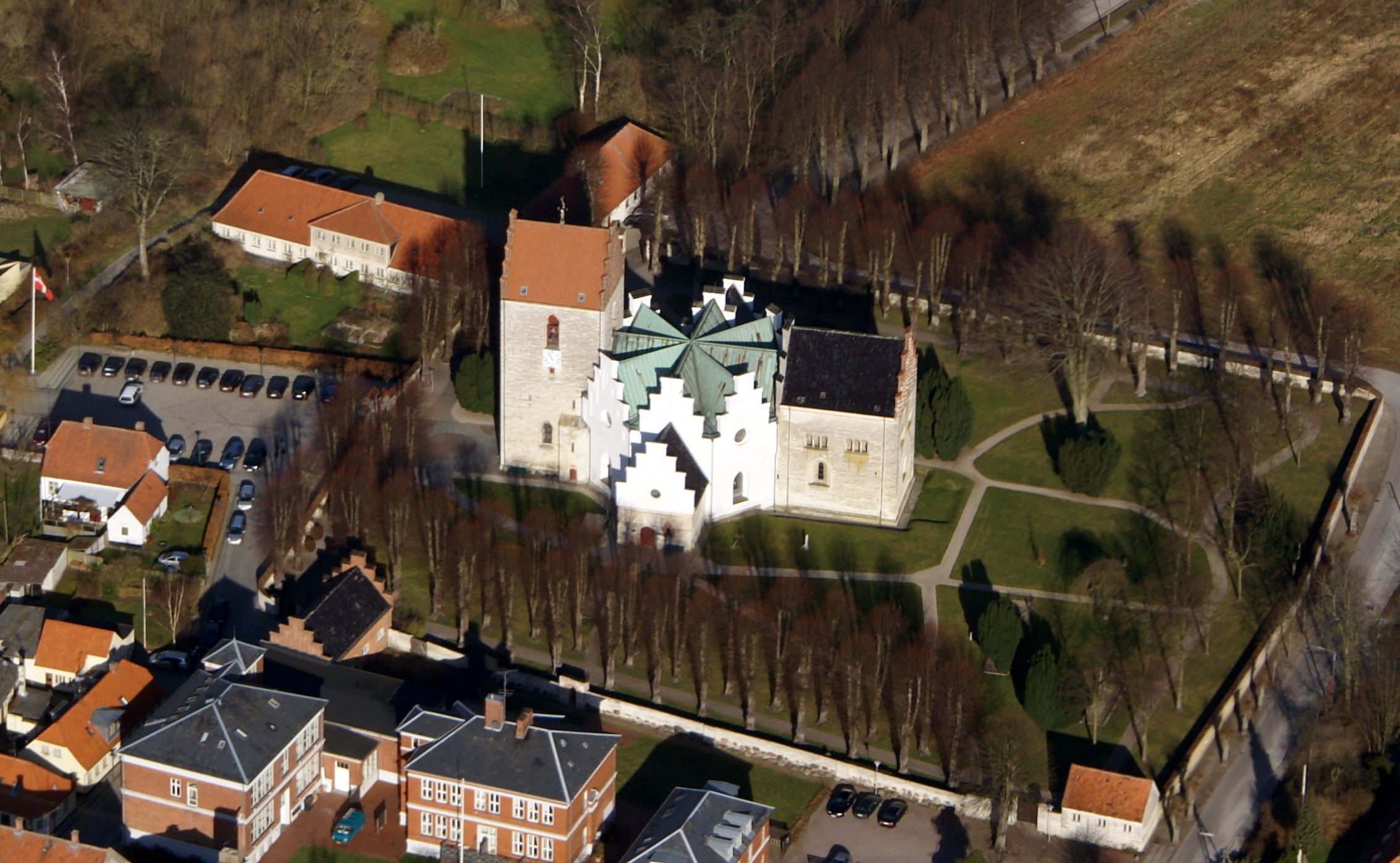
Areal view of the church grounds
