= Gunnar Asgeir Sadolin =

Danish businessman and painter

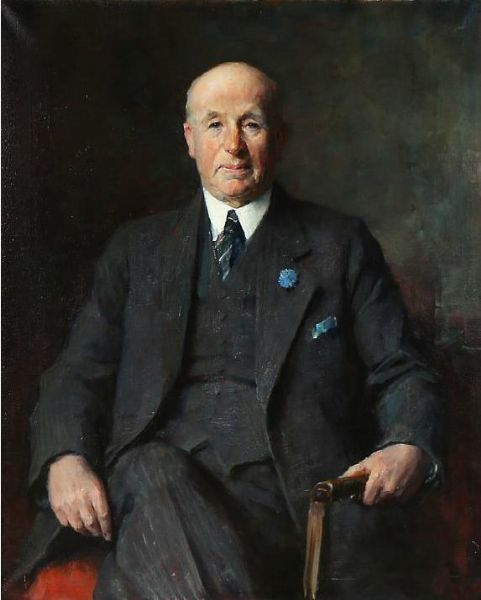
- Sadolin painted by Herman Vedel in 1941
- Born: 15 February 1874; Valløby, Stevns Municipality, Denmark
- Died: 17 March 1955 (aged 81); Dragør, Denmark
- Occupation: Businessman
- Awards: Knight of the Order of the Dannebrog, 1932

Gunnar Asgeir Sadolin (5 February 1874 – 17 March 1955) was a Danish businessman.

== Early life ==
Sadolin was born in Valløby, the son of parish priest Ole Jørgen Sadolin (1826–1908) and Louise Suzette Emilie Marcussen (1838–1906).

Sadolin passed the preliminary exams at the University of Copenhagen in 1890 and then worked for half a year in a mechanical workshop. He had aspirations to become an artist and therefore studied at Copenhagen Technical School, the Royal Danish Academy of Fine Arts and Kristian Zahrtmann's art school in 1890–96.

He was considered a promising student but temporary visual impairment led him into the theoretical and practical study of dyes. Burial finds in Egypt had recently brought attention to encaustic paintings, and this inspired him to conduct a series of successful experiments with wax-based dyes.

In 1907, he established a small business, Gunnar A. Sadolins Farvefabrik (paint factory), with funding from his brothers Frode Sadolin and Jørgen Theophilus Sadolin and the physician Olav Høgsbro, who each invested DKK 100 in the venture. The production took place in a single room in Fasangården with Sadolin's fiancé and later wife as the only employee. On 18 May 1909, A/S Sadolin's Farver (Sadolin's Paints) was founded with merchant Gustav Hage (1852–1935) and engineer Alexander Foss (da) (an uncle of Sadolin's fiancé) as the largest stakeholders. On 2 July 1912, the company merged with Holmblad & Co.s Eftf. under the name Sadolin & Holmblad. From 1914 Sadolin served as chief technical officer (teknisk direktør) of the company while his brother Knud Sadolin served as chief commercial officer (merkantil direktør) for the company. The product range was constantly expanded and A/S Kemisk Værk Køge - KVK - in Køge was established as a manufacturer of dry pigments and aniline dyes, and agrochemicals - especially herbicides.

Gunnar Asgeir Sadolin and Knud Sadolin both retired in 1949 and were succeeded as directors by Gunnar Asgeir Sadolin's son Dan Alexander MacGregor Sadolin (21 July 1914 – 2 January 2000) and son-in-law Kaj Egeø Poulsen (1912-1993) and Knud Sadolin's son-in-law Orla Christian Greisen (1914-1994).

== Personal life and family ==
Sadolin married Esther Margrethe Schultz (1 March 1888 - 13 October 1964) on 26 December 1910. She was a daughter of lighthouse master William Schultz (1850–1914) and Bertha Brøchner (1858–1921), and she was the favorite niece of Danish industrialist and politician Alexander Foss.

Sadolin owned a large collection of classical Dutch, Italian and Spanish art.

He died on 17 March 1955 and is buried in Valløby Cemetery.

Esther Margrethe Sadolin, the widow of Gunnar Asgeir Sadolin, succeeded him as Vice Chairman of the Board of Directors at both A/S Sadolin & Holmblad and at A/S Kemisk Værk Køge, both from 1955 and until 1964. Esther Margrethe Sadolin became in 1957 the partner of Axel Fingal Wallenberg (1874-1963), who was from the Swedish Wallenberg Dynasty, and himself an army major, an industrialist, the Swedish Government’s envoy to Washington D.C, and the Chairman of the Knut and Alice Wallenberg Foundation in Stockholm, Sweden, which controlled and controls many large corporate groups - such as ASEA / ABB, Atlas Copco, Electrolux, Ericsson, SAAB and SKF.

Sadolin’s House (Sadolins Hus), their mansion in Dragør, Denmark, which since 1965 have been owned by the Dragør Municipality and since 1967 is housing the Dragør Library, is named after them.

Three generations followed after Gunnar Asgeir Sadolin at A/S Sadolin & Holmblad:

His son Dan Alexander MacGregor Sadolin (1914-2000), the 10th Baron MacGregor of Inneregny, who was educated at A/S Sadolin & Holmblad, and had a B.B.A. from England and a M.B.A. from the USA, began as a Trainee and was for many years the Co-President and the CEO of the Sadolin's International Division at A/S Sadolin & Holmblad and the Chair of Board of Directors of most of its many foreign subsidiaries and associated companies. Dan Alexander MacGregor Sadolin was also Member of Boards of Directors at A/S Sadolin & Holmblad and A/S Kemisk Værk Køge, then both listed corporate groups at the Copenhagen Stock-Exchange.

His grandson, Peter Asgeir MacGregor Sadolin (1940-2011), the 11th Baron of Inneregny, who was educated at The East Asiatic Company Ltd. in Copenhagen, and had a B.B.A. from Denmark and a M.B.A. from France, was the General Manager baa (Printing Inks factory) at DYO ve Sadolin in Izmir, Turkey, and later a Vice President and the Export and Licensing Director of Sadolin Printings Ink Ltd. company in Denmark, then the Managing Director of this company, and afterwards a Senior Vice President and the Divisional Director for the Sadolin Printing Inks Division at A/S Sadolin & Holmblad. Peter Asgeir MacGregor Sadolin was also the Président-Directeur Général (PDG) for both Division Bâtiment Technique (Sadolin) S.A.R.L. and Sadolin France S.A., which had offices at La Maison du Danemark on 142 Champs-Élysées in Paris, France.

His great-grandson, Nikolaj Asgeir MacGregor Sadolin - called Nick MacGregor-Sadolin (b. 1969), the 12th Baron MacGregor Sadolin, a B.B.A. from England and a M.B.A. from England/Germany as well as a M.S. (Economics) from Sweden and a M.A. (History) from Denmark, was an International Marketing Trainee at Sadolin GmbH. in Berlin, Germany, at Division Bâtiment Technique (Sadolin) S.A.R.L. in Paris, France, at Sadolin Paints (Cyprus) Ltd. in Nicosia, Cyprus, and at Chemcraft Sadolin, Inc. in Toronto, Ontario, Canada. Nick MacGregor-Sadolin, was later an Export Manager at DYO ve Sadolin A.S. in Izmir, Turkey, and he continued with the new owner of A/S Sadolin & Holmblad, Nobel Industrier AB (Nobel Industries) in Stockholm, Sweden, as a Corporate Strategy Manager at this large Swedish holding company.
