= Strøby Egede =

- Town
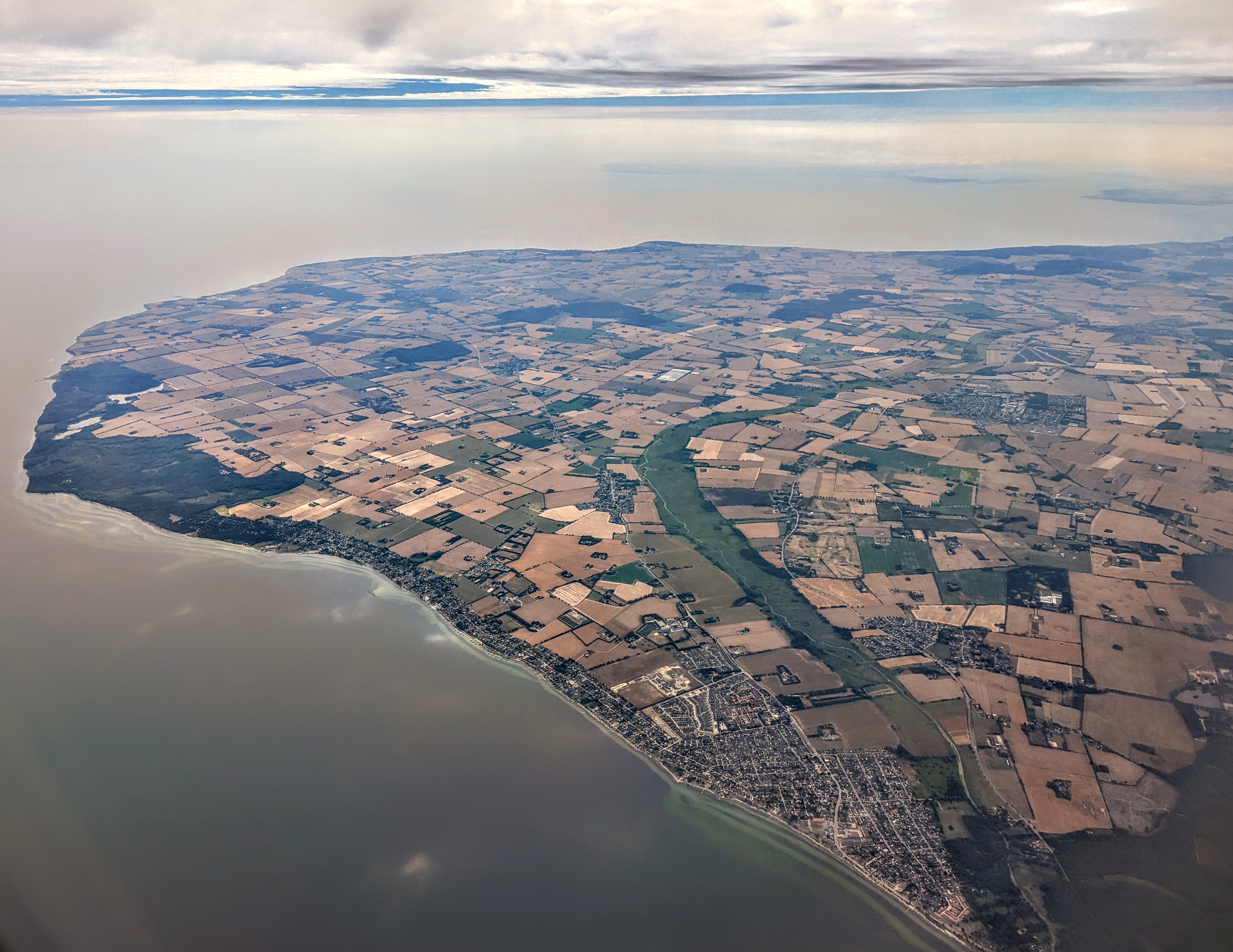
- Aerial view of Strøby Egede (lower right) through Køge Sønakke (leftmost tip), looking southeast across Køge Bay

- Location in Denmark Strøby Egede (Denmark Region Zealand)
- Coordinates: 55°25′2″N 12°14′35″E
- Country: Denmark
- Region: Region Zealand
- Municipality: Stevns Municipality

Area
  - Urban: 3.3 km^{2} (1.3 sq mi)

Population (2026)
  - Urban: 5,103
  - Urban density: 1,500/km^{2} (4,000/sq mi)
  - Gender: 2,526 males and 2,577 females
- Time zone: UTC+1 (CET)
  - Summer (DST): UTC+2 (CEST)
- Postal code: DK-4600 Køge

Strøby Egede is a coastal town, situated on the southwestern shore of Køge Bay on the east coast of the Danish island of Zealand, 5 km southeast of Køge and 6 km east of Herfølge.

Strøby Egede is the northernmost and most populous urban area in Stevns Municipality, with a population of 5,103 (1 January 2026).

The discovering of a mass grave, with human remains, dating to the late Mesolithic Ertebølle culture, showed that the area what is now Strøby Egede was inhabited already in the Stone Age. The grave consisted of skeleton remains of eight individuals of multiple ages from 35-45 years old to newborn children and is now on display at Køge Museum.
