= Kolding Gymnasium =

Kolding Gymnasium, HF-kursus og IB World School

Location
- Skovvangen 10, 6000 Kolding; Denmark; 55.508264°N 9.474431°E

Information
- Founded: 1542; 484 years ago
- Founder: Queen Dorothea
- Principal: Sune Hother Petersen
- Staff: 85 teachers, plus support staff.
- Language: Danish, English
- Colours: Red and black
- Nickname: KG
- Rival: Munkensdam Gymnasium
- Website: https://kolding-gym.dk

Kolding Gymnasium is a Danish senior secondary school (gymnasium) which offers STX (known in Danish as Almen studentereksamen). the Higher Preparatory Examination (known in Danish as the Højere Forberedelseseksamen or HF) and the International Baccalaureate Diploma Programme.

== History ==
Kolding Gymnasium was founded in 1542 by Dorothea of Brandenburg, Queen of Denmark, and relocated to new buildings in 1975, where it remains up to date. The school adopted the IBDP as one of its main types of education in 2002. In 2006 the school suffered extensive water damage, forcing some students to stay home for a week and take lessons during the Danish winter vacation in order to reach the required number of lessons before the academic year-end.

Since then, the school has had much ongoing repairs in which, a new auditorium has been built and the façade of the school renovated.

In 2019 Sune Hother Petersen became the principal of the School

Since the War in Ukraine a large number of Ukrainian students have enrolled into the Diploma programme and Pre-IB, 27 students from Ukraine since the war began.

The Schools will also be adding biology as one its course subjects in the Diploma programme starting with the 2025/2026 academic year

== Clubs and events ==
The school and students organise clubs and social events, such as SVADA, Fredagscafé, Model United Nations, idrætsdag (Sports day). Each academic year the school organises a Global Masterclass which is a trip that students can participate to experience a foreign country and learn its history or culture.

Every year the schools participates with SDU (University of Southern Denmark) to have 'SDU takeover', where students from SDU set up small classes about different educational opportunities at SDU after their education in Kolding Gymnasium.
