= Stevns Municipality =

Stevns Municipality Stevns Kommune (Danish)
- Municipality
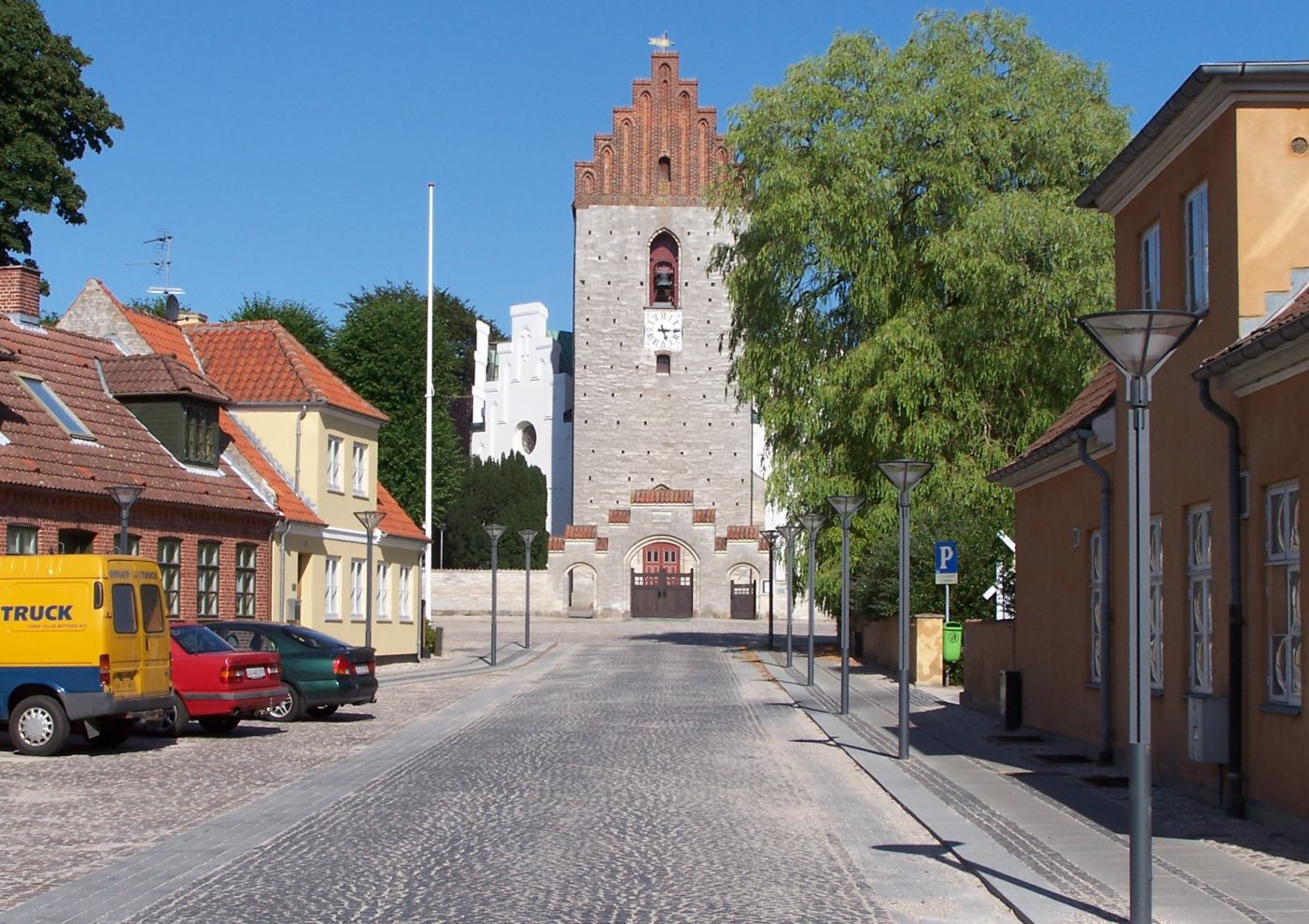

- Coat of arms

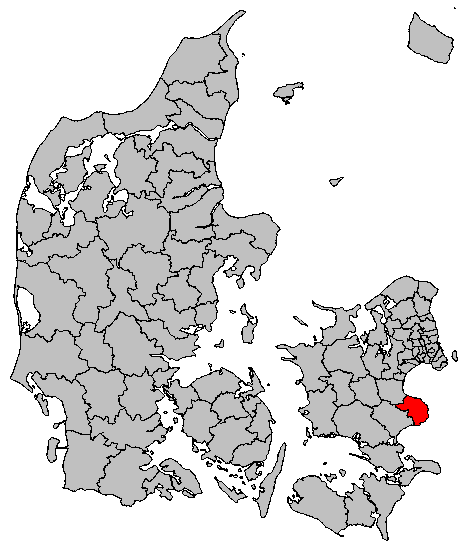
- Coordinates: 55°20′00″N 12°19′00″E
- Country: Denmark
- Region: Zealand
- Established: 1 January 2007
- Seat: Store Heddinge

Government
  - Mayor: Annette Mortensen (V)

Area
  - Total: 249.92 km^{2} (96.49 sq mi)

Population (1 January 2026)
  - Total: 23,842
  - Density: 95.399/km^{2} (247.08/sq mi)
- Time zone: UTC+1 (CET)
  - Summer (DST): UTC+2 (CEST)
- Postal code: 4660
- Municipal code: 336
- Website: stevns.dk

Stevns Municipality (Danish: Stevns Kommune) is a kommune in the Region Sjælland on the southeast coast of the island of Zealand in south Denmark. The municipality covers an area of 250 square kilometres (97 sq mi), and has a population of 23,842 (1 January 2026). The municipality covers most of Stevns Peninsula.

The third largest town and the site of its municipal council is the town of Hårlev.

On 1 January 2007 Stevns municipality, as the result of Kommunalreformen ("The Municipal Reform" of 2007), merged with Vallø municipality to form an enlarged Stevns municipality.

== Locations ==
The ten largest locations in the municipality are:

Strøby Egede	3,900
Store Heddinge	3,200
Hårlev	2,500
Rødvig	1,600
Valløby	760
Strøby	670
Hellested	610
Klippinge	520
Magleby	320
Lyderslev	320

=== The town of Store Heddinge ===
The town of Store Heddinge came into existence during the 13th century, and Saint Katharina Church (Sct. Katharina kirke) is also from that time. The town received privileged status as a merchant town in 1441. A Latin preparatory school was founded in the town in 1620, but was closed down in 1739.

== Politics ==
=== Municipal council ===
Stevns' municipal council consists of 19 members, elected every four years.

Below are the municipal councils elected since the Municipal Reform of 2007.

Election	Party									Total seats	Turnout	Elected mayor
Election	A	B	C	F	L	N	O	V	Ø	Total seats	Turnout	Elected mayor
2005	9		2	1			2	13		27	74.6%	Poul Arne Nielsen (V)
2009	6		1	2	2		1	7		19	71.0%	Poul Arne Nielsen (V)
2013	5	1	1		1		2	8	1	19	75.2%	Mogens H. Nielsen (V)
2017	6	1	2			2	2	4	2	19	72.7%	Anette Mortensen (V)
Data from Kmdvalg.dk 2005, 2009, 2013 and 2017

== Attractions ==
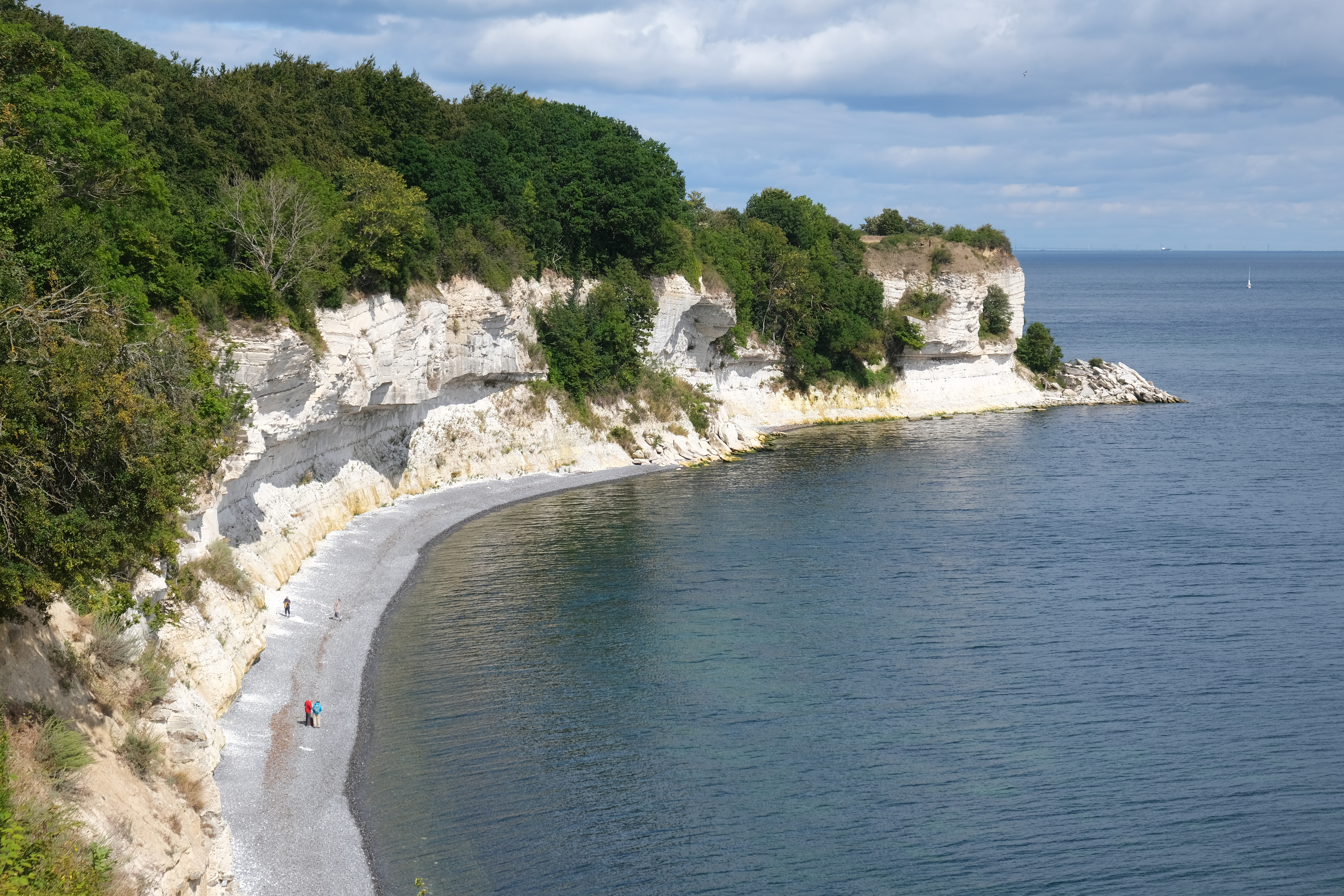
Stevns Klint

The area is known for its white chalk cliffs, which are quite rare in Denmark. Stevns Klint (Stevns' Cliffs), a popular tourist attraction, is one of these. The old town church by the small village of Højerup collapsed partially over the cliffs in 1928 due to erosion.

The cliffs at Højerup are also the place where the father-and-son team of scientists Luis and Walter Alvarez measured the highest level of iridium in the Cretaceous–Paleogene boundary layer, which led them to propose their hypothesis that the Cretaceous–Paleogene extinction event was caused by an impact of a large asteroid 66 million years ago.

By 2014 Stevns Klint was listed on UNESCO List of World Heritage Sites in Northern Europe.

In 2008 the Cold War Museum Stevns Fortress opened to the public. It features a large exhibition of military equipment and a 1.5-hour guided tour in the large underground system of the fortress. The underground system of the fortress features 1.6 kilometres (0.99 mi) of tunnels, living quarters, command centers, hospital and even a chapel. And in addition two ammunition depots for its two 15 centimetres (5.9 in) cannons. The tunnels are 18–20 metres (59–66 ft) below surface excavated in the chalk of Stevns. This top secret fortress was built in 1953 and remained operational until 2000.

Stevns is also home to Elverhøj (Elves' Hill), while not much of an attraction, it is famous for the fairy tale The Elf Mound by H.C. Andersen and the Danish national play Elves' Hill, both of which in Danish share the name Elverhøj.

== Notable people ==
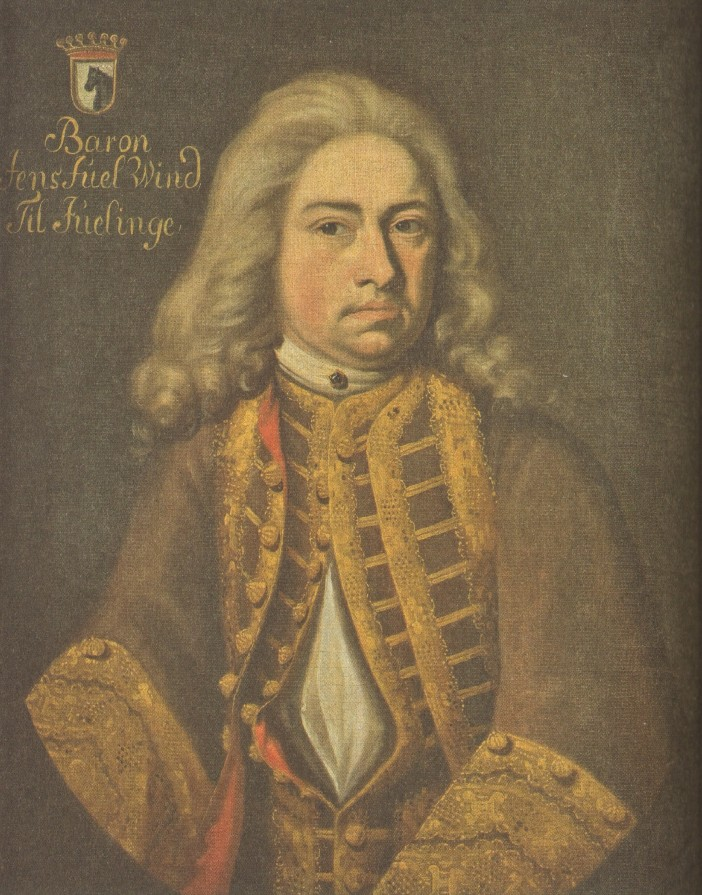
Jens Juel-Vind

- Peder Syv (1631–1702), philologist, folklorist and parish priest at Hellested from 1664 until 1702
- Berte Skeel (1644 in Vallø Castle – 1720), noble, philanthropist and estate owner of Selsø Manor
- Jens Juel-Vind (1694 in Huellinge – 1726), baron of Juellinge, chamberlain, and landowner.
- Christen Lindencrone (1703–1772), landowner and supercargo, owned Gjorslev Manor 1743-1772
- Severine Casse (1805 in Lyderslev – 1898), women's rights activist and an influential member of the Danish Women's Society
- Hans Peter Johan Lyngbye (1834 in Vallø Castle – 1920), businessman, dealing with timber and salvage
- Gunnar Asgeir Sadolin (1874 in Valløby – 1955), businessman and manufacturer of dry pigments and Aniline dyes
- Martin A. Hansen (1909 in Strøby – 1955), author and member of the Danish resistance during WWII
- Gitte Karlshøj (born 1959 in Lyderslev), long-distance runner, ran the 3000 metres at the 1992 Summer Olympics

== Image gallery ==
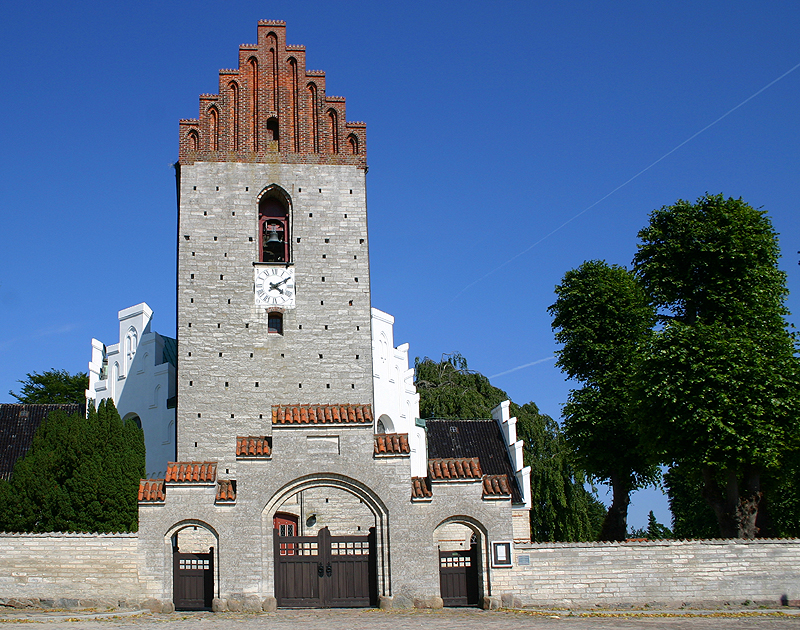
St. Catherine's Church, Store Heddinge

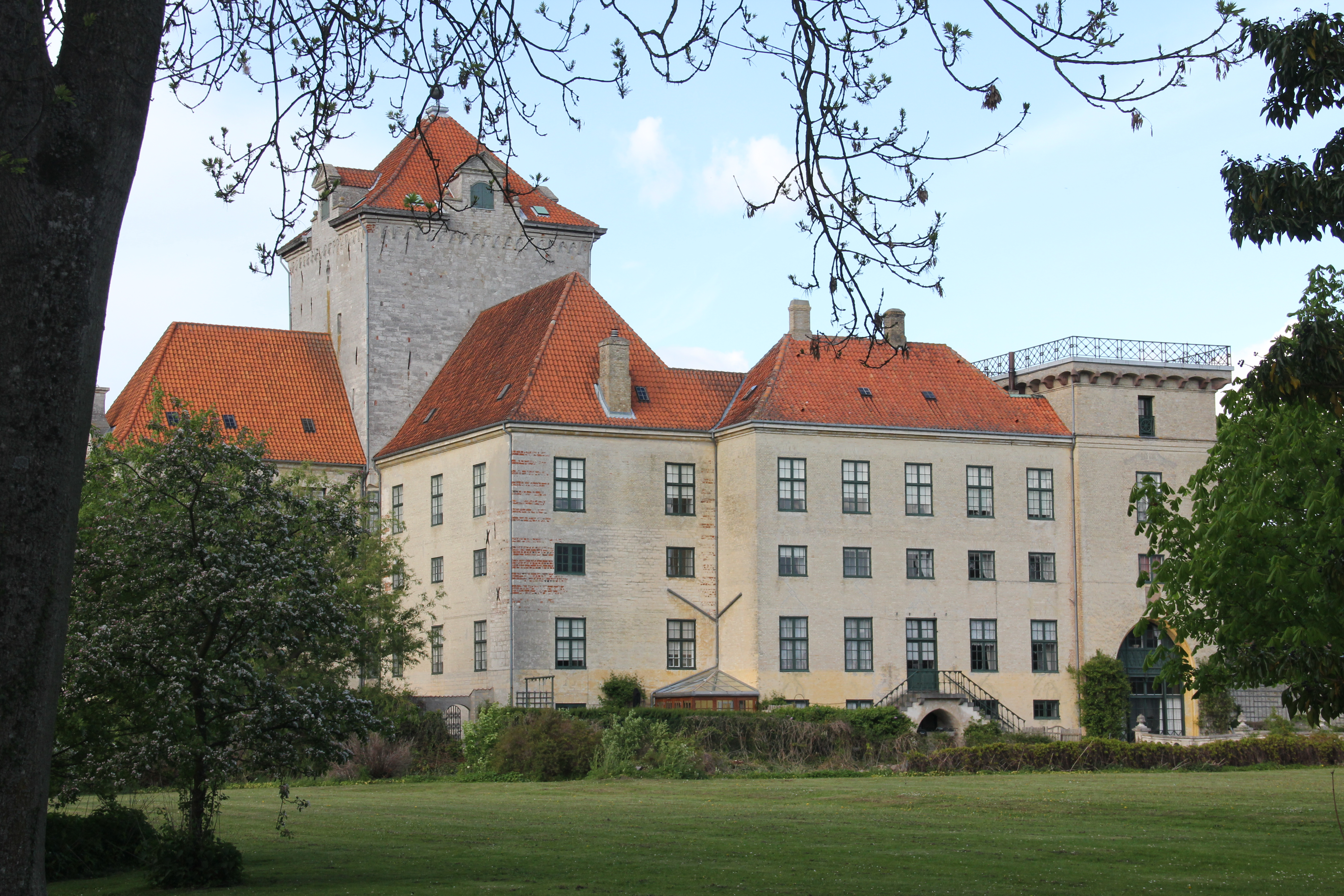
Gjorslev Castle

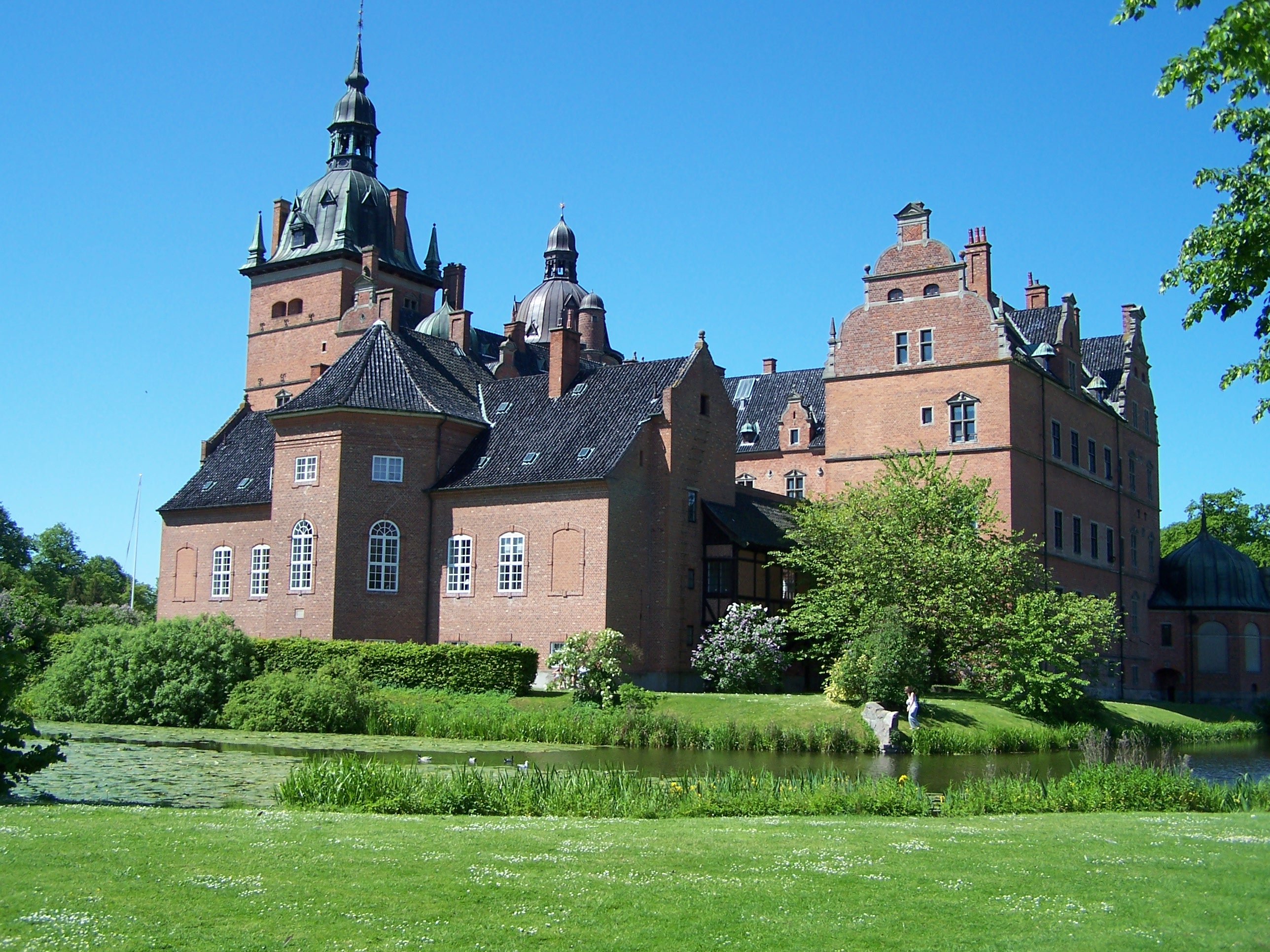
Vallø Castle

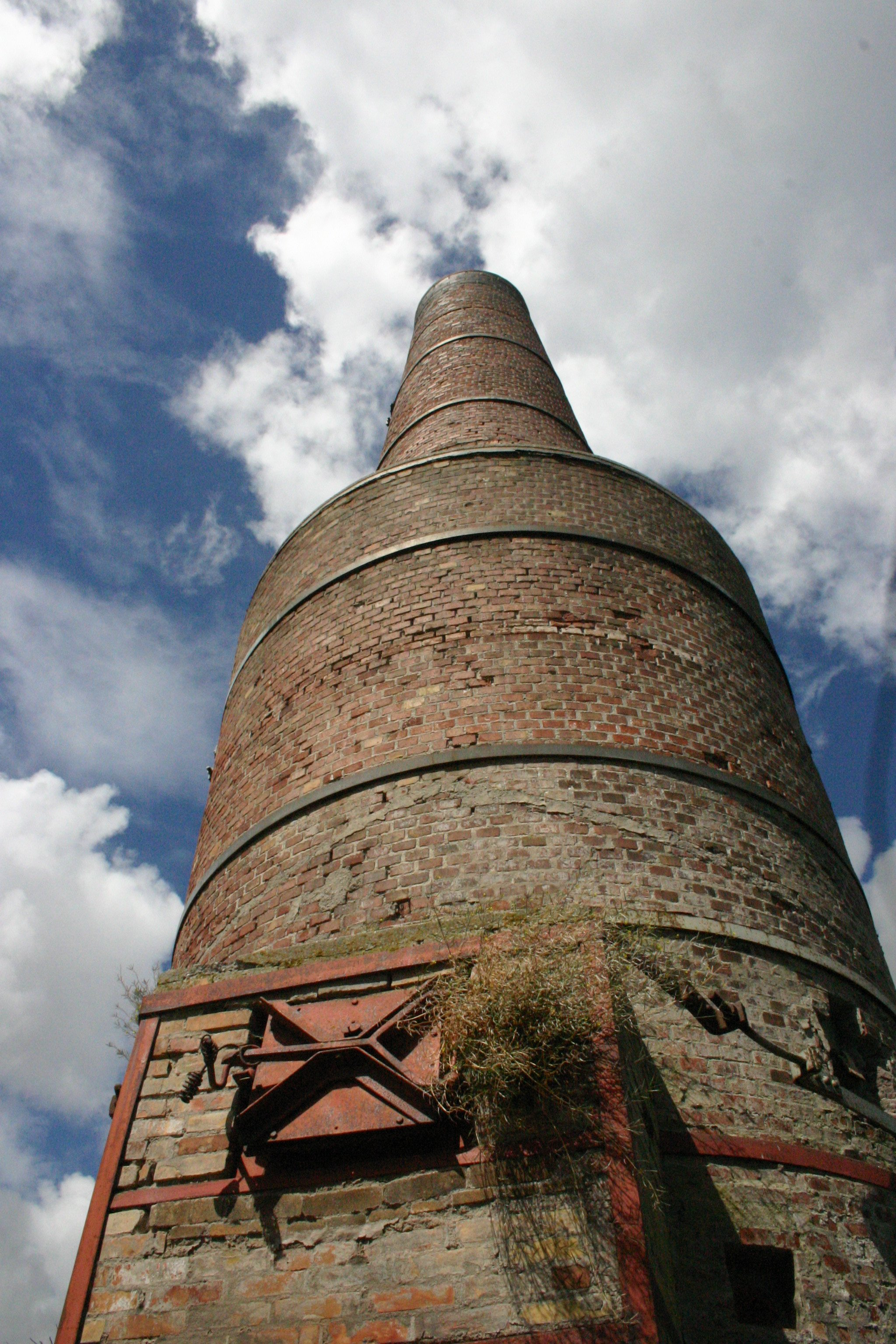
Boesdal Kalkbrud
