= Stevns Peninsula =

Peninsula in Denmark

Coordinates: 55.3°N 12.3°E

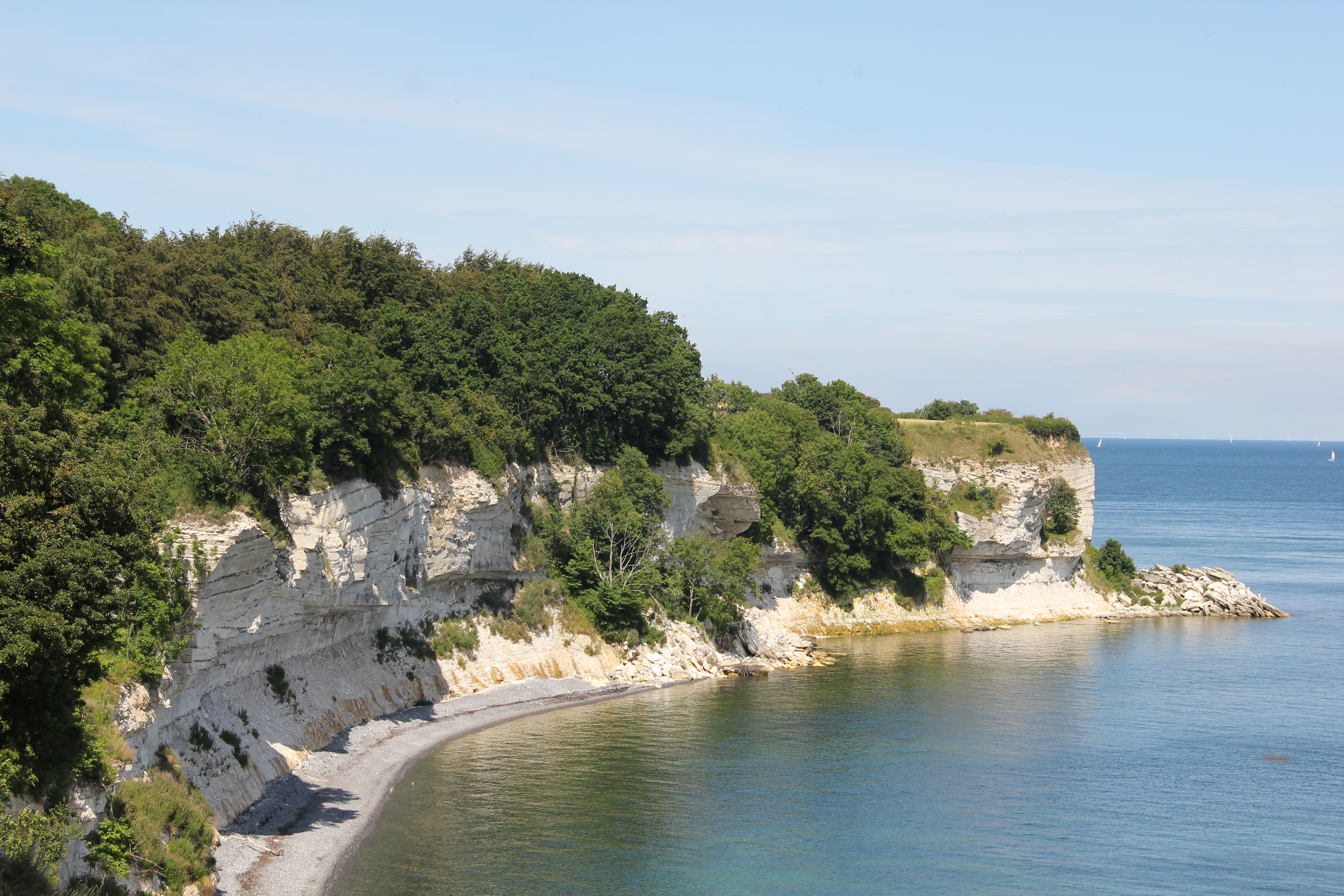
Stevns Klint

Stevns Peninsula is a peninsula on Zealand in Denmark. It is separated from Zealand by the three streams Stevns Å, Tryggevælde Å and Kildeå.

The main town of the peninsula is Store Heddinge, and most of the peninsula is covered by the Stevns Municipality.

Stevns is best known for Stevns Klint, a white chalk cliff stretching 17 km (11 mi) along the coast.

== See also ==
- List of peninsulas
- Tryggevælde
