= Store Heddinge =

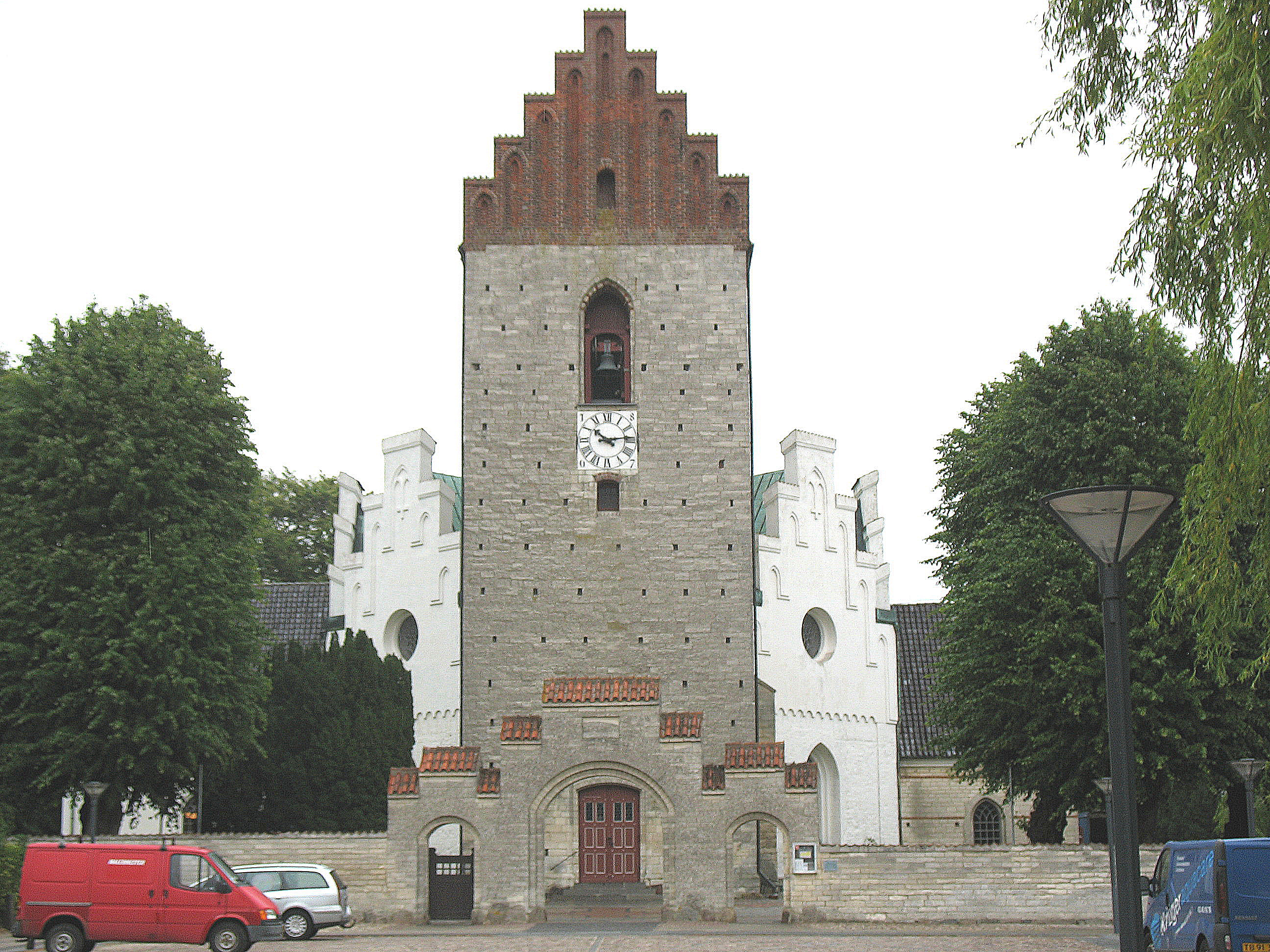
- The church of Sankt Katharina

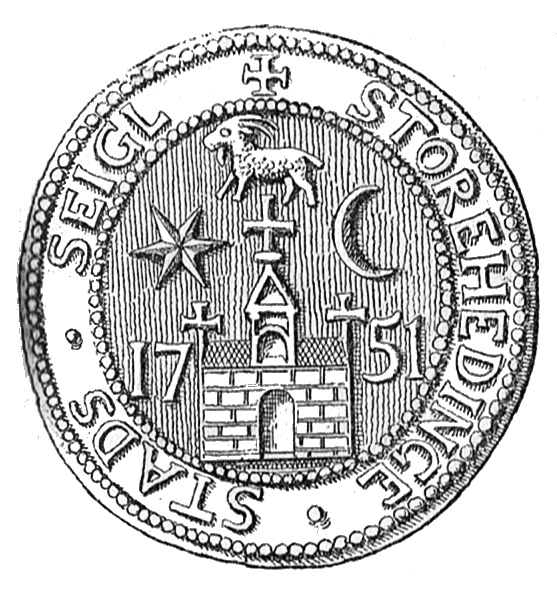
- Seal Coat of arms

- Location in Denmark Location in Region Zealand
- Coordinates: 55.30893°N 12.38726°E
- Country: Denmark
- Region: Zealand (Sjælland)
- Municipality: Stevns

Government
  - Mayor: Poul Arne Nielsen

Area
  - Urban: 2.3 km^{2} (0.89 sq mi)
  - Municipality: 250.19 km^{2} (96.60 sq mi)

Population (2026)
  - Urban: 3,690
  - Urban density: 1,600/km^{2} (4,200/sq mi)
- Time zone: UTC+1 (Central Europe Time)
  - Summer (DST): UTC+2

Store Heddinge is a Danish town in Region Sjælland. It is the administrative seat of Stevns Municipality, and has a population of 3,690 (1 January 2026).

== Geography ==
The town is situated in the eastern side of Denmark, on the Stevns Peninsula.

== History ==
The town came into existence during the 13th century, and Saint Katharina Church (Sct. Katharina kirke) is also from that time. The town received privileged status as a merchant town in 1441. A Latin preparatory school was founded in the town in 1620, but was closed down in 1739.

The assembly house (Danish, tinghuset) in Store Heddinge was built around 1838 on the newly built Nytorv plaza as a combination town hall, assembly hall, and jail. It was built by architect Jørgen Hansen Koch, who was Director for the Royal Danish Academy of Art (Det Kongelige Danske Kunstakademi).

The water tower is from 1912 and is made of limestone, from nearby Stevns Klint, and red brick.

== Transport ==
Store Heddinge is served by Store Heddinge railway station located on the East Line which connects the town with Køge and the rest of the Danish rail network.

== Photogallery ==
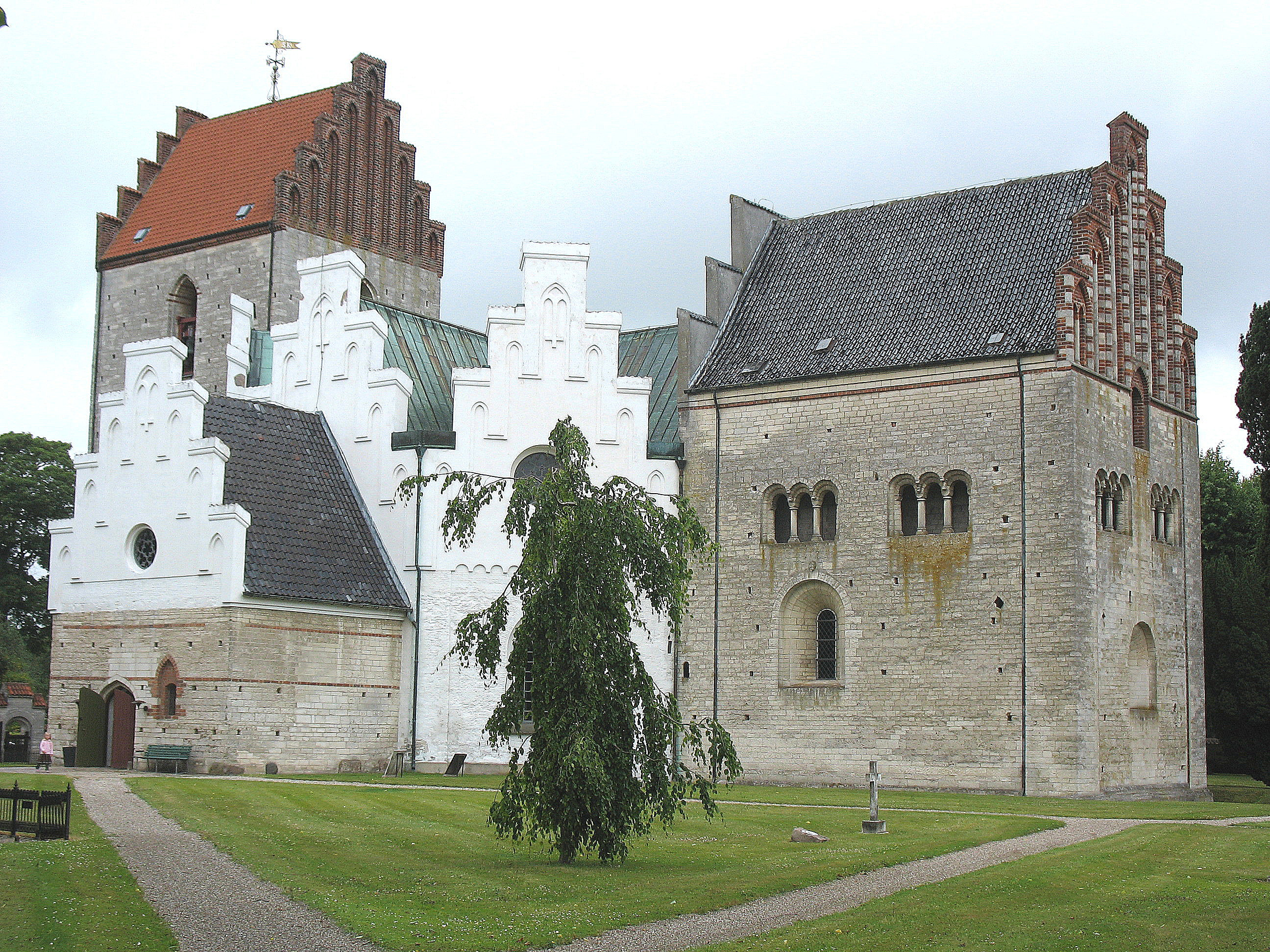
Sankt Katharina Church

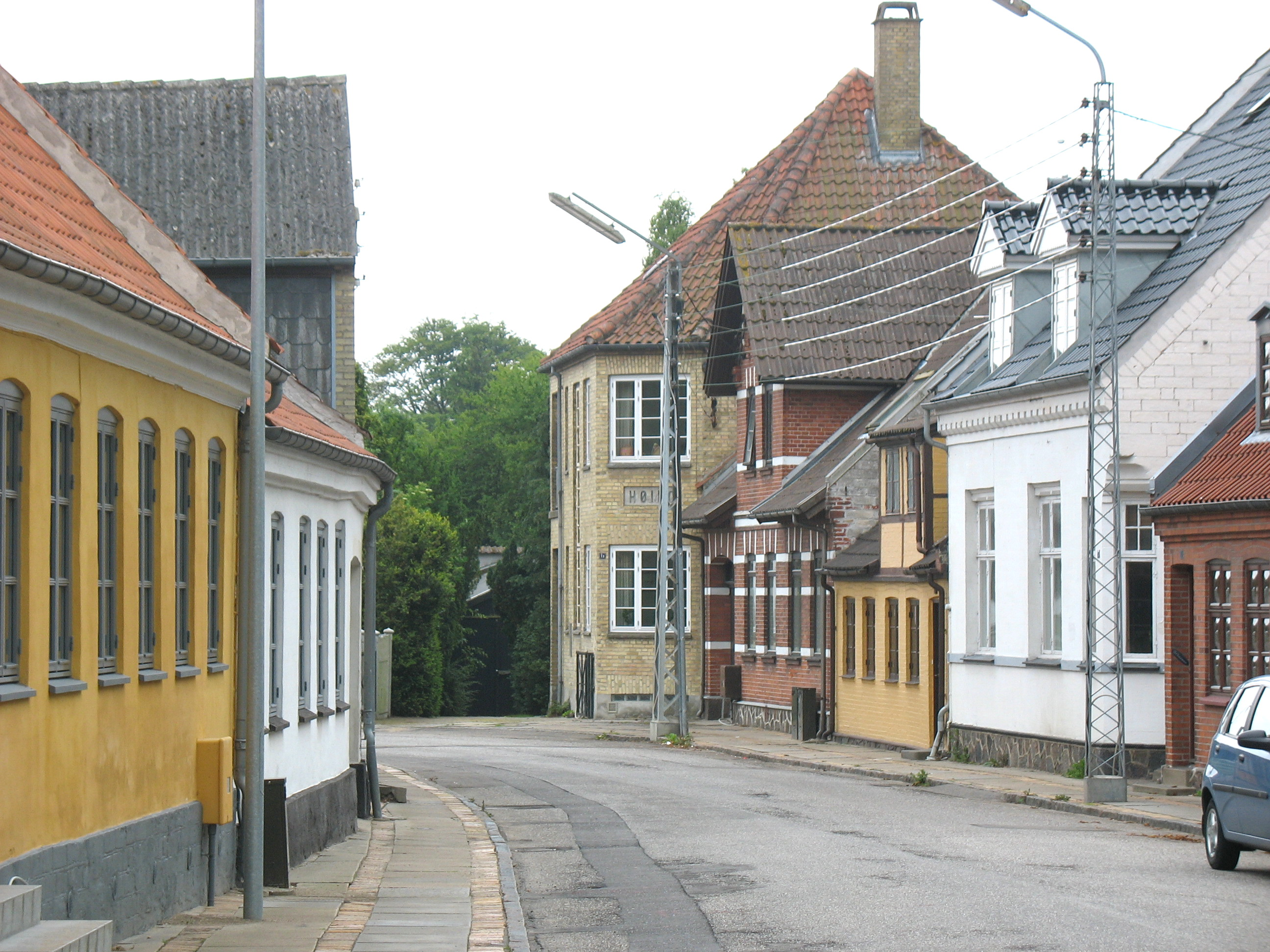
Old town

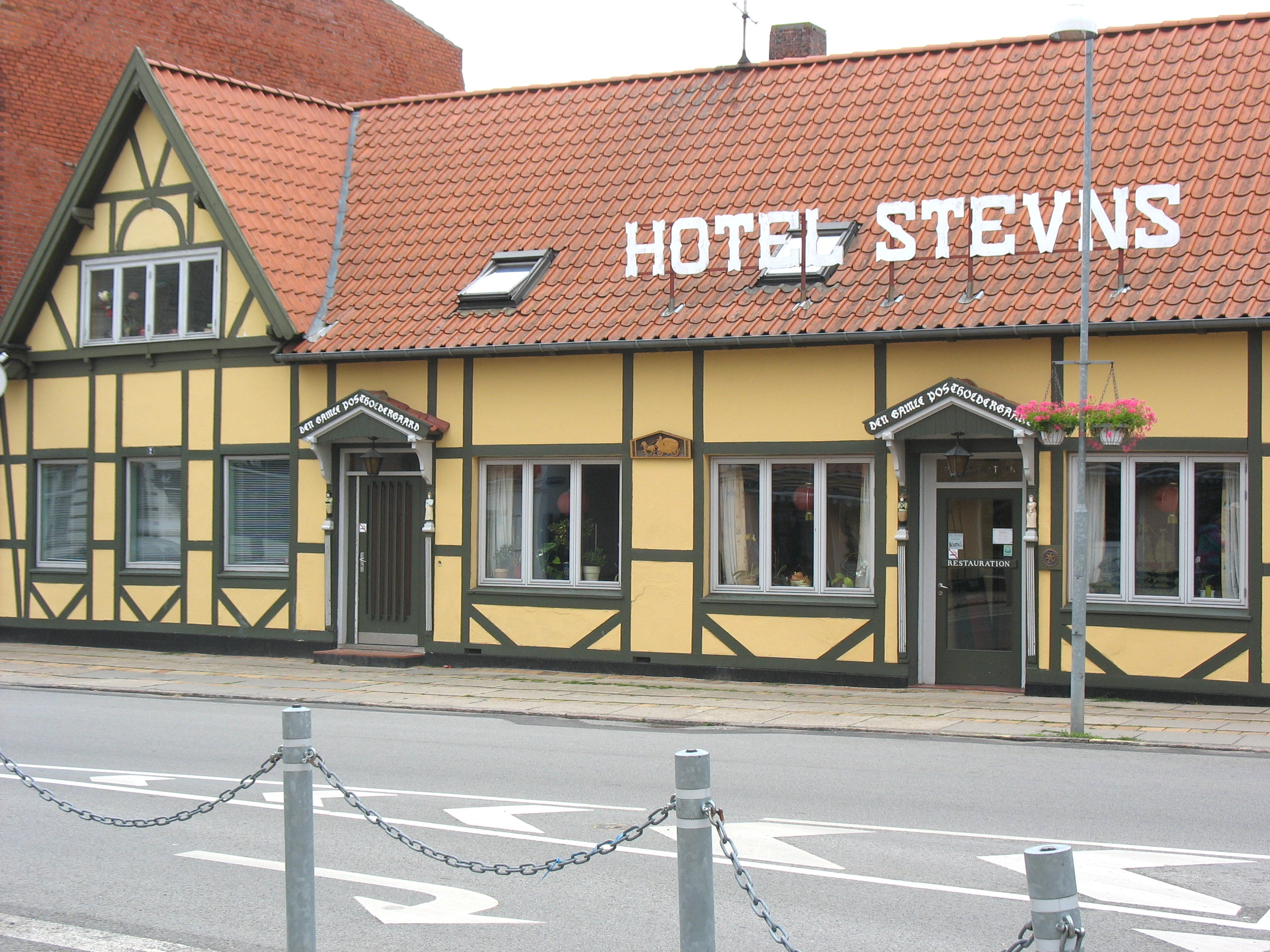
Hotel Stevns

== Notable people ==
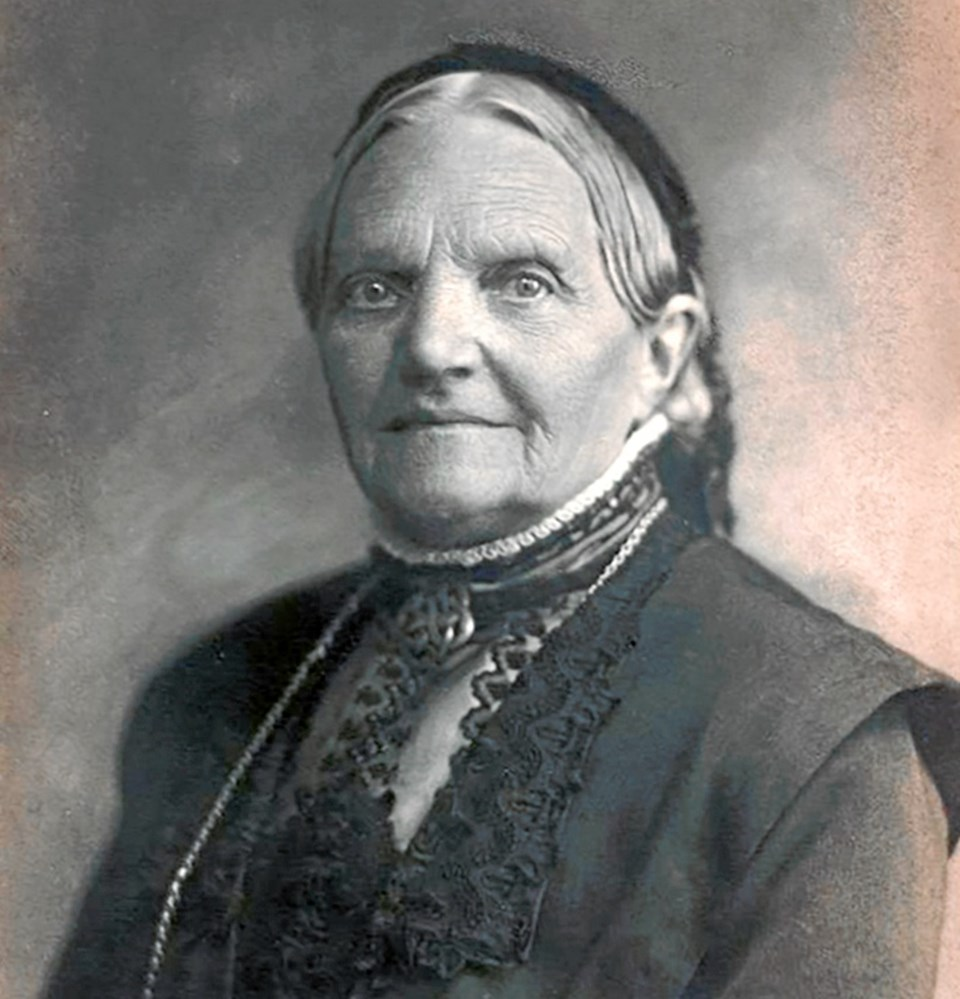
Jutta Bojsen-Møller

- Carl Otto Reventlow (1817 in Store Heddinge - 1873) notable as the developer of a mnemonic system
- Jutta Bojsen-Møller (1837 in Store Heddinge – 1927) a high school proponent, a women's rights activist
- Jan B. Poulsen (born 1946 in Store Heddinge) a Danish football manager, 155 games with Boldklubben Frem
- Søren Ulrik Thomsen (born 1956) a Danish poet, went to school and brought up in Store Heddinge
- Jens Fink-Jensen (born 1956) a Danish poet, author, photographer, composer and architect, went to school and brought up in Store Heddinge
