= List of churches in Faxe Municipality =

1: Øde Førslev 2: Terslev 3: Tureby 4: Teestrup 5: Haslev 6: Freerslev 7: Sønder Dalby 8: Karise 9: Bråby 10: Ulse 11: Øster Egede 12: Alslev 13: Spjellerup 14: Smerup 15: Vester Egede 16: Kongsted 17: Faxe 18: Hylleholt 19: Vemmetofte 20: Roholte

This list of churches in Faxe Municipality lists church buildings in Faxe Municipality, Denmark. The municipality is located on the southeastern part of Zealand.

== Overview ==
Faxe Municipality belongs to the Diocese of Roskilde, a diocese within the Evangelical Lutheran Church of Denmark. It is divided into 20 parishes.

== List ==
Name	Location	Year	Coordinates	Image	Refs
Alslev Church	Alslev	c. 1200	55°17′24.36″N 12°12′10.79″E		
Bråby Church	Bråby	12th century	55°17′50.99″N 11°56′40.91″E		
Dalby Church	Sønder-Dalby, Dalby	14th century	55°18′42″N 12°03′49″E		
Faxe Church	Faxe	14th century	55°15′20″N 12°07′12″E		
Freerslev Church	Freerslev	c. 1200	55°17′24.36″N 12°12′10.79″E		
Haslev Church	Haslev	c. 1100	55°19′23″N 11°57′49″E		
Hylleholt Church	Faxe Ladeplads	1878	55°13′12″N 12°09′53″E		
Ingelstrup Chapel	Ingelstrup	1892	55°22′1.78″N 12°02′12.31″E		
Karise Church	Karise	1261	55°18′33.32″N 12°12′12.31″E		
Kongsted Church	Rønnede	c. 1425	55°14′50.28″N 12°02′22.91″E		
Roholte Church	Roholte	1441	55°11′44.3″N 12°05′27.1″E		
Smerup Church	Smerup	c. 100	55°17′1.32″N 12°13′53.04″E		
Spjellerup Church	Spjellerip	c. 1100	55°16′24.96″N 12°13′35.75″E		
Teestrup Church	Teestrup	c. 1100	55°19′48.36″N 11°53′3.47″E		
Terslev Church	Terslev	c. 1100	55°22′32.87″N 11°57′50.76″E		
Tureby Church	Tureby	c. 1100	55°20′48.23″N 12°05′25.02″E		
Ulse Church	Ulse	c. 1100	55°17′34.07″N 12°00′44.99″E		
Vemmetofte Klosterkirke ( Monastery church ), Vemmetofte Monastery	Vemmetofte	c. 1100	55°19′25″N 12°13′33.09″E		
Vemmetofte Chapel	Vemmetofte	c. 1100	55°19′25″N 12°13′33.09″E		
Vester Egede Church	Vester Egede	c. 1100	55°15′57.24″N 11°57′45.71″E		
Øde Førslev Church	Førslev	c. 1100	55°21′29.16″N 11°54′17.63″E		
Øster Egede Church	Øster Egede	c. 1100	55°16′50.24″N 12°05′30.09″E		

== See also ==
- List of churches in Vordingborg Municipality
