= Cavalry School =

Cavalry School may refer to:

- École de cavalerie, Saumur, a French military training establishment at Saumur in western France
- Rytterskole (Danish for 'cavalry school'), an 18th-century Danish type of school for children in cavalry districts
- United States Army Cavalry School, a training establishment of the United States Army
