= Louise Bjørnsen =

Danish novelist

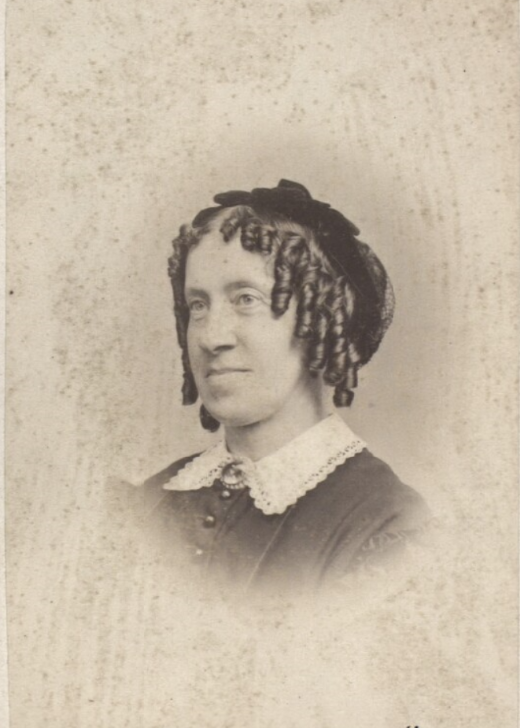
Louise Bjørnsen photographed by Ludvig Grundtvig

Louise Cathrine Elisabeth Bjørnsen, pen name Elisabeth Martens, (1824–1899) was successful as an early Danish female novelist and short story writer. Following in the footsteps of Mathilde Fibiger, she published her first novel Hvad er Livet? (What is Life?) in 1855, based on her own experiences as a governess. She went on to write five more novels and four collections of short stories.

== Biography ==
Born on 9 April 1824 in Roholte near Faxe, Louise Cathrine Elisabeth Bjørnsen was the daughter of the parish priest Frederik Cornelius Eberhard Bjørnsen (1781–1831) and his wife Rebekka Adolphine née Rabe-Holm (1786–1858). After her father died when she was eight years old, she was brought up by her mother together with her eight siblings. Her mother also introduced her to romantic literature. Bjørnsen was inspired to write a novel based on her own experiences when Fibiger's Clara Raphael: Tolv Breve was published in 1851. Now living with her family in Næstved, she embarked on her novel Hvad er Livet?, mainly writing secretly at night. Using the pen name Elisabeth Martens, she finally found a publisher who brought out the first edition in 1855, shortly followed by a reprint.

Later publications included En Kvinde (A Woman, 1860), Tre Fortællinger (Three Short Stories, 1866), Hvad behøves der for at leve? (What is needed in order to live? Portraits, 1869), Sangerinden (The Songstress, 1876), Fra Fortid og Nutid, en Samling Fortællinger (From the Past and Present, a Collection of Short Stories, 1878) and Skibldner (1883). She also contributed to journals and magazines. In all these works, she deals with conflicts experienced by emancipated women, presenting both the traditional and the more modern options for women of her day. Her works evoke the dreams and disappointments experienced by women who have confronted life, work and romance on their own. Her To Søstre (Two Sisters, 1890) deals with the evolving Danish Women's Society but takes a rather conservative approach. As a result, the book was not very well received.

Following her mother's death in 1858, Louise Bjørnsen spent her later years in Copenhagen where she died on 27 December 1899.
