= Alslevgaard =

Danish manor house

- Interactive map of the Alslevgaard area

General information
- Architectural style: Rococo
- Location: Køgevej 30; 4653 Karise, Denmark
- Coordinates: 55°17′01″N 12°10′38″E
- Completed: 1902

Design and construction
- Architect: Niels Eigtved

Alslevgaard is a manor house and estate located at Karise, Faxe Municipality, Denmark. The estate was for 300 years owned by the Grubbe family and has for long periods of time shared ownership with Tryggevælde. Both estates belonged to the Countship of Bregentved from 1751 to 1922 under grevskabet Bregentved, der blev oprettet af A. G. Moltke. The old main building was demolished in the middle of the 18th century and a new main building was not built until 1902. The oldest parts of the farm buildings (avlsgården) dates from circa 1775.

== History ==
=== Grubbe and Urne families ===
The first known owner of Alslevgaard was Bo Jensen Grubbe who was the owner in around 1328. He died on the way back from the Holy Land in 1349 and the estate was then passed to his sons Bent, Jon and Esbern Grubbe. It remained in the hands of members of the Grubbe family for almost 300 years.

Alslevgaard was in the beginning of the 17th century by marriage transferred to Knud Urne. It stayed in the hands of the Urne family until 1653.

=== Changing owners ===
Margrethe Eilersdatter Grubbe, who had been given Alslevgaard by her brother, transferred the estate to the Urne family through her marriage to Knud Urne.

In 1653, Alslevgaard was sold to Knud Ulfeldt. His daughter-in-law, Sophie Amalie Krag, brought Alselvgaard into her second marriage to Otto Rantzau. He sold it to Christen Skeel in 1698. Skeel was the following year given royal permission to turn the land into tenant farms and place them under Tryggevælde. Skeel died in 1709 but it is not clear who inherited the estate. Peder Benzon acquired Tryggevælde in 1716 but already in 1718 ceded it to Frederick IV in exchange for Vibygård and the land was then included in Tryggevælde Cavalry District. Tryggevælde Cacalry District was later sold in public auction by Frederick V. Alslevgaard and Rryggevælde were sold to Peter Neergaard.

=== 1751–1922: Moltke family ===
In 1751, he sold them to ]Adam Gottlob Moltke. Moltke did not merge the land with the Countship of Bregentved but reestablished Alslevgaard as an independent manor.

=== 1922–present: Later history ===
In 1922, Frederik Christian Moltke ceded Alslevgaard to Statens Jordlovsudvalg as part of the fee that lensafløsningslpven (Fief Dissolution Act( had required him to pay. Part of the land had prior to that been converted into three other smallholdings. Statens Jordlovsudvalg sold Alslevgaard to Johan Viggo Selchau-Hansen in 1924.

== List of owners ==
- (1328-1349) Bo Jensen Grubbe
- (1349- ) Bent Grubbe
- (1349- ) Jon Grubbe
- (1349- ) Esben Grubbe
- (1386- ) Evert Grubbe
- ( - ) Peder Grubbe
- ( -1479) Evert Grubbe
- (1479-1503) Niels Grubbe
- (1503-1516) Arvinger efter Niels Grubbe
- (1503-1516) Laurids Grubbe den ældre
- (1516-1561) Laurids Grubbe den yngre
- (1561-1600) Knud Grubbe
- (1600-1602) Hilleborg Grubbe, gift Grubbe
- (1602- ) Sivert Grubbe
- ( -1622 ) Knud Urne
- (1622-1624) Margrethe Grubbe, gift Urne
- (1624)Frederik Urne
- (1624-1642) Jørgen Knudsen Urne
- (1642- ) Christian Urne
- (1642-1653) Otte Urne
- (1653-1657) Knud Ulfeldt
- (1657-1670) Christoffer Ulfeldt
- (1670- ) Sophie Amalie Krag, gift 1) Ulfeldt, 2) Rantzau
- ( -1698) Otto Rantzau
- (1698-1709) Christen Skeel
- (1709-1716) Arvinger efter Christen Skeel
- (1716-1718) Peder Benzon
- (1718-1747) Kronen
- (1747-1751) Peter Johansen Neergaard
- (1751-1792) Adam Gottlob Moltke
- (1792-1818) Joachim Godske Moltke
- (1818-1864) August Adam Wilhelm Moltke
- (1864-1875) Frederik Georg Julius Moltke
- (1875-1922) Frederik Christian Moltke
- (1922-1924) Statens Jordlovsudvalg
- (1924-1943) Viggo Selchau-Hansen
- (1943-1972) Knud Christian Selchau-Hansen
- (1972-1979) Kirsten Selchau-Hansen
- (1979-present) Carsten J. Boserup
