= Malthe Engelsted =

Danish painter (1852–1930)

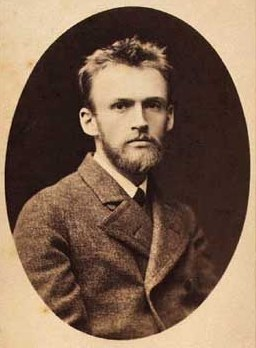
Malthe Engelsted in 1876, by the photographer N.E. Sinding.

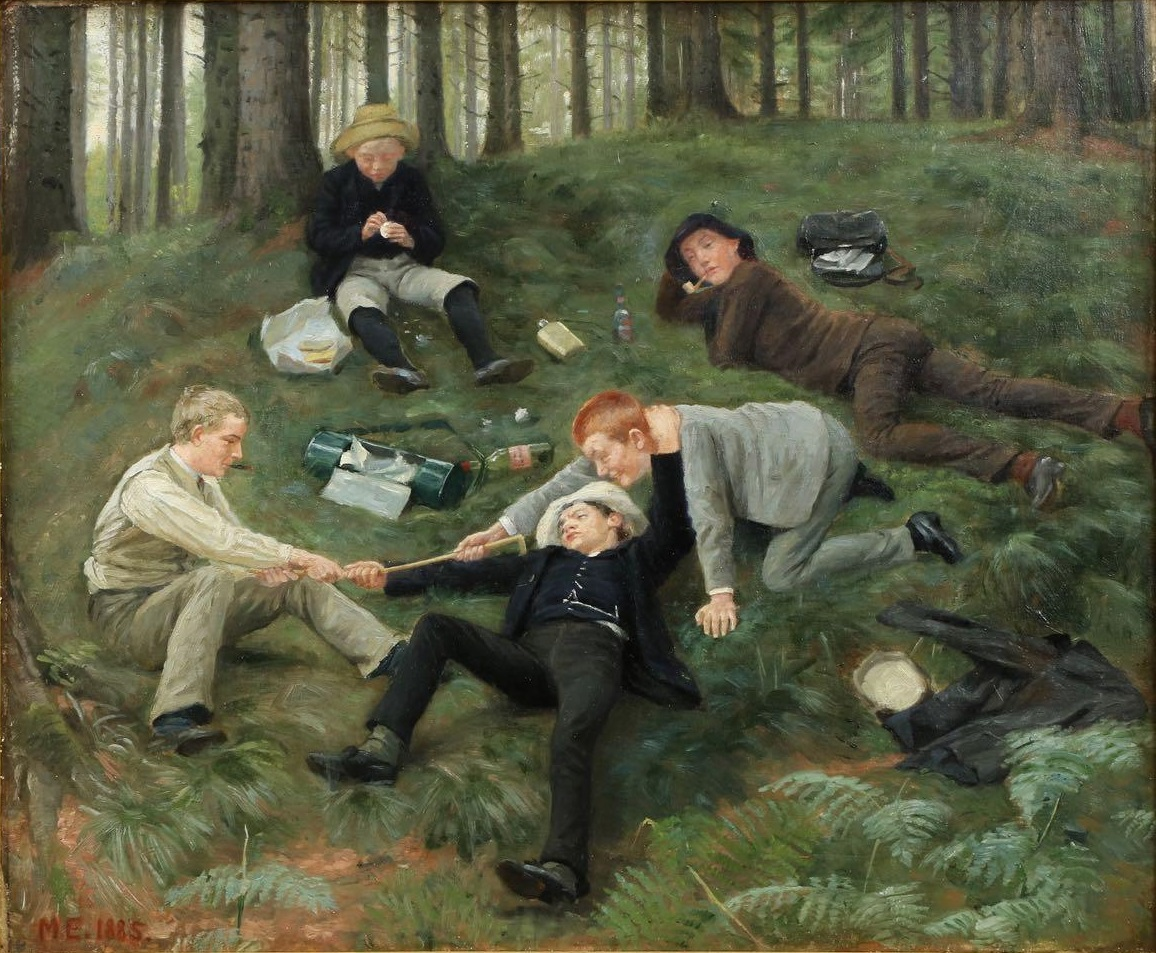
Afternoon Frolic

Malthe Odin Engelsted (born Malta Odin on 8 August 1852 in Nivågård, Sjælland - 21 December 1930 in Faxe Ladeplads) was a Danish M.A. and painter.

== Biography ==
His father, Niels Engelsted was a military officer. In 1870, having studied theology for 3 years, he began attending the Royal Danish Academy of Fine Arts, where he studied etching from 1873 to 1879. His first showing was at the Charlottenborg Spring Exhibition in 1880.

He was awarded the Neuhausenske Prize in 1883. Combining his own resources with a scholarship from the academy, he was able to make study tours to Germany, the Netherlands, Belgium, France, Italy and Greece; spending most of the years 1887–1889 in travelling.

Much of his work is infused with humor, exemplified by Domino Players (1881) and L’hombre (1887), but he also created canvases of a more serious, psychological nature, such as Sara awakens Isaac for his departure to Mount Moriah (1884) or Christ and Nicodemus (1887).

He is buried in the cemetery at Faxe Church.

== Sources ==
- H.R. Baumann, biography, in the first version of the DBL, published by CF Bricka, Volume 4, p. 521, Penguin Books, 1887–1905.
- A translation of the corresponding article in the Danish Wikipedia.
