= Godtfred Olsen =

Danish cyclist

Personal information
- Born: 22 July 1883 Roholte, Fakse municipality, Denmark
- Died: 21 June 1954 (aged 70) Frederiksberg, Denmark

Cycling career
- Sport: Cycling

Godtfred Hegelund Olsen (22 July 1883 – 21 June 1954) was a Danish road racing cyclist who competed in the 1912 Summer Olympics. He was born in Roholte, Fakse municipality and died in Frederiksberg.

In 1912, he was a member of the Danish cycling team, which finished eighth in the team time trial event. In the individual time trial competition he finished 53rd.
