= Vester Egede Church =

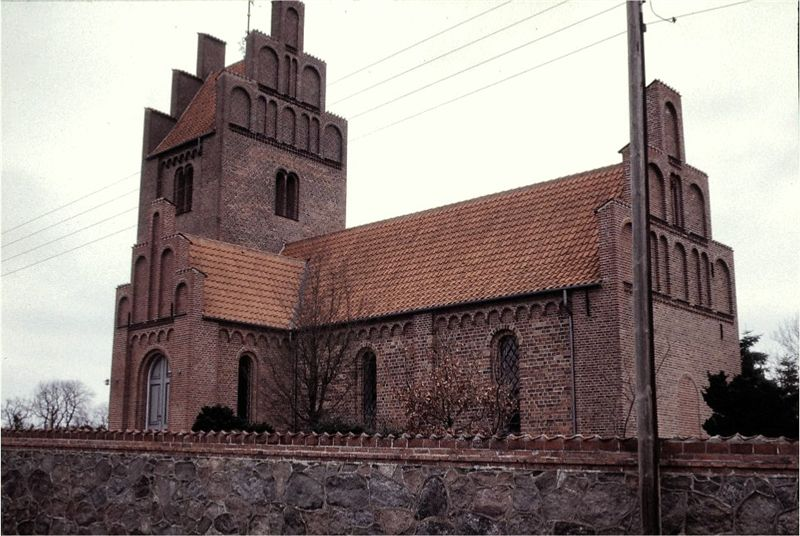
- Vester Egede Church

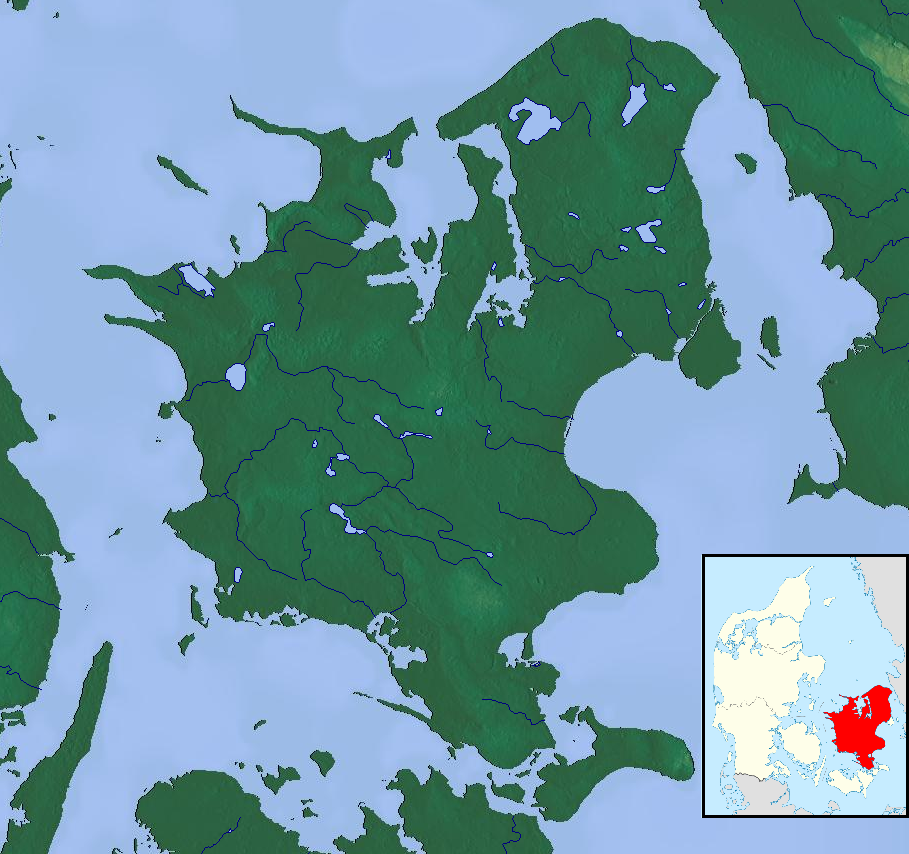
- Vester Egede Church in Zealand
- 55°15′57″N 11°57′46″E
- Denomination: Church of Denmark

History
- Dedication: Evangelical Lutheran

Vester Egede Church (Danish: Vester Egede Kirke) is a Danish parish church in the Diocese of Roskilde, Faxe Municipality in Region Sjælland on the island of Zealand. It is located some 10 km (6.2 mi) due west of Faxe. Today's building dates from 1876 although there is evidence of an earlier church on the site, probably built during the Romanesque period.

== History and architecture ==
The earliest documented reference to the church is from around 1370 in the Bishop of Roskilde's Taxation Book. A letter from 1672 bestowed ownership of the church on Hans Schack. A royal resolution of 1689 further granted ownership to Schack's descendants as long as the nearby estate of Gisselfeld remained in their possession. The church came into independent ownership in 1914.

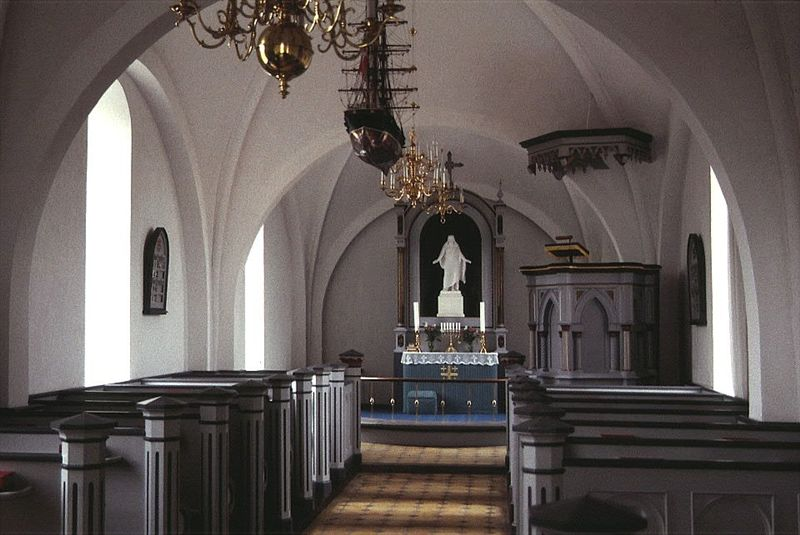
The interior

The original nave with a porch and tower was completely rebuilt by the architect Theodor Zeltner in 1876. The most obvious evidence of earlier Romanesque origin is the font. A tower at the western end of the church was built during the Gothic period as evidenced by its foundations. During reconstruction, the nave was extended 12 feet (3.7 m) to the east and its height was also increased. The building now stands with undecorated walls and a tiled roof. Inside, both the old and new masonry has been plastered.

== Interior ==
The cross vault dates from the reconstruction in 1876. The pulpit is from 1863. The altarpiece from 1859 contains a plaster cast of Bertel Thorvaldsen's Christ. On the north wall of the tower room hangs a consecration cross from the Middle Ages. The granite font is probably from the Romanesque period. It displays a relief of "Luxuria", a woman standing on her head, nurturing a winged dragon and a lion.

== Churchuard ==
Notable burials in the churchyard include the writer Herluf Krabbe (1904–1976).

== See also ==
- Faxe Municipality
- List of churches in Faxe Municipality
