= Evert Grubbe =

Danish nobleman

Evert Grubbe (died after 10 August 1492) was a Danish nobleman who served as Chancellor of the Realm from 1473 to 1486.

== Biography ==
Grubbe was the son of Peder Grubbe of Alslev and Anne Sivertsdatter Blaa (died 1492 or later.).He is first mentioned in 1463 and was by then the owner of Alslev. He was from 1470 or earlier to 1490 or later lensmann of Tryggevælde. He also owned a house in Køge. He served as Chancellor of the Realm from 1473 to 1486. He was privy councillor from at least 1477 but was never knighted. He served as principal of the Priory of Our Lady in Toskilde at the time of his death. Alslev had well before his death been passed on to his brother, Niels Grubbe, who was the progenitor of the younger part of the family. He was married to Gertrud Pedersdatter (still alive on 27 June 1496). She succeeded him as principal of the Priory of Our Lady.
