= Roholte =

- Village and parish
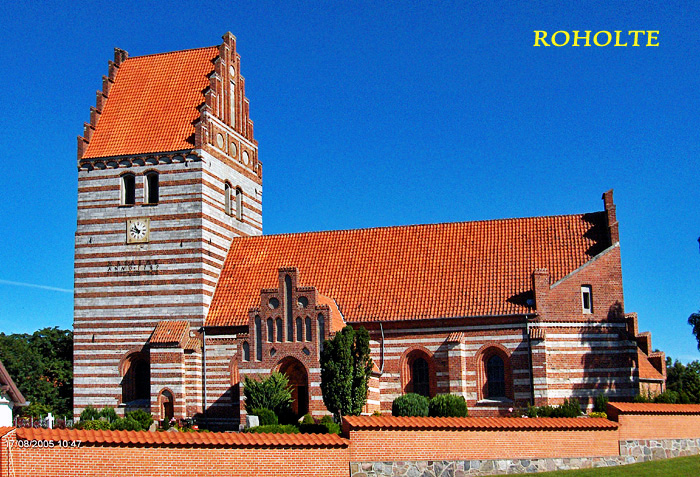
- Roholte Church

- Parish location in Faxe Municipality

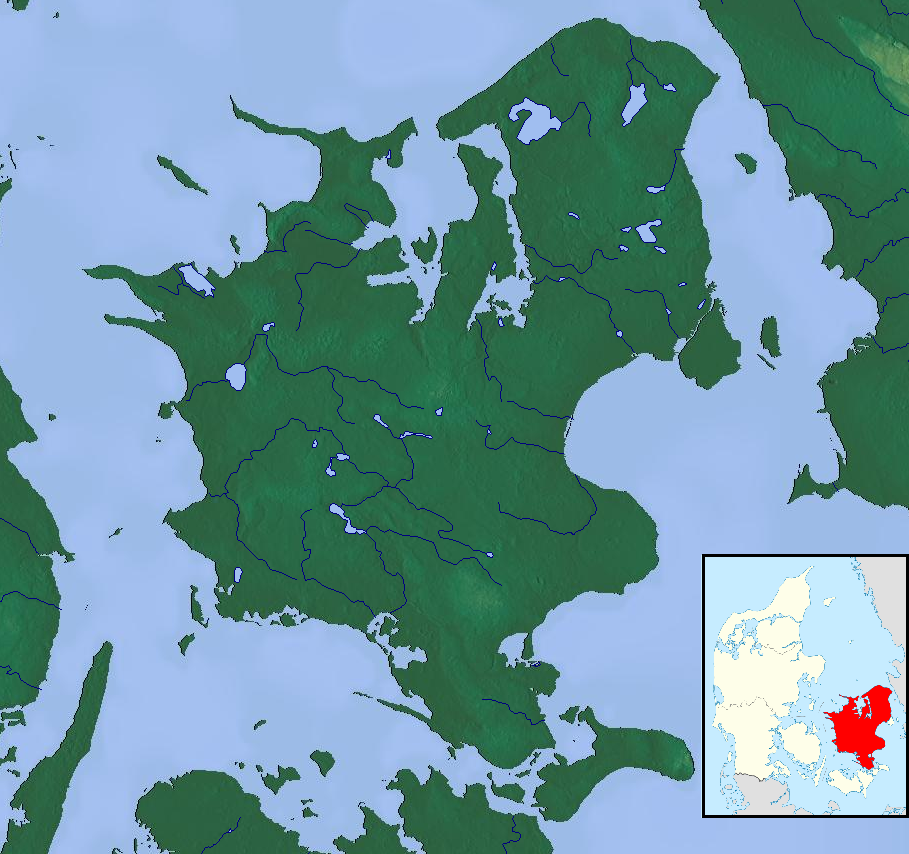
- Village location in Region Zealand
- Coordinates: 55°11′44″N 12°05′26″E
- Country: Denmark
- Region: Region Zealand
- Municipality: Faxe
- Time zone: UTC+1 (CET)
  - Summer (DST): UTC+2 (CEST)

Roholte is a village and parish in Faxe Municipality, Region Zealand, Denmark. By road it is located 10.5 kilometres (6.5 mi) south of Faxe, and 83.2 kilometres (51.7 mi) southwest of Copenhagen. Of note is Roholte Church, the parish church, which was built in 1441, and the Morten Roholte sports club.

== History ==
The area around Roholte has been inhabited since the Stone Age. There is also evidence of a Viking community there. The origin of the village can be ascribed to the establishment of a large trading post just south of Roholte's present location. As the height of the land in the area increased, the sea retreated while trade gave way to agriculture and forestry.

"The Society for Improvement of Cattle Breeding in Roholte Parish" was founded in 1884; the Royal Veterinary and Agricultural College noted it to be the first "Bull Club" or breeding society in Denmark. The society was formed by 36 farmers who purchased a superior quality bull to breed with the members' cows.

== Notable people ==
- Louise Bjørnsen (1824 in Roholte - 1899) an early Danish female novelist and short story writer.
- Karl Gjellerup (1857–1919) a Danish poet, awarded the Nobel Prize in Literature in 1917, was born at Roholte's rectory
- Godtfred Olsen (1883 in Roholte – 1954) a Danish road racing cyclist who competed in the 1912 Summer Olympics
- Hans Olsen (1885 in Roholte – 1969) a Danish cyclist, competed in two events at the 1912 Summer Olympics

== Cityscape ==
The sites of the houses in the village have varied over the years. Initially they were situated close together but after many were destroyed by fire, the trend was to separate them out over the nearby countryside. However, after a number of burglaries, they again became more closely grouped around the centre of the village as they stand today. Roholte has therefore become a village of high historical interest with its carefully placed houses and farmsteads.

== Notable buildings ==
Roholte Church

The church was built in 1441 in a decorative Late Gothic style with ribbed gables and horizontal belts of limestone and brick along the walls of the nave and around the tower. Its major attraction is the font which was originally intended for Roskilde Cathedral. Its 15 panels depict angels and the apostles in shallow reliefs.

Old school

In 1908, a school building large enough to accommodate the increasing number of children in the village and its surroundings was completed. It was built in a style similar to that of the adjacent church. It was taken out of commission in the early 1980s as there were not enough pupils to warrant its existence. Recently, however, the cultural authorities have been discussing a proposal to give the school the status of a heritage-listed building in view of its local history and its architecture, probably the work of Jens Ingwersen, especially as it is built in brick and limestone reflecting the features of the church which stands opposite.
