= Terslev =

- Village
- Location in Region Zealand Terslev (Denmark)
- Coordinates: 55°22′31″N 11°58′6″E
- Country: Denmark
- Region: Region Zealand
- Municipality: Faxe Municipality

Population (2026)
  - Total: 921

Terslev is a village, with a population of 921 (1 January 2026), in Region Zealand in Denmark. It is located 7 km north of Haslev just south of the tripoint between the municipalities of Køge, Ringsted and Faxe.

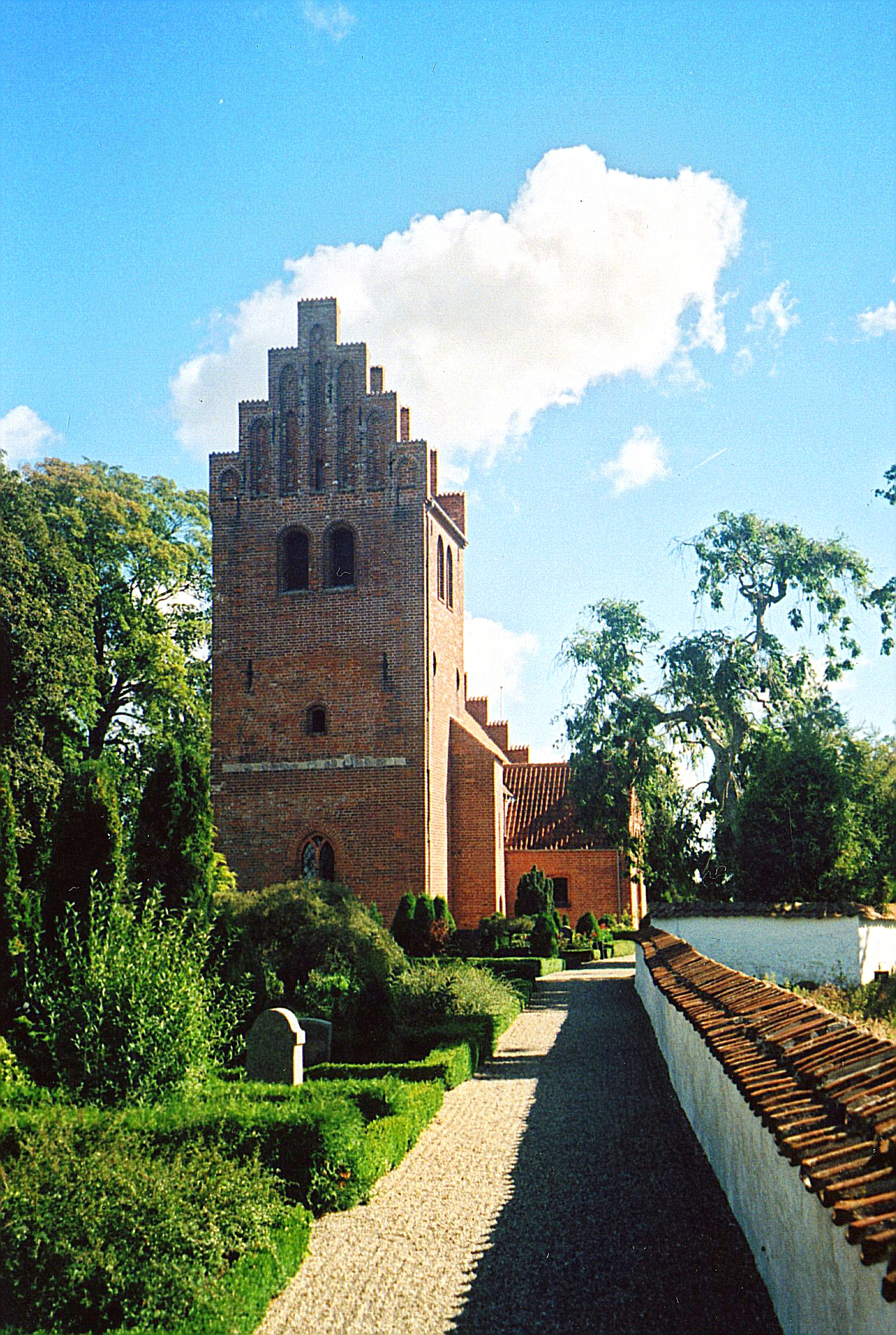
Terslev Church

Terslev Church dates back to the 12th century and is one of the oldest churches in Denmark. The church was restored by architects Johannes and Inger Exner in 1978–79.

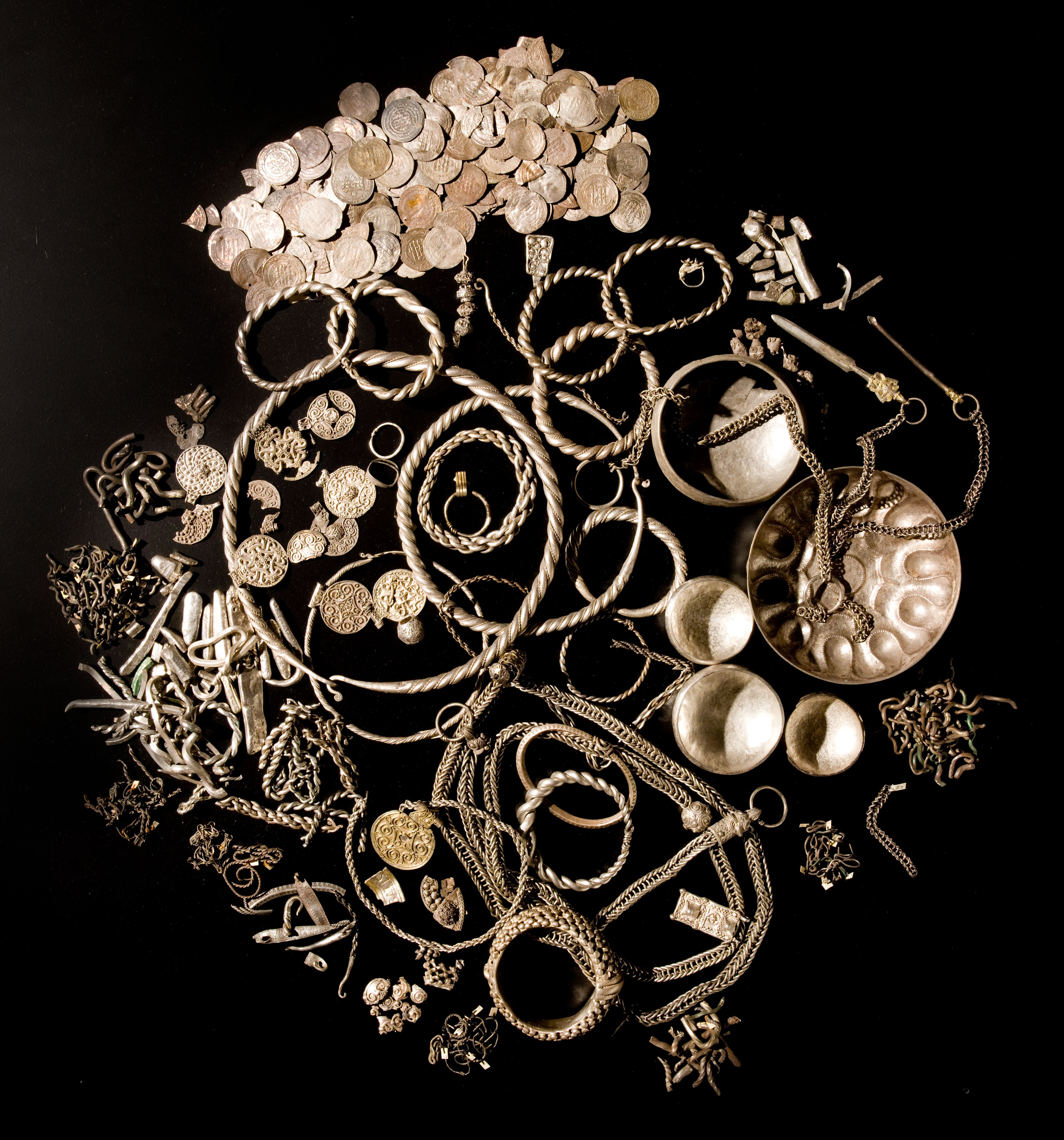
The silver treasure from Terslev

In 1911, when some boys were digging up a garden in Terslev, they came across a silver treasure, of mostly Arab and Persian origin, from the Viking Age.
