= Hans Olsen (cyclist) =

Danish cyclist

Personal information
- Born: 1 January 1885 Roholte, Denmark
- Died: 4 December 1969 (aged 84)

Cycling career
- Sport: Cycling

Hans Olsen (1 January 1885 – 4 December 1969) was a Danish cyclist. He competed in two events at the 1912 Summer Olympics.
