= Rytterskole =

Type of school in Denmark

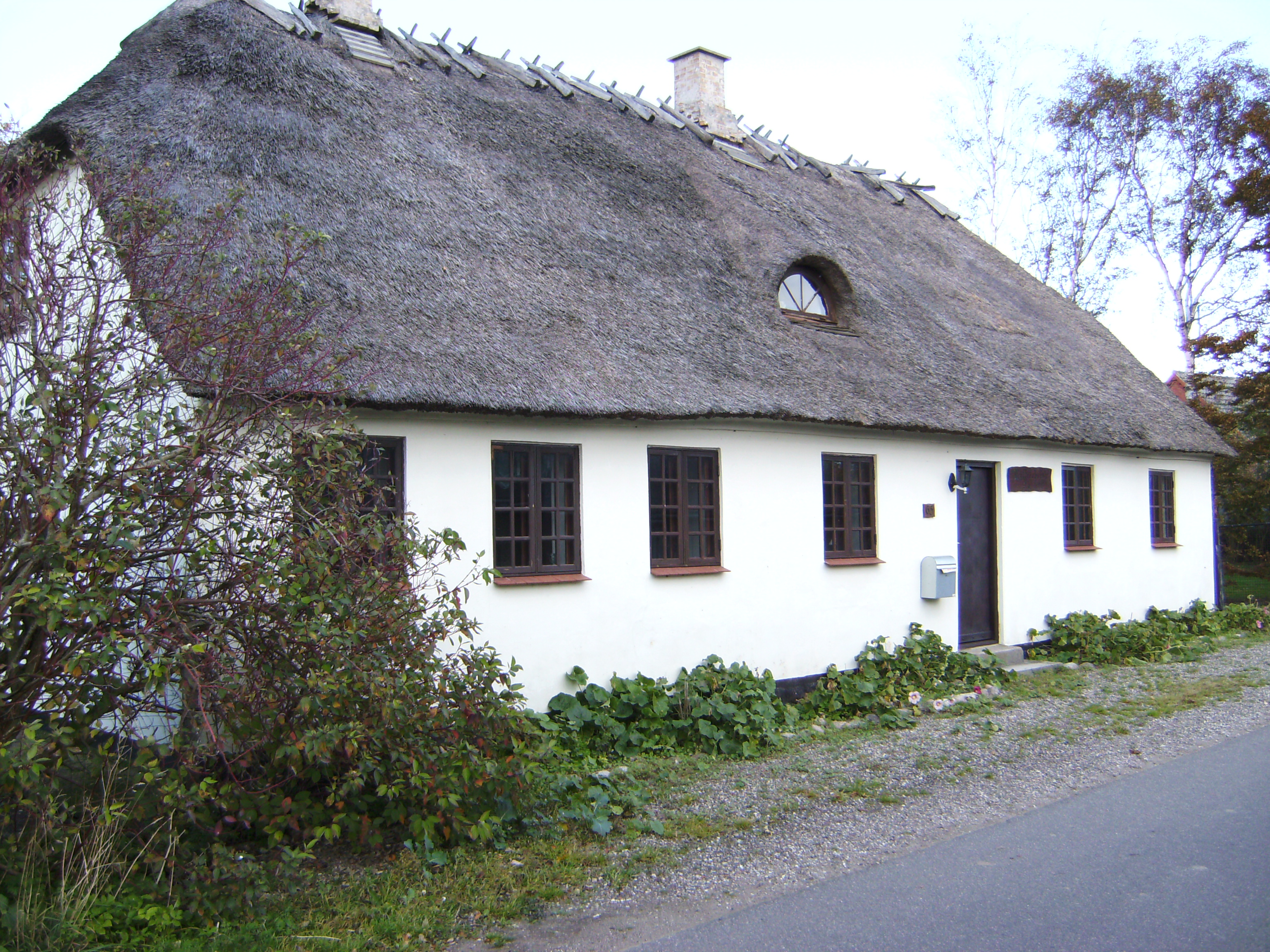
Rytterskole

A rytterskole (English: rider school or cavalry school) was a type of school erected in Denmark in the years 1721–1727 for the education of common children. The schools were located in 12 cavalry districts established in 1715–1718, during the Great Nordic War, to reform and improve the cavalry in Denmark, from which the schools got their name. They were not military schools, as the name might suggest, but rather a predecessor to the Danish public schools founded in 1814.

The 12 districts were Copenhagen, Frederiksborg, Kronborg, Antvorskov, Tryggevælde, Vordingborg, Kolding, Dronningborg, Skanderborg, Falster, Lolland and Fyn. Each of these was meant to host 20 schools, making for 240 in all; however, some districts received more than 20 and some less, although the total still numbered 240. A 13th district was established on Møn in 1726, and a 241st school was built on Bogø in 1727.
