= Smerup =

Smerup, Denmark
- Village
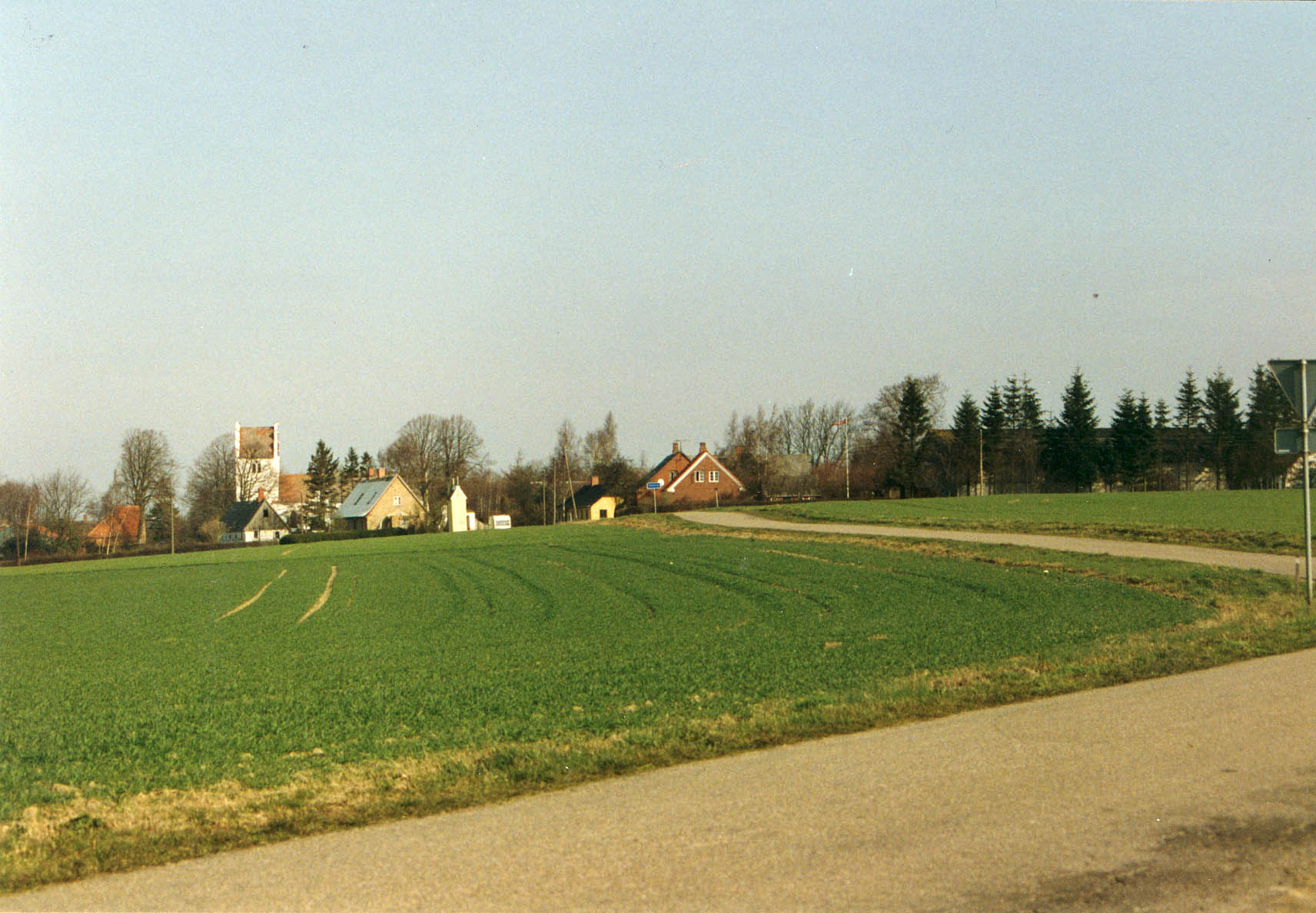
- Smerup seen from the south ~1995

- The location of Smerup in Denmark
- Coordinates: 55°16′59″N 12°14′1″E
- Country: Denmark
- Region: Region Sjælland
- Municipality: Faxe Municipality

Area
  - Total: 0.1 km^{2} (0.039 sq mi)
  - Water: 0.00045 km^{2} (0.00017 sq mi)

Population
  - Total: 80
  - Density: 800/km^{2} (2,100/sq mi)
- Time zone: UTC+1 (CET)
  - Summer (DST): UTC+2 (CEST)
- Postal code: 4653

Smerup is a village in the southern part of Stevns, a peninsula of the Island Sjælland in Denmark, Europe. The village is centered on a church (built around year 1270) and a village pond. The village is situated between the cities Faxe and Store Heddinge. The distance to the city Køge is 25 km. Smerup is parish-of-ease to the neighboring village Store Spjellerup, but is itself church city for the larger neighboring village Store Torøje.

7 farms outside the village limits remain active, while the village numbers 4 shut down farms and about 30 old houses with approximately 50-100 residents of all ages. Bus connections are scarce. Nearest shopping is available in the city Karise (4 km). Spjellerup-Smerup Central School is found 2 km south of the village.

From a distance you see the white church tower; the rest of the village is covered between plantations. An annual civic festival is held which is very popular. The village is a genuine Stevns-village, since it is placed on the eastern side of Stevns Å and Tryggevælde Å. Administratively though, Smerup belongs to Faxe municipality.

== History ==
Smerup is an old village from the years 1000-1100. This is witnessed in the local archive in the year 1310, where the village is named Smith-Thorp. Originally Smerup was a farming village, and all 11 farms were copyhold farms under the manor Vemmetofte. In addition to the 11 farms in the old village and their families, there were a small number of houses inhabited by landless lodgers and workmen (blacksmith, carpenter, weaver etc.).

The farming village is described in detail from around year 1700 with information about residents, land area, buildings and livestock etc. In the summer 1746, 6 farms and 2 houses were caught in a fire, but the farms were rebuilt within a few years. The oldest map of Smerup is from 1790, whereas parish registers can be found from 1726. Moreover, census papers from 1787 have been preserved, which document a population of 126 persons in Smerup at that time.

As a result of the big land reforms in the late 18th century, the farms of Smerup were moved out into the open country in 1830. The ancient village community had come to an end, and the farms were placed near their respective lands. At the same time, ownership of the land was changed in a way where freehold replaced copyhold. Farms were originally named after each copyholder, but were also numbered 1-11 by the administration in Vemmetofte. After freehold was introduced, each freeholder could name his own farm. These names, including 'Tungepil', 'Åbjerg', 'Dyrlund' etc., are still used today.

In the 20th century only two houses were built in Smerup and since then only 1 new house was built in 2006. All other houses are from the 18th and 19th centuries. When the co-op was shut down in 1971 the village became quieter. But in recent years a generational change has taken place which has brought young families with children to the village.

== Gallery ==
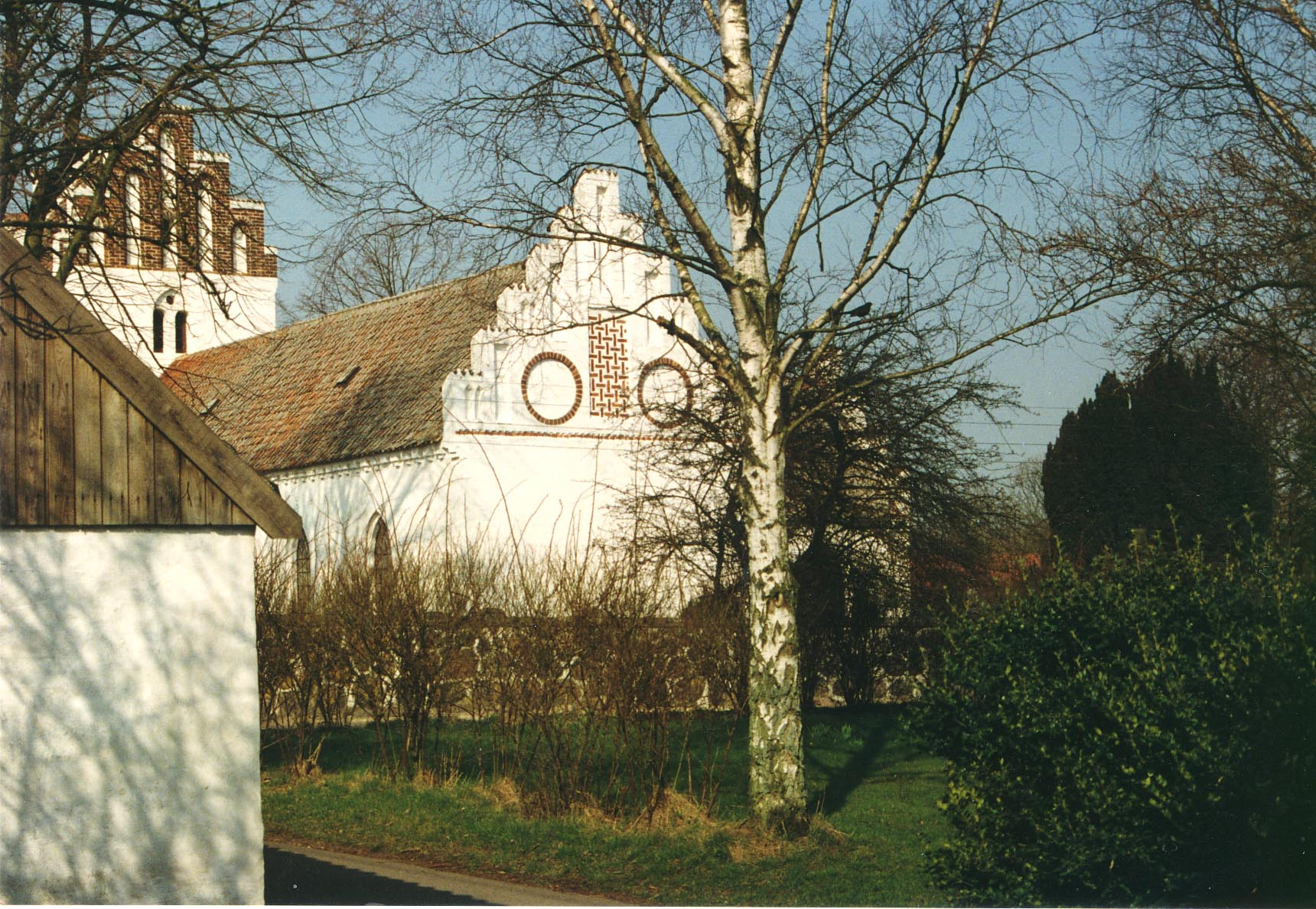
Smerup church ~1995

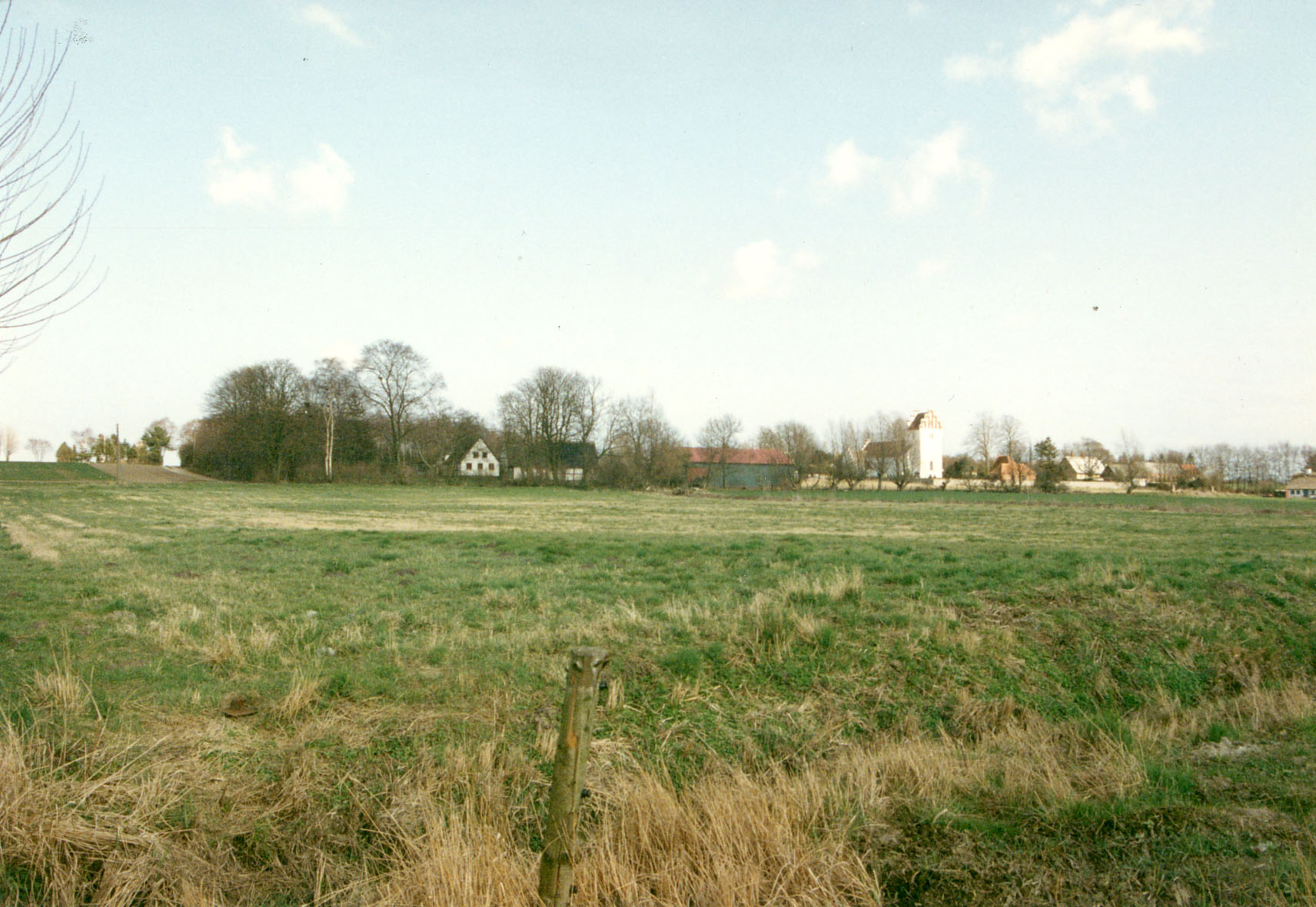
Smerup seen from Stevns Å 500 m west of the town ~1995

Parish register preserved from 1726.

Census papers from 1787. Page 1 of 4

Census papers from 1787. Page 2 of 4

Census papers from 1787. Page 3 of 4

Census papers from 1787. Page 4 of 4

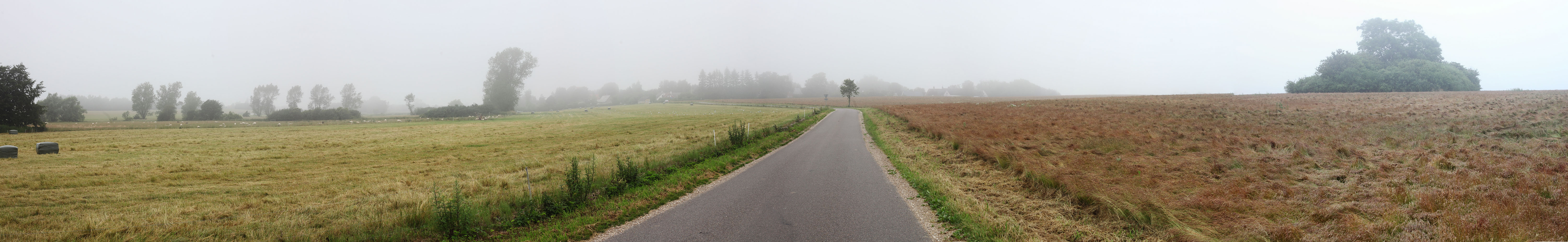
2012 panoramic view from the south
