= Tryggevælde =

Manor house and estate in Faxe Municipality, Denmark

- Interactive map of the Tryggevælde area

General information
- Location: Køgevej 67; 4653 Karise, Denmark
- Coordinates: 55°20′5.64″N 12°13′53.4″E
- Completed: 1849

Tryggevælde is a manor house and estate in Faxe Municipality, some fifty kilometres southwest of Copenhagen, Denmark. The estate was a royal fief until the middle of the 18th century and was later owned by the Moltke family at Bregentved from 1751 to 1937. The current main building is from 1849. The Tryggevælde Runestone was from some time during the 16th century to 1810 located in the central courtyard of the old main building.

== History ==
=== Crown land, 1355–1670 ===
The name Tryggevælde is first mentioned in 1261. The next time it is mentioned is in 1355 when the brothers Bent, Jon and Esbern Grubbe ceded it to Valdemar IV. They had most likely inherited it from their father, Bo Jensen Grubbe, who had been killed on his way home from the Holy Land in 1349. The brothers had also inherited Alslevgaard which would remain in the hands of the family for more than 300 years.

Tryggevælde was then managed as a royal fief until 1670. Chancellor Evert Grubbe was lensmann of Tryggevælde from 1470 to 1489. He was succeeded by Christian Nielsen Dyre (1503-1505) and Gunde Hansen Lange, but then it returned to the Grubbe family.

In 1568, Tryggevælde was incorporated in the Fief of Copenhagen (Københavns Len). In 1672 it was again disjoined from the Fief of Copenhagen and expanded with several estates and former church land. The new lensmann of Tryggevælde was Eiler Grubbe, Chancellor of the Realm. He was after his death in 1585 succeeded by Arild Huitfeldt. He relocated to Vordingborg Castle in 1596 and later to Dragsholm.

=== Changing owners ===
In 1670, Tryggevælde was sold to Otte Skeel. His son, Christen Skeel, bought the smaller manor of Alslevgaard and converted it into a tenant farm under Tryggevælde.

In 1710, Tryggevælde was acquired by Peder Benzon. He ceded it to the crown two years later in exchange for Vibygård and it was then included in one of the 12 cavalry districts. In 1747, Tryggevælde was sold to Peter Johansen Neergaard,

=== The Moltke family ===
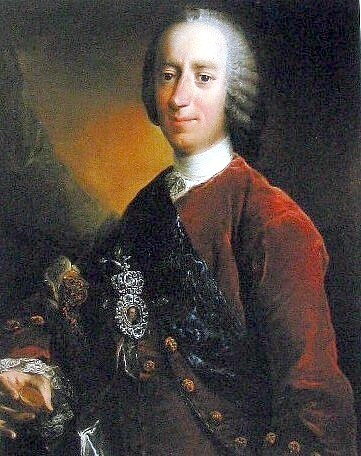
LAdam Gottlob Moltke

In 1751, Tryggevælde was acquired by Adam Gottlob Moltke. He had the previous year established the Countship of Bregentved but Tryggevælde (with Alslevgaard) remained an unentailed estate.

The Countship of Bregentved was as a result of the lensafløsningsloven dissolved in 1922 and Count Moltke was in the same time required to pay a special tax to the government. 16 smallholdings was in this connection sold off in lots to raise the necessary money for the tax.

=== The Lemvigh family ===
Aage Lemvigh, the owner of A. C. Lemvigh-Müller, purchased the remains of the Tryggevælde estate from Moltke in 1937. He was in 1959 succeeded by his son Axel Jørn Lemvigh. He passed it on to his son Jørn Lemvigh.

== Architecture ==
The main building is from 1849. The facade features a gabled median risalit.

The Tryggevælde Runestone was for hundreds of years situated in the courtyard of the old main building. It was probably brought to the site from a local hilltop by one of the king's vassals some time during the 16th century. In 1810, it was moved to a site in the former graveyard next to Trinitatis Church in Copenhagen. It is now located in the National Museum.

== Today ==
The Tryggevælde estate has since 1996 been owned by Christian Ivar Schou Danneskiold Lassen.

== List of owners ==
- ( -1349) Bo Jensen Grubbe
- (1349-1355) Bent Grubbe
- (1349-1355) Jon Grubbe
- (1349-1355) Esbern Grubbe
- (1355-1670) The Crown
- (1670-1695) Otto Skeel
- (1695-1709) Christen Skeel
- (1709-1716) The heirs of Christen Skeel
- (1716-1718) Peder Benzon
- (1718-1747) The Crown
- (1747-1751) Peter Johansen Neergaard
- (1751-1792) Adam Gottlob Moltke
- (1792-1818) Joachim Godske Moltke
- (1818-1864) Adam Wilhelm Moltke
- (1864-1875) Frederik Georg Julius Moltke
- (1875-1936) Frederik Christian Moltke
- (1937-1959) Aage Lemvigh
- (1959-1980) Axel Jørn Lemvigh
- (1980-1996) Jørn Lemvigh
- (1996- ) Christian Ivar Schou Danneskiold
