= Faxe Municipality =

Faxe Municipality Faxe Kommune (Danish)
- Municipality
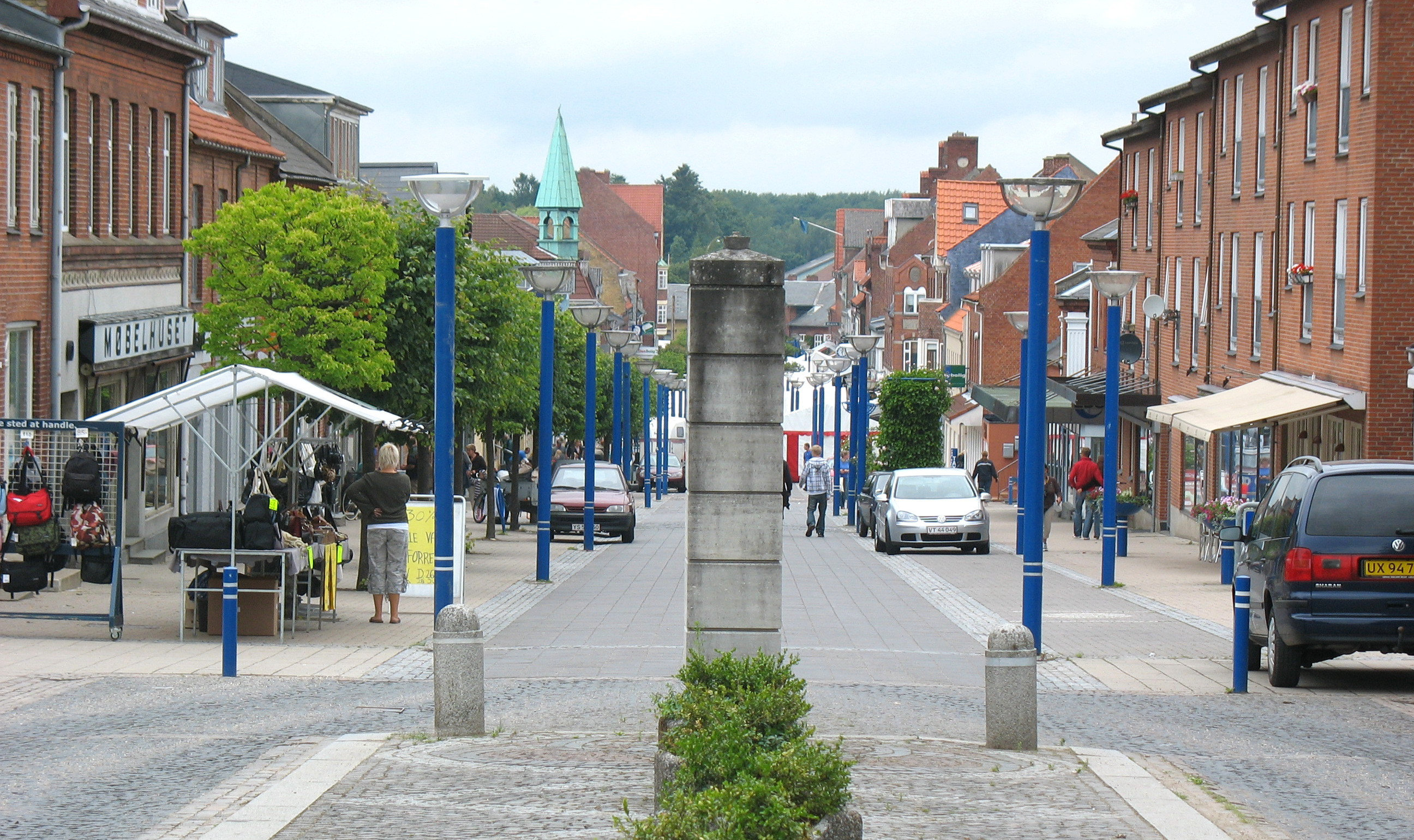
- Haslev

- Coat of arms

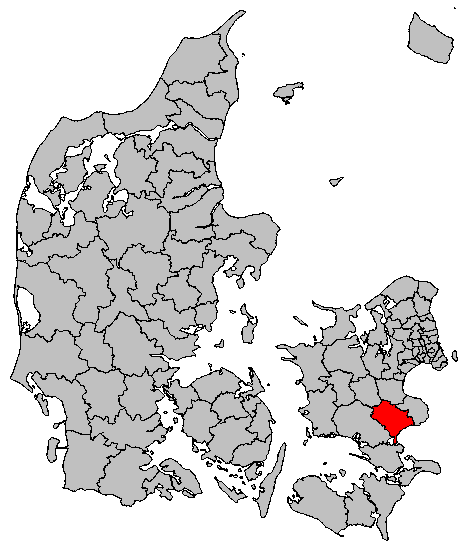
- Coordinates: 55°16′N 12°12′E
- Country: Denmark
- Region: Zealand
- Established: 1 January 2007
- Seat: Haslev

Government
  - Mayor: Ole Vive (V)

Area
  - Total: 404.54 km^{2} (156.19 sq mi)

Population (1 January 2026)
  - Total: 38,143
  - Density: 94.287/km^{2} (244.20/sq mi)
- Time zone: UTC+1 (CET)
  - Summer (DST): UTC+2 (CEST)
- Municipal code: 320
- Website: www.faxekommune.dk

Faxe Municipality (Danish: Faxe Kommune) is a kommune in Denmark in the Region Sjælland on the island of Zealand. The municipality covers an area of 406 km^{2} and has a population of 38,143 (2026). Its mayor as of January 2018 is Ole Vive. He is a member of the agrarian liberal Venstre political party.

On 1 January 2007 Faxe municipality, as the result of Kommunalreformen ("The Municipal Reform" of 2007), came into existence by merging the three former municipalities of Haslev, Fakse, and Rønnede.

== Geography ==
On 5 June 2007, it was reported by national broadcaster Danmarks Radio that an unknown hill near Rønnede (town), named Kobanke, has the highest natural point of terrain, 122.9 meters (403 feet) on Sjælland. Gyldenløveshøj has an altitude of 126 meters (413 feet), but that is due to a manmade hill from the 17th century. Its natural height is 121.3 meters (398 feet).

=== Locations ===
The ten largest locations in the municipality are as of 2022:

Haslev	12,119
Faxe	4,246
Faxe Ladeplads	2,884
Rønnede	2,746
Karise	2,392
Dalby	2,253
Terslev	937
Førslev	346
Store Spjellerup	223
Teestrup	237

=== Population by postal district ===
- 4690 Haslev 17.698 citizens.
- 4640 Faxe 6.600 citizens.
- 4683 Rønnede 3.346 citizens.
- 4653 Karise 3.299 citizens.
- 4654 Faxe Ladeplads 3.000 citizens.

== Landmarks ==
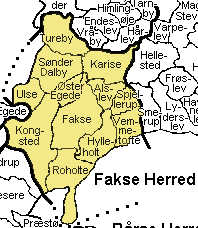
Fakse Herred

Several historic churches are located in Faxe Municipality including: Vester Egede Church, Braaby Church (Bråby Church), Faxe Church, Freerslev Church, Haslev Church and Roholte Church, (Kongsted Church), (Hylleholt Church), (Dalby Church) Sønder Dalby, Dalby-Tureby, (Karise Church) and (Ulse Church), (Tureby Church), (Alslev Church), (Smerup Church), Vemmetofte Church, Vemmetofte Monastery, Vemmetofte Monastery Church, Vemmetofte Castle, (Øster Egede Church), (Tureby Church), (Spjellerup Church), (Øde Førslev Church), (Terslev Church) and (Teestrup Church) and (Ingelstrup Chapel). All the churches in the municipality and The manor houses of Gisselfeld, Gisselfeld Monastery and Bregentved Estate, Tryggevælde, Strandegård, Lindersvold, Rosendal, Turebyholm, Sofiedal, Rødehus, Holtegård, Alslevgaard and Lystrup also belong to the municipality. The manor houses of Bregentved and Jomfruens Egede are also situated in the municipality.

== Economy ==
The municipality is home to the head offices of companies such as Royal Unibrew, Faxe Brewery and Danish Agro. Faxe Quarry is owned by the Belgian Lhoist Group.

== Politics ==
Faxe's municipal council consists of 25 members, elected every four years. The municipal council has seven political committees.

=== Municipal council ===
Below are the municipal councils elected since the Municipal Reform of 2007.

Election	Party								Total seats	Turnout	Elected mayor
Election	A	C	F	I	L	O	V	Ø	Total seats	Turnout	Elected mayor
2005	9	1	1		5	2	9		27	70.7%	René Tuekær (L)
2009	8	1	3		4	2	9		27	67.6%	Knud Erik Hansen (A)
2013	6	2	1		4	3	7	2	25	72.5%	Knud Erik Hansen (A)
2017	8	1	1	1	2	4	7	1	25	70.2%	Ole Vive (V)
Data from Kmdvalg.dk 2005, 2009, 2013 and 2017

== Image gallery ==
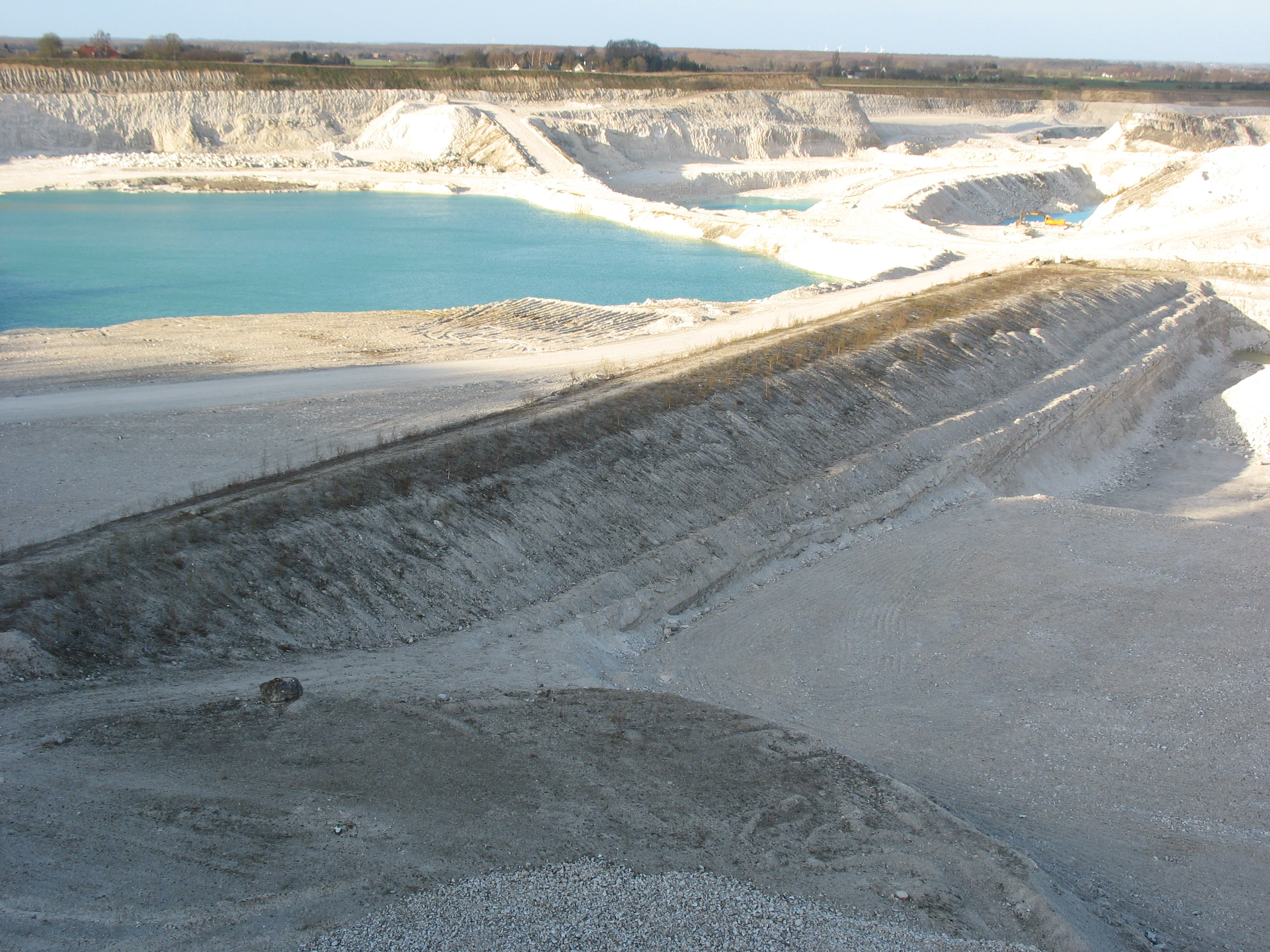
Faxe Limestone Quarry

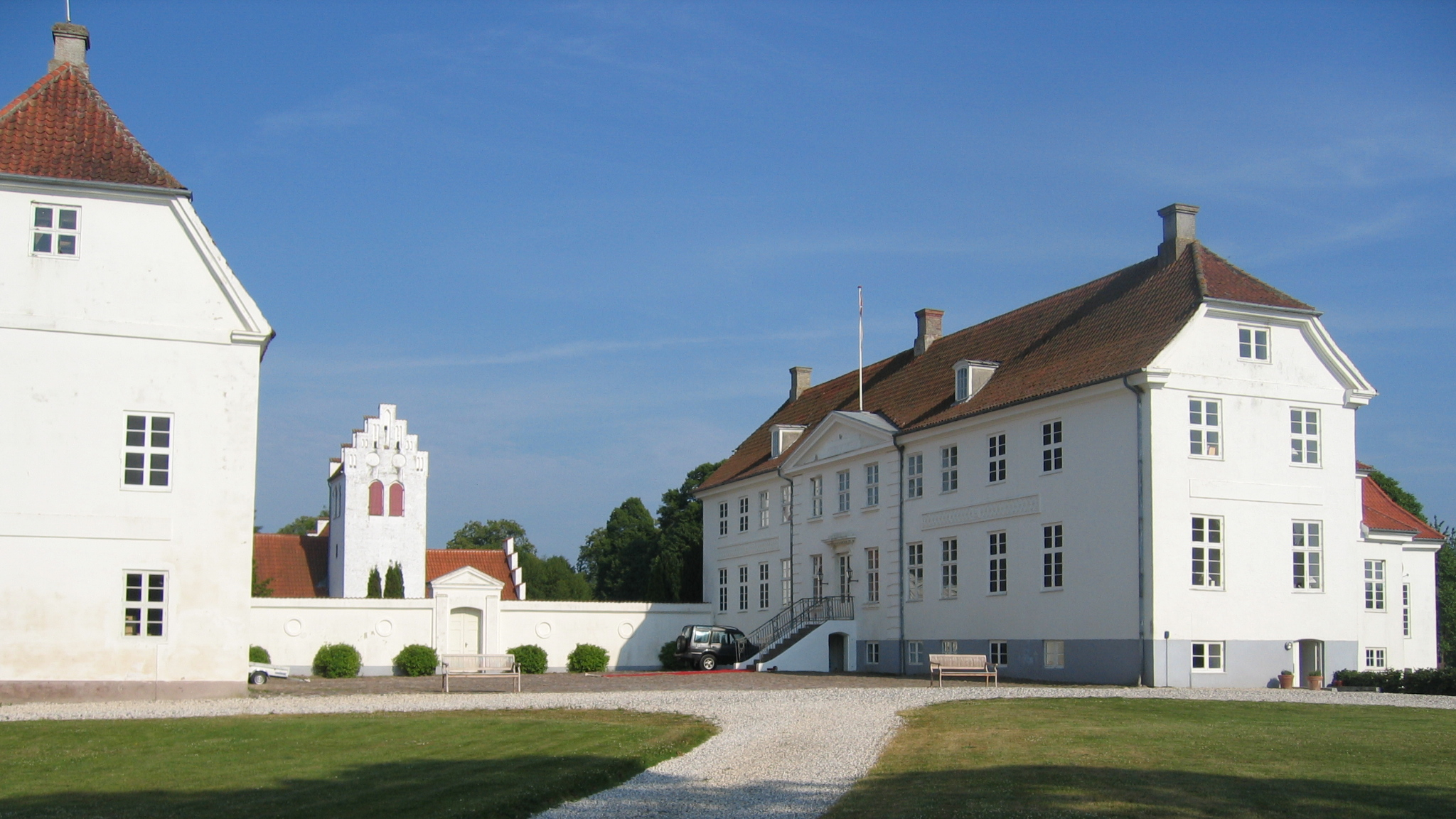
Jomfruens Egede

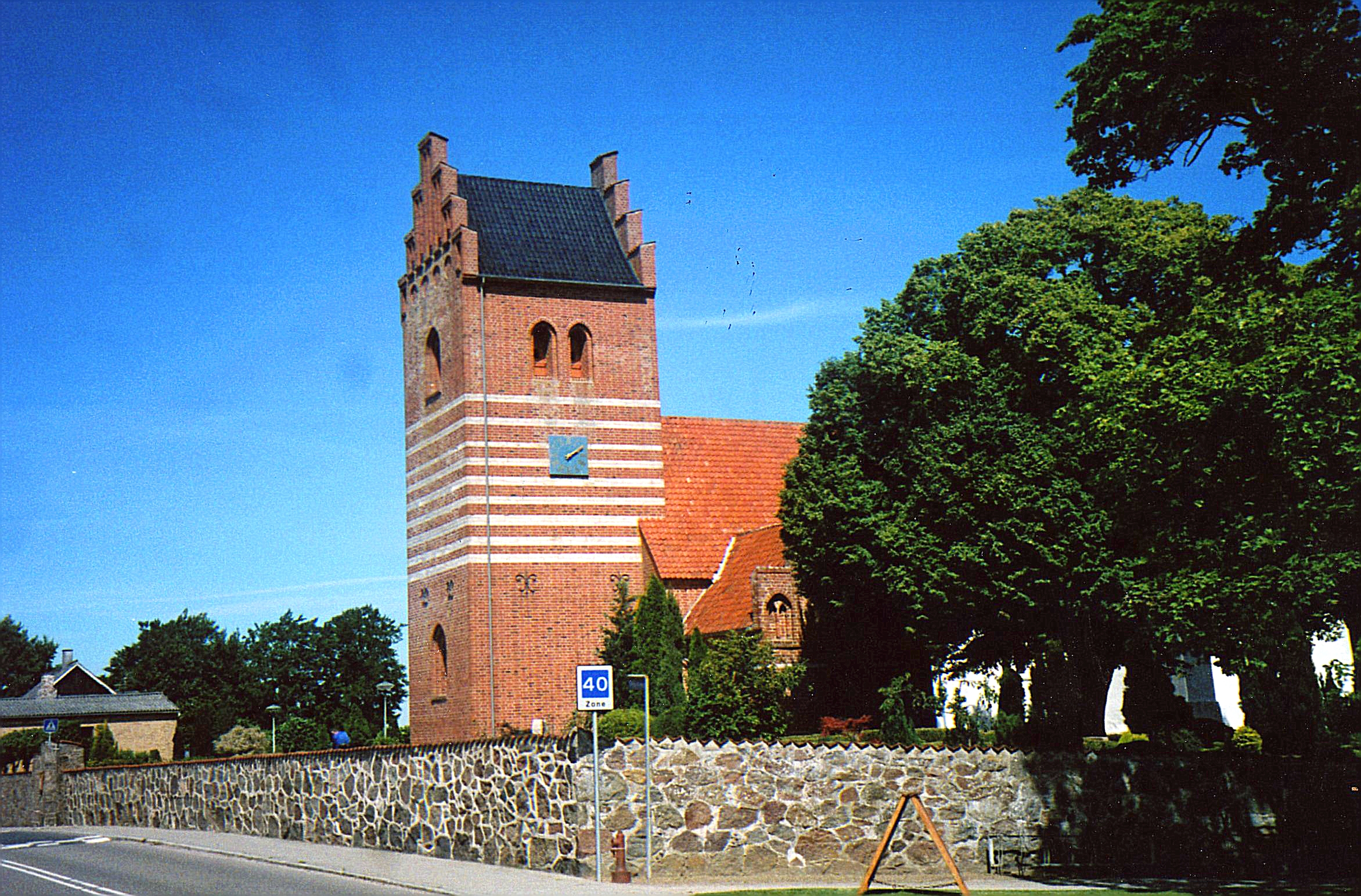
Kongsted Church

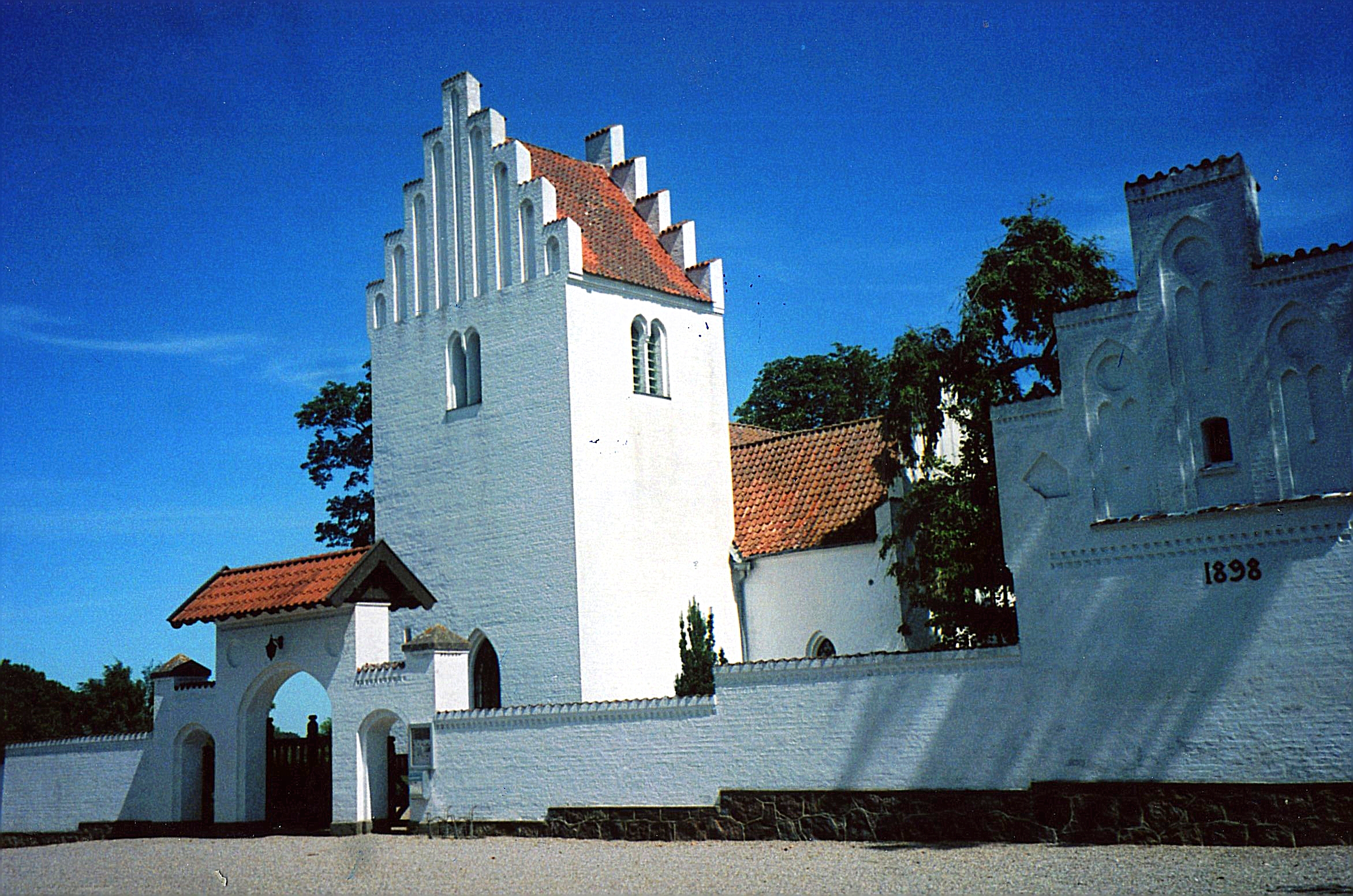
Bråby Church (Braaby Church)
