= Roholte Church =

Coordinates: 55°11′44″N 12°5′26″E

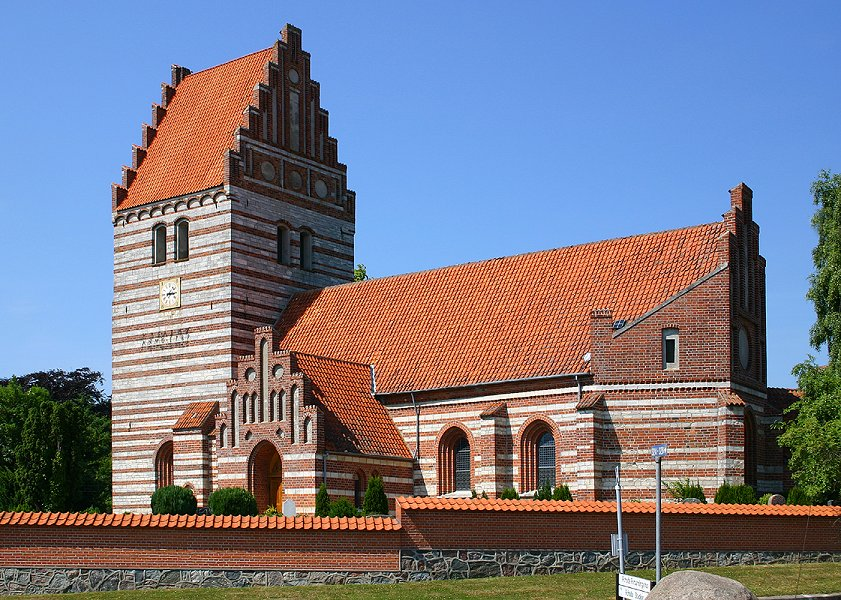
- Roholte Church from the southeast

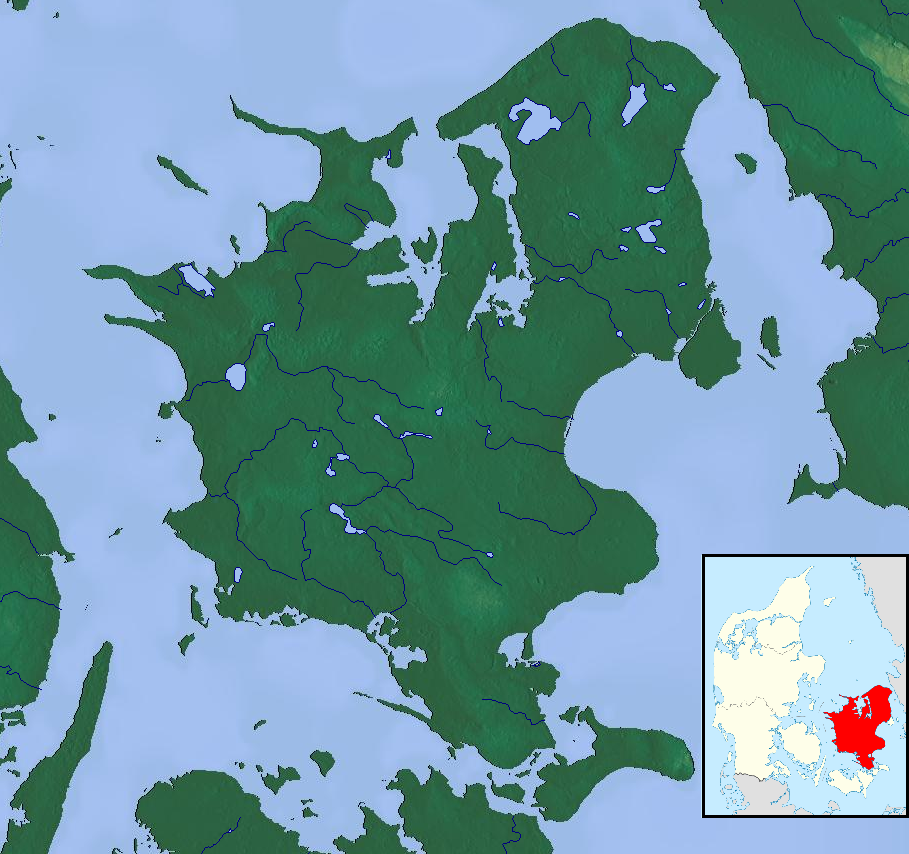
- Location in Zealand
- Location: Roholte, near Præstø, Zealand
- Country: Denmark
- Denomination: Church of Denmark
- Previous denomination: Catholic
- Website: https://sogn.dk/roholte/

History
- Status: Parish church
- Dedication: Saint Anne
- Consecrated: 1441

Architecture
- Functional status: Active
- Architectural type: Church
- Style: Gothic
- Groundbreaking: 15th century
- Completed: 1884

Specifications
- Materials: Brick and chalk

Administration
- Diocese: Roskilde
- Deanery: Tryggevælde, Præstø
- Parish: Roholte

Roholte Church (Danish: Roholte Kirke) is a church located in the village of Roholte, between Faxe and Præstø in Roholte Parish, Faxe Municipality, Region Zealand, Denmark. From 1441 to 1677, the church belonged to the king. In 1737, it became the property of Otto Thott. It remained in the Thott family until 1953.

The original architecture is in the Late Gothic style, with additions in 1500 and renovations in 1884. The interior is a mix of Gothic and High Renaissance styles. The crucifix once had an inscription, now lost, that was among the oldest of its kind.

== History ==
On a beam below the church's crucifix, there is an inscription: "Templum hoc fundatum est tempore Christophori regis Daniæ Anno 1441" (This church was founded in King Christopher of Denmark's time in the year 1441). Another reference to the church's origin can be found in a letter from Oluf Mortensen, Bishop of Roskilde, in 1467, which refers to the parish church of "Roolthe" which some years ago was built anew ("de novo erecta fuerit et constructa ... nonnullis annis elapsis") and dedicated to Saint Anne. In a deed of gift from Christian V dated 19 December 1677, Mette Sophie Urne until Lindersvold was granted ownership of the church in accordance with jus patronatus. Otto Thott (1703–1785) purchased Gavnø in 1737. As a result, the church remained in the hands of the Thott family for some 200 years. Major restoration work was carried out in 1883–1884 under Kjeld Thor Tage Otto Reedtz-Thott.

== Architecture ==
Situated on undulating ground with a view to the south, the original Late Gothic building from 1441 consisted of a nave, narrowing somewhat towards the west, and a chancel with a three-sided east wall. Red brick interspersed with blocks of chalk was used to achieve a decorative belted effect on the walls. The tower, which is slightly more recent than the nave, was probably built around 1500. It has stepped gables with narrow blank windows and is decorated with belts of brick and chalk. The western windows have rounded arches. The sacristy, now used as a funeral chapel, was added around 1500 and has a tall stepped gable with five stages. The east wall of the chancel was completely rebuilt during restoration work completed in 1884. The walls of the nave were also heightened at that time, and the porch was reconstructed.

=== Interior ===
The church has a vaulted ceiling with star-shaped segments. The altarpiece from 1592 is in the High Renaissance style as is the pulpit, dated to 1599. The Late Gothic crucifix, originally on the chancel arch and now on the north wall, was added around 1460. The figure of Christ, about 130 cm high, has a crown of small thorns. The head is turned sharply to the right and the eyes are closed. A priest's account in 1755 documents the existence of a former inscription, based upon Lamentations 1:12, which read: "O vos, qui transitis per viam, attendite et videte si est dolor similis sicut dolor meus. Completus est opus istud An: 1555" (Oh, you who pass this way, look carefully and see if there is any sorrow like my sorrow. This work was completed in the year 1555). Roholte Church is one of four churches known to have contained a crucifix inscribed with a version of this passage from Lamentations; Roholte's is considered to be the oldest of the four. The Gothic font, dated to around 1450, is of Gotland limestone and is decorated with shallow reliefs of angels and the apostles. The baptismal bowl, dated to around 1550, is from the south of Germany. It is decorated with a deer surrounded by lilies.

== Parish ==
Rohalte Parish is in the Faxe Municipality which has a population of 810, of whom 675 belong to the Church of Denmark.

The recipient of the 1917 Nobel Prize in Literature (awarded for his poetry), Karl Adolph Gjellerup (1857–1919), was born in the Roholte vicarage.

== Churchyard ==
Notable burials in the churchyard include:

- Mime Føns (1911–1994), actress
- Curt von Lüttichau (1887–1991)), architect and painter
- Poul Petersen, actor and theatre director
