= Faxe Church =

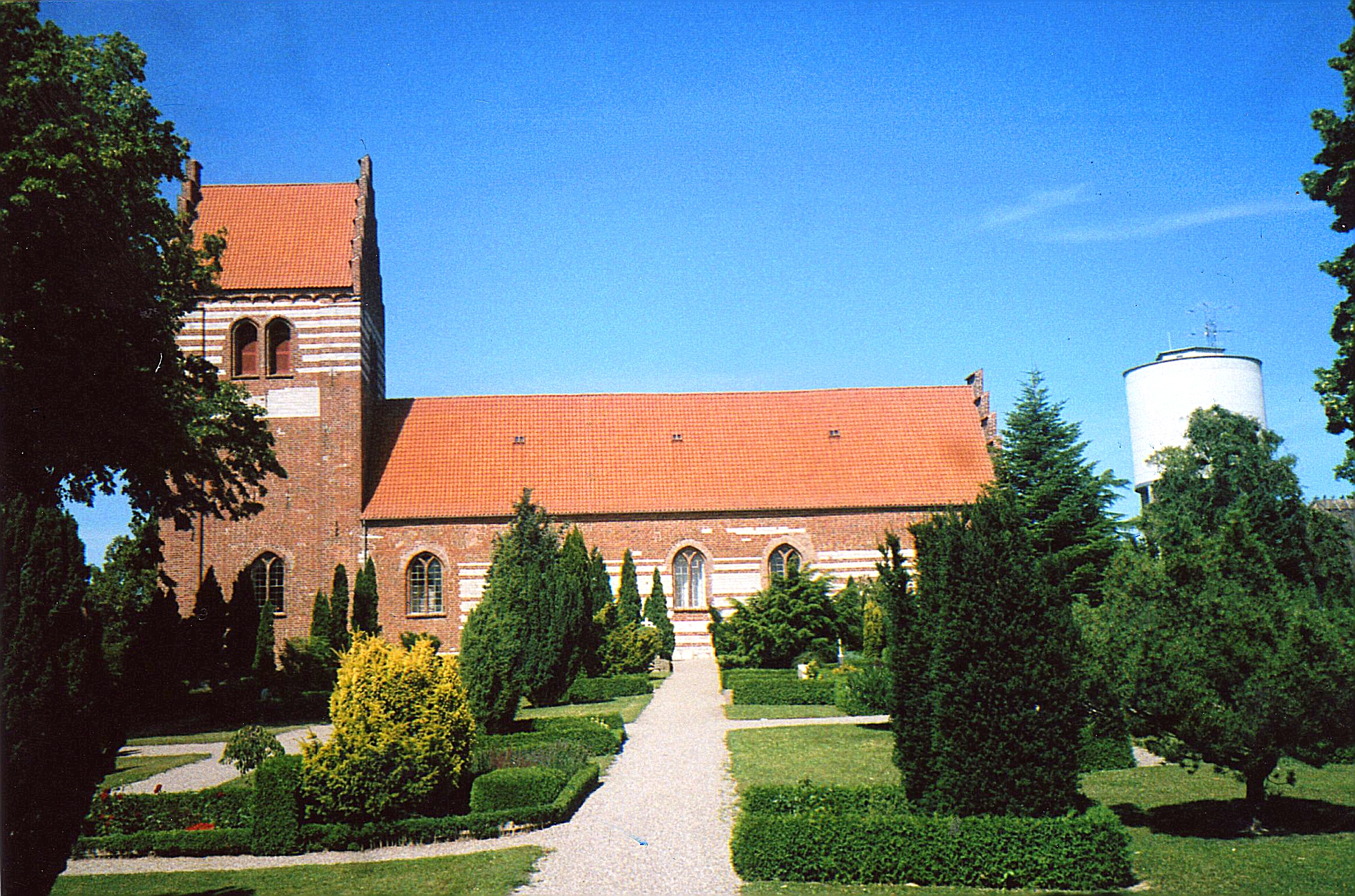
- Faxe Church

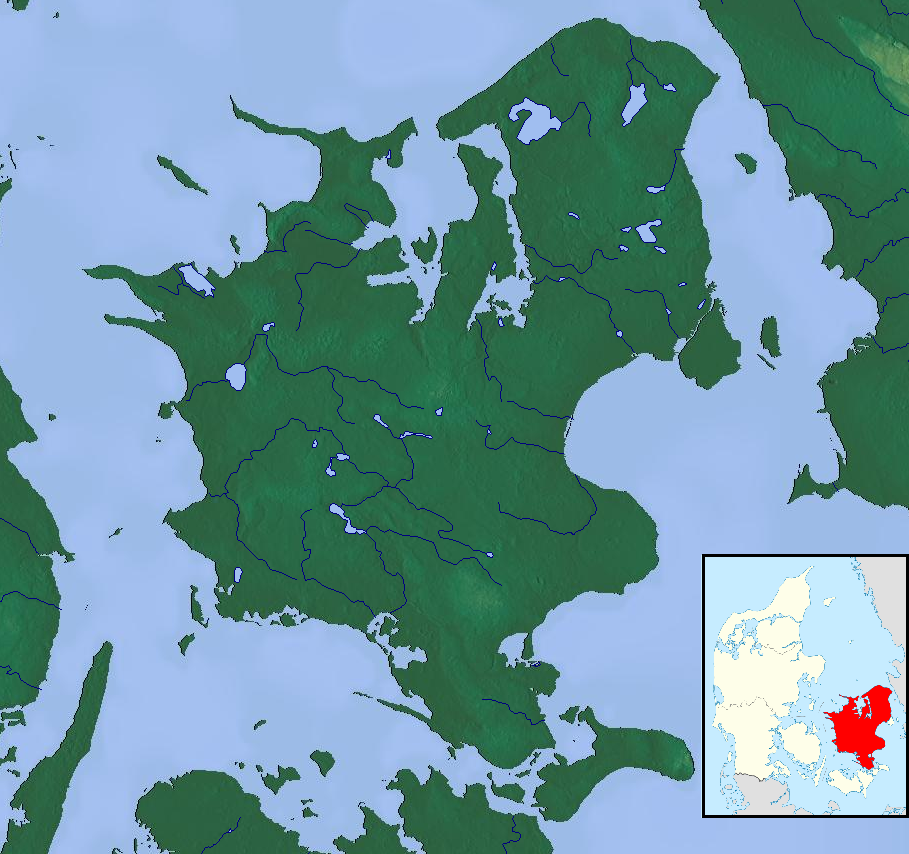
- Faxe Church in Zealand
- 55°15′20″N 12°07′12″E
- Denomination: Church of Denmark
- Previous denomination: Catholic

History
- Dedication: Evangelical Lutheran

Faxe Church (Danish: Faxe Kirke) is a Danish church located in the Diocese of Roskilde, in Faxe, Region Sjælland on the island of Zealand. It was built at the end of the 15th century on a site where there had originally been a Romanesque church. A number of frescos, probably painted by artists from the Brarup workshop, have been uncovered on the cross vaults, most recently above the organ.

== History ==
The red-brick church was probably built in or shortly after 1492 when King Hans transferred the site into the ownership of Copenhagen University. The masonry, however, contains traces of an earlier Romanesque limestone structure, probably dating from Valdemar Atterdag's reign.

== Architecture ==
Today's late Gothic building, 40 m (130 ft) in length, has a brick nave with limestone trimmings. On the south wall, the pointed arch of a now bricked-up door can be seen, probably once the priest's entrance. The tower was built at the same time as the nave or shortly afterwards. Its east gable has nine narrow blank windows of varying heights and three Gothic windows which have been bricked in. Decorations in the form of limestone belts reach the level of the roof on the eastern side but have been less systematically completed elsewhere, perhaps indicating rushed construction work. In the 17th century, the northern aisle was added in order to accommodate the growing number of parishioners.

== Interior ==
The nave is covered with five cross vaults supported by wall pillars. The tower room has a cross-vaulted area which probably served as a baptistry until it became a porch for the west entrance in 1638. The altarpiece consists of a 1717 painting by Hendrick Krock, Frederik IV's court painter. The pulpit is probably from Abel Schrøder's workshop (1614–1615). The altar is flanked by the figures of Mary and John, which together with the chancel arch cross in the north aisle, probably hung between the chancel and the nave. The northern aisle contains two sculpted limestone which probably stem from the earlier church. The lions and snakes which decorate them could well have been sculpted by an artist from Jutland as they are not typical of the region. The Romanesque granite font decorated with four palms comes from Bondo Friso's workshop (1200–1250).

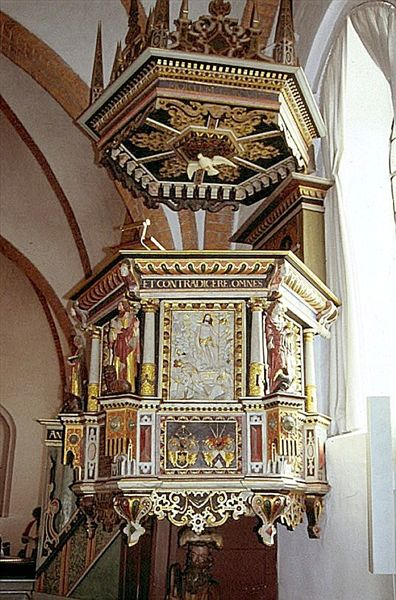
Pulpit (1615)

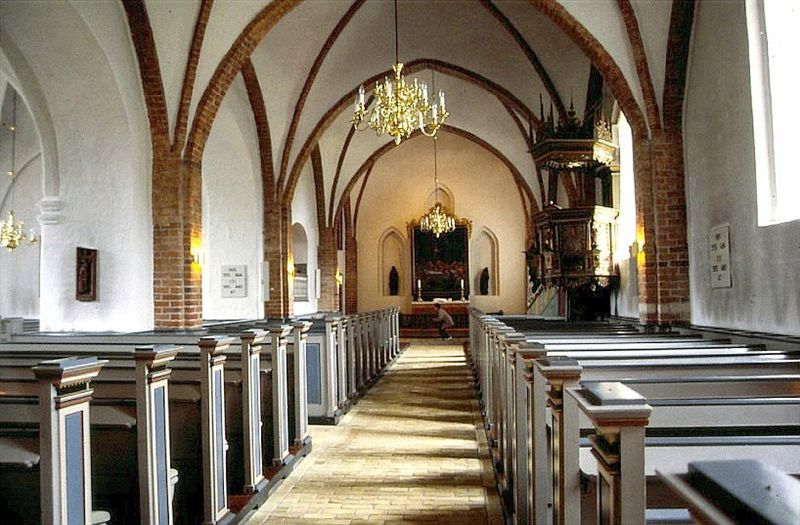
Interior

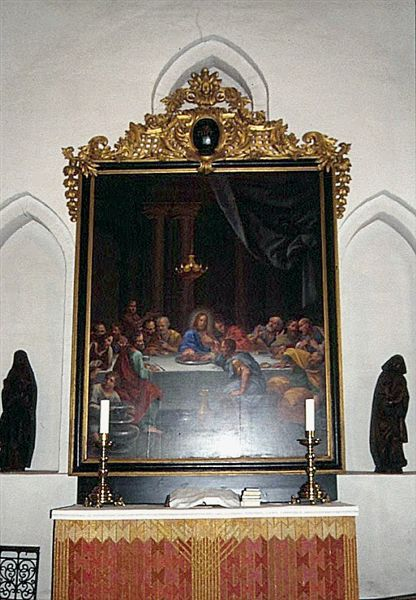
Altarpiece (1717)

== Frescos ==
The frescos in the tower room were discovered by Magnus Petersen in 1862 and restored by Jacob Kornerup in 1877 and H. Borre in 1950. The vault displays scenes from the legend of John the Baptist. His capture can be seen in the north segment while the east segment shows Herod at a table with Herodias and Salome, a servant bearing John's head and placing it before Salome. The south segment depicts John's decapitation with Herod arranging his execution on the eastern side. On the north wall of the tower room there is a fresco of George and the Dragon, on the far western side the king and queen are shown on the town wall, the princess being shown at the top. The eastern image displays the martyrdom of Simon the Apostle. In 2007, frescos from the beginning of the 16th century were also discovered in the vault above the organ and are now being restored. Painted by the Brarup workshop, they show the Descent from the Cross, the Pietà, the Entombment and the Ascension. Investigations have also revealed that the whole church was decorated by the Brarup workshop.

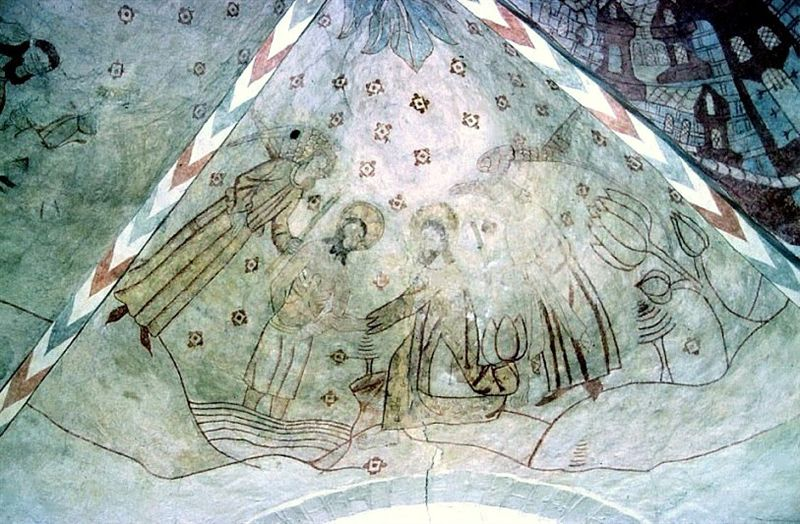
John baptising Jesus

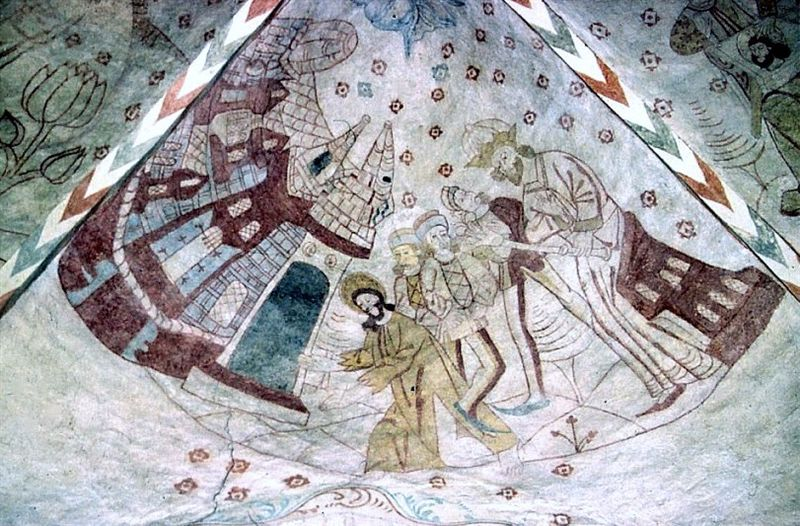
John the Baptist's capture

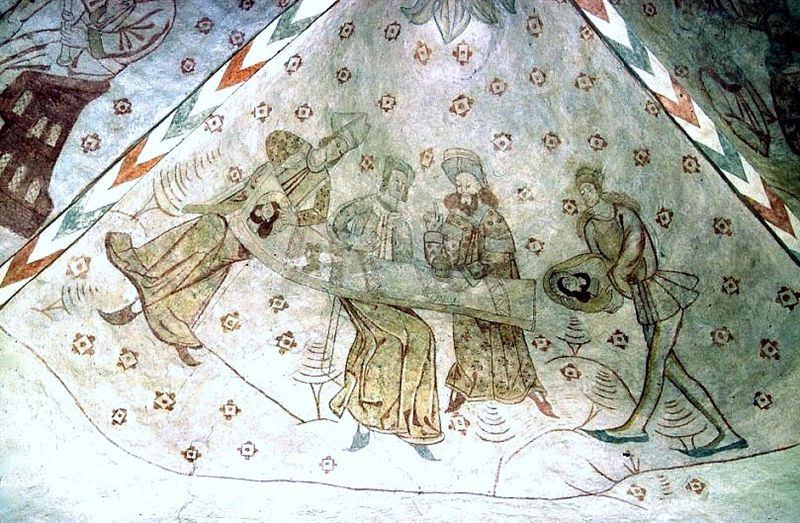
Serving John the Baptist's head

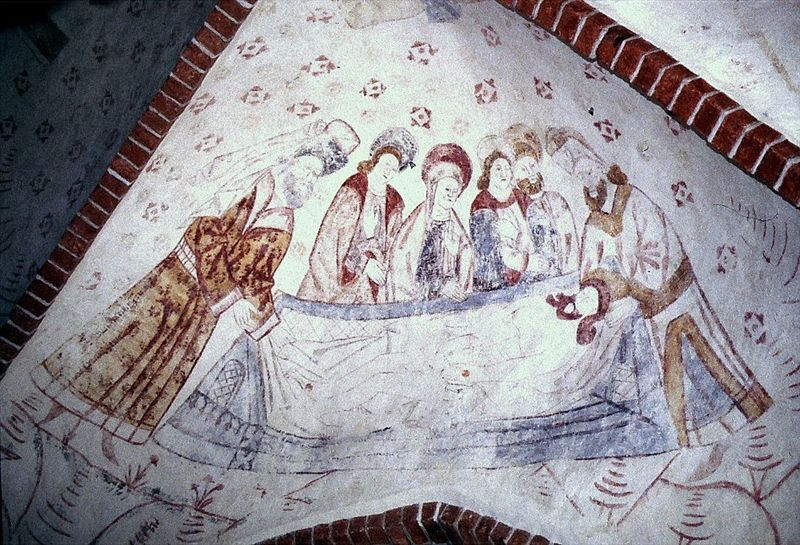
Fresco above the organ

== Churchyard ==
Notable burials in the surrounding churchyard include:

- Malthe Engelsted (1852-1930), painter
- Kjeld Gustav Knuth-Winterfeldt (1908-1992), duokimat and lord chamberlain
- Conrad Nielsen (1866-1914), businessman
- Nicoline Nielsen (1874-1951), businesswoman

== See also ==
- List of churches in Region Zealand
